= Term of endearment =

Phrase expressing affection

A term of endearment is a word or phrase used to address or describe a person, animal or inanimate object for which the speaker feels love or affection. Terms of endearment are used for a variety of reasons, such as parents addressing their children and lovers addressing each other.

== Usage ==
Each term of endearment has its own connotations, which are highly dependent on the situation they are used in, such as tone of voice, body language, and social context. Certain terms can be perceived as offensive or patronizing, depending on the context and speaker.

Feminists have argued that while "terms of endearment are words used by close friends, families, and lovers...they are also used on women by perfect strangers...double standard" – because "between strangers terms of endearment imply a judgment of incompetence on the part of the target". Others have pointed out however that, in an informal setting like a pub, "the use of terms of endearment here was a positive politeness strategy. A term like 'mate', or 'sweetie', shifts the focus of the request away from its imposition...toward the camaraderie existing between interlocutors".

Terms of endearment often '"make use of internal rhyme...[with] still current forms such as lovey-dovey, which appeared in 1819, and honey bunny", or of other duplications.

Terms of endearment can lose their original meaning over the course of time: thus for example "in the early twentieth century the word crumpet was used as a term of endearment by both sexes'", before diminishing later into a "term of objectification" for women.

When proper names escape one, terms of endearment can always substitute. This is described by the psychoanalyst Jacques Lacan: The "opacity of the ejaculations of love, when, lacking a signifier to name the object of its epithalamium, it employs the crudest trickery of the imaginary. 'I'll eat you up....Sweetie!' 'You'll love it...Rat!'".

Psychiatrist Eric Berne identified the marital game of "Sweetheart", where "White makes a subtly derogatory remark about Mrs White, disguised as anecdote, and ends: 'Isn't that right, sweetheart?' Mrs. White tends to agree...because it would seem surly to disagree with a man who calls one 'sweetheart' in public". Berne points out that "the more tense the situation, and the closer the game is to exposure, the more bitterly is the word 'sweetheart' enunciated"; while the wife's antithesis is either '"to reply: 'Yes, honey!'" or to "respond with a similar 'Sweetheart' type anecdote about the husband, saying in effect, 'You have a dirty face too, dear'".

== See also ==
- Diminutive
- Hypocorism
- Nickname
