= Victim mentality =

Mindset that one has been hurt by the actions of others

Victim mentality, victim complex or victimese is a psychological concept referring to a mindset in which a person, or group of people, tends to recognize or consider themselves a victim of the actions of others. The term is also used in reference to the tendency for blaming one's misfortunes on somebody else's misdeeds, which is also referred to as victimism. It can develop as a defense mechanism to cope with negative life events.

Victim mentality can be developed from abuse and situations during childhood through adulthood. Similarly, criminals often engage in victim thinking, believing themselves to be moral and engaging in crime only as a reaction to an immoral world and furthermore feeling that authorities are unfairly singling them out for persecution. This mentality could also be branched from patterns of trauma which could make oneself feel like a victim.

Characteristics of the victimhood mindset have been observed at the group level, although not all individual-level traits apply.

== Features ==
Victim complex tends to be described as a person's personality trait who embodies their belief in being in constant victimhood and pain from the actions of other people. Although self-pity every now and then is something "normal," as that is one of the key stages of grief, it should be temporary and small compared to the exaggerated feelings of guilt, shame, helplessness, etc. More often than not, people who are complex victims get very easily consumed by depression.

- Identifying others as the cause for an undesired situation and denying one's personal responsibility for one's life or circumstances.
- Attributing negative intentions to the offender.
- Believing that other people are generally more fortunate.
- Gaining relief from feeling pity for oneself or receiving sympathy from others.

It has been typically characterized by attitudes of pessimism, self-pity, and repressed anger.

People with a victim mentality may also:

- exhibit a general tendency to perceive a situation realistically but lack an awareness or curiosity about the root of actual powerlessness in a situation
- display entitlement and selfishness
- become defensive, even when others try to help
- avoid taking risks
- exhibit learned helplessness
- be self-abasing
- feel the importance of being seen as a victim by others
- have the tendency to put others at fault for the outcome of a situation

At the individual and collective level, other features of a victim mentality include:

- Need for recognition – the desire for individuals to have their victimhood recognized and affirmed by others. This recognition helps reaffirm positive basic assumptions the individual holds about themselves, others, and the world in general. This also implies that offenders recognize their wrongdoing. At a collective level, this can encourage people to have a positive well-being with regard to traumatic events and to encourage conciliatory attitudes in group conflicts.
- Moral elitism – the perception of the moral superiority of the self and the immorality of the other side, at both individual and group levels. At an individual level, this tends to involve a "black and white" view of morality and the actions of individuals. The individual denies their own aggressiveness and sees the self as weak and persecuted by the morally impure, while the other person is seen as threatening, persecuting, and immoral, preserving the image of a morally pure self. At a collective level, moral elitism means that groups emphasize the harm inflicted on them, while also seeing themselves as morally superior. This also means that individuals see their own violence as justified and moral, while the outgroup's violence is unjustified and morally wrong.
- Lack of empathy – because individuals are concerned with their own suffering, they tend to be unwilling to divert interest to the suffering of others. They will either ignore the suffering of others or act more selfishly. At the collective level, groups preoccupied with their own victimhood are unwilling to see the outgroup's perspective and show less empathy to their adversaries, while being less likely to accept responsibility for the harm they commit. This results in the group being collectively egoistic.
- Rumination – victims tend to focus attention on their distress and its causes and consequences rather than solutions. This causes aggression in response to insults or threats and decreases the desire for forgiveness by including a desire for revenge against the perpetrator. Similar dynamics play out at the collective level.

== Victims of abuse and manipulation ==
Victims of abuse and psychological manipulation are often trapped in a self-image of victimization. The psychological profile of victimization includes a variety of feelings and emotions, such as pervasive sense of helplessness, passivity, loss of control, pessimism, negative thinking, strong feelings of guilt, shame, self-blame, and depression. This way of thinking can lead one to hopelessness and despair. The victim role can be reinforced by individuals viewing themselves as having had the same agency at the time they were victimized as they have in the present.

It is common for a psychotherapist to take a long period of time to build a trusting relationship with a victim. Oftentimes, victims will develop a distrust of authority figures, along with the expectation of being hurt or exploited.

Sexual abuse and victim mentality appear to have strong connections. Regardless of gender, all age groups forced to participate in and perform non-consensual sexual acts are more likely to develop feelings of self-recrimination, guilt, and self-blame for acts that they were forced to perform. Sexual abuse may also manifest in other ways such as petting, lewd verbal suggestions and communication, and exposure of one's body for sexual pleasure.

According to Koçtürk, Nilüfer et al. the timing of disclosure among victims of abuse may vary, especially when it comes to sexual abuse. If the event occurred during their childhood or teenage years, they may not tell anyone until adulthood. The reasons for doing so are numerous, such as not wanting to draw attention to the event, not wanting the event to become a public spectacle, fear that their peers, friends, and others would think negatively of them, and not wanting to cause problems within the household. It has been found that victims who disclose to their family members early on usually have higher levels of support from family members and their community. Encouragement to disclose their traumatic experience sooner, rather than later, is greatly needed.

Studies conducted by Andronnikova and Kudinov sought to determine a correlation between the degree of abuse and victimhood, and the victim's likelihood to exhibit behaviors consistent with a victim mentality. Studies were successful in identifying a strong correlation between those with a victim mentality and negative behaviors such as catastrophizing, self-demandingness, demandingness to others, and low frustration tolerance.

=== Breaking out ===
In 2005, a study led by psychologist Charles R. Snyder indicated that if a victim mentality sufferer forgives themselves or the situation leading to that mental state, symptoms of PTSD or hostility can be mediated.

For adolescent victims, support groups and psychodrama techniques can help people gain a realistic view of past traumas, seeing that they were helpless but are no longer so. These techniques emphasize victims' feelings and expressing those feelings. Support groups are useful in allowing others to practice assertiveness techniques, and warmly supporting others in the process.

Successful techniques have included therapeutic teaching methods regarding concepts of normative decision theory, emotional intelligence, cognitive therapy, and psychological locus of control. These methods have proven helpful in allowing individuals with a victim mentality mindset to both recognize and release the mindset.

== Trauma, victimization, and victimology ==
Trauma can undermine an individual's assumptions about the world as a just and reasonable place and scientific studies have found that validation of trauma is important for therapeutic recovery. It is normal for victims to want perpetrators to take responsibility for their wrongdoing and studies conducted on patients and therapists indicate that they consider the validation of trauma and victimization as important for therapeutic recovery. De Lint and Marmo identify an 'antivictimism' mentality existing within society as a whole, and those who choose to use the label victim mentality; expecting individuals to only be "true victims" by showing fortitude and refusing to show pain, with displays of pain being seen as a sign of weakness. This will create an environment where a victim is expected to share their emotions, only to be judged for displaying them.

Victimology has studied the perceptions of victims from sociological and psychological perspectives. People who are victims of crime have a complicated relationship with the label of a victim, may feel that they are required to accept it to receive aid or for legal processes; they may feel accepting the label is necessary to avoid blame; they may want to reject it to avoid stigmatization, or give themselves a sense of agency; they may accept the label due to a desire for justice rather than sympathy. There can be a false dichotomy between the roles of victim and survivor, which either does not acknowledge the agency that victims exerted (for example, leaving their abusers) or the fact that others' behaviour caused them harm.

== Collective, competitive, and inclusive victimhood ==
=== Collective victimhood ===
Collective victimhood is a mindset shared by group members that one's own group has been harmed deliberately and undeservedly by another group. Political psychologists Bar-Tal and Chernyak-Hai write that collective victim mentality develops from a progression of self-realization, social recognition, and eventual attempts to maintain victimhood status. Researchers have observed that a strong feeling of collective victimhood is associated with a low forgiveness level and an increased desire for revenge. They found this pattern replicated in different contexts such as when thinking about the Holocaust, the conflict in Northern Ireland, and the Israeli-Palestinian conflict.

=== Competitive victimhood ===
Competitive victimhood refers to a tendency to view one's group as having suffered more compared to an adversarial group and describes the dynamic in violent, intractable conflicts where each group seeks to demonstrate that it has suffered more than the adversarial group. As a result, groups involved in violent conflicts tend to perceive their victimization as exclusive and may belittle, minimize, or even deny the adversarial group's pain and suffering. Researchers observe that competitive victimhood arises from the conflicting parties' desire to defend their moral image, restore agency, and gain power. Competitive victimhood has been found to critically and significantly hinder conflict resolution and reconciliation, as well as decrease the potential for future peaceful coexistence.

=== Inclusive victimhood ===
Some researchers have argued that victim beliefs do not necessarily contribute to group conflict, hypothesizing that victim beliefs which recognize similarities between victim groups' experiences may increase empathy and prosocial behavior toward out-groups and adversarial groups. This may aid in the reconciliation process, decreasing competitive victimhood and increasing forgiveness. Other researchers hypothesize that rather than emphasizing inclusive victimhood, the emphasis should instead be on shared humanity.

== See also ==
- DARVO
- Grievance
- Grievance studies affair
- Karpman drama triangle
- Moral agency
- Persecutory delusion
- Social psychology
- Trauma culture
- Victim blaming
- Victim playing

== Bibliography ==
- Christopher Peterson (2006). A Primer in Positive Psychology. Oxford University Press.
- Thomas J. Nevitt: The Victim Mentality. https://web.archive.org/web/20121014034523/http://aaph.org/node/214
