= Dysfunctional family =

Family dynamic

A dysfunctional family is a family in which conflict, misbehavior and often child neglect or abuse on the part of individual parents occur continuously and regularly. Children that grow up in such families may think such a situation is normal. Dysfunctional families are primarily a result of two adults, one typically overtly abusive and the other codependent, and may also be affected by substance abuse or other forms of addiction, or often by an untreated mental illness. Parents having grown up in a dysfunctional family may over-correct or emulate their own parents. In some cases, the dominant parent will abuse or neglect their children and the other parent will not object, misleading a child to assume blame.

== Examples ==
Dysfunctional family members have common features and behavior patterns as a result of their experiences within the family structure. This tends to reinforce the dysfunctional behavior, either through enabling or perpetuation. The family unit can be affected by a variety of factors.

=== Features dysfunctional families possess ===
==== Nearly universal ====
Some features are common to most dysfunctional families:

- Lack of empathy, understanding, and sensitivity towards certain family members, while expressing extreme empathy or appeasement towards one or more members who have real or perceived special needs. In other words, one family member continuously receives far more than they deserve, while another is marginalized.
- Denial – refusal to acknowledge abusive behavior, possibly believing that the situation is normal or even beneficial (also known as the "elephant in the room").
- Inadequate or missing boundaries:
  - Self – tolerating inappropriate treatment from others, failing to express what is acceptable and unacceptable treatment, tolerance of physical, emotional or sexual abuse.
  - Others – physical contact that other person dislikes, breaking important promises without just cause, purposefully violating a boundary another person has expressed.
- Extremes in conflict – either too much fighting or insufficient peaceful arguing between family members.
- Unequal or unfair treatment of one or more family members due to their birth order, gender or gender identity, age, sexual orientation, role within the family, abilities, race, caste, and so on; may include frequent appeasement of one member at the expense of others, or an uneven or inconsistent enforcement of rules.

==== Not universal ====
Though not universal among dysfunctional families and by no means exclusive to them, the following features are nevertheless typical of dysfunctional families:

- Abnormally high levels of jealousy or other controlling behaviors.
- Conflict influenced by marital status:
  - Between separated or divorced parents, usually related to, or arising from their breakup.
  - Conflict between parents who remain married, often for the perceived sake of the children, but whose separation or divorce would in fact remove a detrimental influence on those children (must be evaluated on a case-by-case basis, as a breakup may harm children).
  - Parents who wish to divorce but cannot due to financial, societal (including religious), or legal reasons.
- Children afraid to talk, either within or outside of the family, about what is happening at home, or are otherwise fearful of their parents.
- Abnormal sexual behavior such as adultery, promiscuity, or incest.
- Lack of time spent together, especially in recreational activities and social events ("we never do anything as a family").
- Parents who insist that they treat their children fairly and equitably when that is not the case.
- Family members, including children, who "disown" one another (either unilaterally or bilaterally), refusing even to be seen together in public.
- Children of parents who are experiencing a substance use disorder or who engage in binge drinking having an increased tendency to adopt substance use disorders into their own lives later on.

=== Laundry List ===
The program Adult Children of Alcoholics includes a "Laundry List", core literature of the program. This list has 14 different statements that relate to being an adult child of a parent with an alcohol addiction. These statements provide commentary on how children have been affected by the trauma of having alcoholic parents. Some highlights of the statements include, "confusing love and pity", "having low self-esteem", and having a "loss of identity". The Laundry List is a helpful tool in group therapy in order to show families that they are not alone in their struggles. Female children whose parents were alcoholics have an increased risk of developing depression. Male children of alcoholics are at a significantly higher risk for developing a substance use disorder.

== Parenting ==
=== Unhealthy signs ===
Unhealthy parenting signs, which could lead to a family becoming dysfunctional include:

- Unrealistic expectations
- Ridicule
- Conditional love
- Disrespect; especially contempt.
- Emotional intolerance (family members not allowed to express the "wrong" emotions.)
- Social dysfunction or isolation (for example, parents unwilling to reach out to other families—especially those with children of the same gender and approximate age, or do nothing to help their "friendless" child.)
- Stifled speech (children not allowed to dissent or question authority.)
- Denial of an "inner life" (children are not allowed to develop their own value systems.)
- Being under- or over-protective
- Apathy ("I don't care!")
- Belittling ("You can't do anything right!")
- Shame ("Shame on you!")
- Bitterness (regardless of what is said, using a bitter tone of voice.)
- Hypocrisy ("Do as I say, not as I do.")
- Lack of forgiveness for minor misdeeds or accidents
- Judgmental statements or demonization ("You are a liar!")
- Being overly critical and withholding proper praise. (experts say 80–90% praise, and 10–20% constructive criticism is the most healthy.)
- Double standards or giving "mixed messages" by having a dual system of values (i.e. one set for the outside world, another when in private, or teaching divergent values to each child.)
- The absentee parent (seldom available for their child due to work overload, alcohol/drug abuse, gambling, or other addictions.)
- Unfulfilled projects, activities, and promises affecting children ("We'll do it later.")
- Giving to one child what rightly belongs to another
- Gender prejudice (treats one gender of children fairly; the other unfairly.)
- Discussion and exposure to sexuality: either too much, too soon or too little, too late
- Faulty discipline based more on emotions or family politics than on established rules (e.g., punishment by "surprise".)
- Having an unpredictable emotional state due to substance abuse, personality disorder(s), or stress
- Parents always (or never) take their children's side when others report acts of misbehavior, or teachers report problems at school
- Scapegoating (knowingly or recklessly blaming one child for the misdeeds of another)
- "Tunnel vision" diagnosis of children's problems (for example, a parent may think their child is either lazy or has learning disabilities after falling behind in school despite recent absence due to illness.)
- Older siblings given either no or excessive authority over younger siblings with respect to their age difference and level of maturity.
- Frequent withholding of consent ("blessing") for culturally common, lawful, and age-appropriate activities a child wants to take part in
- The "know-it-all" (has no need to obtain child's side of the story when accusing, or listen to child's opinions on matters which greatly impact them.)
- Regularly forcing children to attend activities for which they are extremely over- or under-qualified (e.g. using a preschool to babysit a typical nine-year-old boy, taking a young child to poker games, etc.)
- Either being a miser ("scrooge") in totality or selectively allowing children's needs to go unmet (e.g. a father will not buy a bicycle for his son because he wants to save money for retirement or "something important".)
- Disagreements about nature and nurture (parents, often non-biological, blame common problems on child's heredity, when faulty parenting may be the actual cause.)

=== Dysfunctional styles ===
==== "Children as pawns" ====
One common dysfunctional parental behavior is a parent's manipulation of a child in order to achieve some outcome adverse to the other parent's rights or interests. Examples include verbal manipulation such as spreading gossip about the other parent, communicating with the parent through the child (and in the process exposing the child to the risks of the other parent's displeasure with that communication) rather than doing so directly, trying to obtain information through the child (spying), or causing the child to dislike the other parent, with insufficient or no concern for the damaging effects of the parent's behavior on the child. While many instances of such manipulation occur in shared custody situations that have resulted from separation or divorce, it can also take place in intact families, where it is known as triangulation.

==== List of other dysfunctional styles ====
- "Using" (destructively narcissistic parents who rule by fear and conditional love.)
- Abusing (parents who use physical violence, or emotionally, or sexually abuse their children.)
- Perfectionist (fixating on order, prestige, power, or perfect appearances, while preventing their child from failing at anything.)
- Dogmatic or cult-like (harsh and inflexible discipline, with children not allowed, within reason, to dissent, question authority, or develop their own value system.)
- Inequitable parenting (going to extremes for one child while continually ignoring the needs of another.)
- Deprivation (control or neglect by withholding love, support, necessities, sympathy, praise, attention, encouragement, supervision, or otherwise putting their children's well-being at risk.)
- Abuse among siblings (parents fail to intervene when a sibling physically or sexually abuses another sibling.)
- Abandonment (a parent who willfully separates from their children, not wishing any further contact, and in some cases without locating alternative, long-term parenting arrangements, leaving them as orphans.)
- Appeasement (parents who reward bad behavior—even by their own standards—and inevitably punish another child's good behavior in order to maintain the peace and avoid temper tantrums. "Peace at any price.")
- Loyalty manipulation (giving unearned rewards and lavish attention trying to ensure a favored, yet rebellious child will be the one most loyal and well-behaved, while subtly ignoring the wants and needs of their most loyal child currently.)
- "Helicopter parenting" (parents who micro-manage their children's lives or relationships among siblings—especially minor conflicts.)
- "The deceivers" (well-regarded parents in the community, likely to be involved in some charitable/non-profit works, who abuse or mistreat one or more of their children.)
- "Public image manager" (sometimes related to above, children warned to not disclose what fights, abuse, or damage happens at home, or face severe punishment "Don't tell anyone what goes on in this family".)
- "The paranoid parent" (a parent having persistent and irrational fear accompanied by anger and false accusations that their child is up to no good or others are plotting harm.)
- "No friends allowed" (parents discourage, prohibit, or interfere with their child from making friends of the same age and gender.)
- Role reversal (parents who expect their minor children to take care of them instead.)
- "Not your business" (children continuously told that a particular brother or sister who is often causing problems is none of their concern.)
- Ultra-egalitarianism (either a much younger child is permitted to do whatever an older child may, or an older child must wait years until a younger child is mature enough.)
- "The guard dog" (a parent who blindly attacks family members perceived as causing the slightest upset to their esteemed spouse, partner, or child.)
- "My baby forever" (a parent who will not allow one or more of their young children to grow up and begin taking care of themselves.)
- "The cheerleader" (one parent "cheers on" the other parent who is simultaneously abusing their child.)
- "Along for the ride" (a reluctant de facto, step, foster, or adoptive parent who does not truly care about their non-biological child, but must co-exist in the same home for the sake of their spouse or partner) (See also: Cinderella effect).
- "The politician" (a parent who repeatedly makes or agrees to children's promises while having little to no intention of keeping them.)
- "It's taboo" (parents rebuff any questions children may have about sexuality, pregnancy, romance, puberty, certain private body areas, nudity, etc.)
- Identified patient (one child who is forced into going to therapy while the family's overall dysfunction is kept hidden.)
- Münchausen syndrome by proxy (a much more extreme situation than above, where the child is intentionally made ill by a parent seeking attention from physicians and other professionals.)

== Dynamical ==
Coalitions are subsystems within families with more rigid boundaries and are thought to be a sign of family dysfunction.

- The isolated family member (either a parent or child up against the rest of the otherwise united family.)
- Parent vs. parent (frequent fights amongst adults, whether married, divorced, or separated, conducted away from the children.)
- The polarized family (a parent and one or more children on each side of the conflict.)
- Parents vs. kids (intergenerational conflict, generation gap or culture shock dysfunction.)
- The balkanized family (named after the three-way war in the Balkans where alliances shift back and forth.)
- Free-for-all (a family that fights in a "free-for-all" style, though may become polarized when range of possible choices is limited.)

== Children ==
Unlike divorce, and to a lesser extent, separation, there is often no record of an "intact" family being dysfunctional. As a result, friends, relatives, and teachers of such children may be completely unaware of the situation. In addition, a child may be unfairly blamed for the family's dysfunction, and placed under even greater stress than those whose parents separate.

=== The six basic roles ===
Children growing up in a dysfunctional family have been known to adopt or be assigned one or more of the following six basic roles:

- The Golden Child (also known as the Hero or Superkid): a child who becomes a high achiever or overachiever outside the family (e.g., in academics or athletics) as a means of escaping the dysfunctional family environment, defining themselves independently of their role in the dysfunctional family, currying favor with parents, or shielding themselves from criticism by family members.
- The Problem Child, Rebel, or Truth Teller: the child who a) causes most problems related to the family's dysfunction or b) "acts out" in response to preexisting family dysfunction, in the latter case often in an attempt to divert attention paid to another member who exhibits a pattern of similar misbehavior.
  - A variant of the "problem child" role is the Scapegoat, who is unjustifiably assigned the "problem child" role by others within the family or even wrongfully blamed by other family members for those members' own individual or collective dysfunction, often despite being the only emotionally stable member of the family.
- The Caretaker: the one who takes responsibility for the emotional well-being of the family, often assuming a parental role; the intra-familial counterpart of the "Good Child"/"Superkid."
- The Lost Child or Passive Kid: the inconspicuous, introverted, quiet one, whose needs are usually ignored or hidden.
- The Mascot or Family Clown: uses comedy to divert attention away from the increasingly dysfunctional family system.
- The Mastermind: the opportunist who capitalizes on the other family members' faults to get whatever they want; often the object of appeasement by grown-ups.

=== Effects on children ===
Children that are a product of dysfunctional families, either at the time or as they grow older, may exhibit behavior that is inappropriate for their expected stage of development due to psychological distress. Children of dysfunctional families may also behave in a manner that is relatively immature when compared to their peers. Conversely, other children may appear to emotionally "grow up too fast"; or be in a mixed mode (e.g. well-behaved, but unable to care for themselves). Children from dysfunctional environments also have a tendency to demonstrate learned unhealthy attachments due to intergenerational dysfunctional parenting.

The effects of a disordered upbringing may induce an array of mental health issues, including depression and anxiety. A disordered family environment places these young individuals at a higher risk of engaging in more severe actions of self-harm and problematic conduct. This troubled environment can also subject the youth to a significantly higher risk of becoming addicted to drugs or developing alcoholism, especially if parents or close peers have a history of substance use. Numerous studies have determined that deviant peer associations are generally associated with substance use and that parental use can account for one-half to two-thirds of future instances of chemical dependency. There is also an increased risk of the young individual developing behavioral addictions in the forms of gambling, pornography addictions, or engaging in other future detrimental activities such as compulsive spending.

Children who are raised in dysfunctional environments are also at a higher risk of developing an eating disorder, including anorexia nervosa or binge eating disorder as an emotional coping method due to psychological distress.

These young individuals may also have difficulty forming and maintaining healthy relationships within their peer group, due to social apprehensions, possible personality disorders, or post-traumatic stress disorders. A child may also demonstrate oppositional defiant characteristics by rebelling against parental authority, and non-family adults, or conversely, upholding their family's values in the face of peer pressure. Children of disordered environments may also demonstrate a lack of self-discipline when their parents are not around, or develop procrastinating tendencies that can have detrimental effects on their educational/occupational obligations.

Additionally, children may demonstrate social inadequacies by spending an inordinate amount of time engaging in activities that lack in-person social interaction. This disordered upbringing can also promote the child to project aggressive behaviors on their peers by bullying or harassing others or becoming a victim of bullying. Both of these roles often lead to an elevated risk of the child having low self-esteem issues, increased prevalence of isolation, and difficulties expressing emotions, a common effect related to emotional and physical abuse.

A lack of parental structure and positive peer influences can lead young individuals to seek alternative forms of peer alliances, including peer groups that engage in juvenile delinquency and those who perform acts that are knowingly illegal or demonstrate symptoms of an oppositional defiant disorder. This habitual behavior and environmental factors can also lead the troubled youth to a life of crime, or to become involved in gang activity.

This lack of socially normative structure and defiant behavior is also notable in cases where sexual abuse was prevalent. Early sexual experiences can lead to sexually inappropriate behavior that could lead to future interest in pedophilia, or facing charges that can result in the individual becoming a sex offender. A 1999 study determined that children who had experienced abusive sexual experiences, "as compared to those without, were more likely to be victims of physical family violence, to have run away, to be substance abusers, and to have family members with drug or alcohol problems" (Kellogg et al, 1999). Additionally, the young individual may be at an elevated risk of becoming poor or homeless, even in cases where the child's environment consisted of an average/above-average socioeconomic standing.

Further socialization problems can be demonstrated by children of dysfunctional families, including habitual or sudden academic performance problems. This notion can be more apparent as the child may exhibit a severe lack of organizational skills in their day-to-day lives. These individuals are also at an elevated inability to maintain healthy interpersonal relationships, which often includes distrusting others or even demonstrating paranoid behaviors that can be indicative of childhood trauma-induced psychosis and schizophrenia. There is also a higher probability of the youth engaging in future unstable empathetical relationships, with higher tendencies to engage in more risky behavior, including sex with multiple partners, becoming pregnant, or becoming a parent of illegitimate children.

Further dysfunctional behaviors can be perpetuated in other future relationships. An individual that was raised in a dysfunctional home environment may also pass this learned behavior on to their offspring, including their substance use habits, conflict resolution methods, and learned social boundaries. These social inadequacies can result in individuals demonstrating self-protective behaviors, to compensate for the difference in their childhoods, as they may have the inability to practice positive self-care and effective emotional coping strategies.

== In popular culture ==
- Films about dysfunctional families
- Television series about dysfunctional families
  - Animated television series about dysfunctional families

== See also ==
- Rotten kid theorem
- Abnormality (behavior)
- Alcoholism in family systems
- Domestic violence
- Family nexus
- Family therapy
- Harry Stack Sullivan
- Identified patient
- Karpman Drama Triangle
- Multisystemic therapy (MST)
- Narcissistic parent
- Parental alienation
- Parenting styles
- Psychological manipulation
- Factitious disorder imposed on another
