= Fanita English =

Romanian-American psychoanalyst and psychotherapist (1916–2022)

- Born: October 22, 1916; Galați, Romania
- Died: January 18, 2022 (aged 105); San Mateo, California
- Burial place: Torrance, California, United States
- Known for: Psychoanalysis, psychotherapy
- Children: Two, including Deirdre English

Academic background
- Education: University of Paris; Sorbonne University; Paris Institute of Psychoanalysis; Doane College; Bryn Mawr College; Columbia University
- Influences: Jean Piaget; Fritz Perls; Eric Berne; David Kupfer

Fanița English (born October 22, 1916 – January 18, 2022) was a Romanian-born American psychoanalyst and psychotherapist.

== Personal life and education ==
Fanita English was born October 22, 1916, in the city of Galați, Romania. Her parents were Jewish, and moved to Turkey when she was five. Her childhood was passed in Istanbul, leaving school when she was 15. She then trained as a secretary and worked for Warner Brothers’ films first in Bucharest and then in Paris. She then studied psychology with Jean Piaget at the Institute of Pedagogical Psychology and was awarded a diploma in psychology from the University of Paris, Sorbonne and then continued graduate studies at the Paris Institute of Psychoanalysis. She migrated to the US with her mother and step-father in 1941 and was accepted by Doane College in Nebraska. She later was awarded a scholarship to study at Bryn Mawr College, Pennsylvania and was awarded a master's degree in social work. In the USA she also studied at Columbia University, New York on mental development and child care.

After retirement she moved from Philadelphia to San Francisco, California. In 1995 she was severely burnt in a kitchen accident. The treatment resulted in addiction to opioid medicines, from which she recovered. English moved to live in San Mateo, California.

English married (although they separated in 1972) and had a son (died 1977) and daughter, Deirdre English. She died on January 18, 2022, at the age of 105.

== Career ==
English was initially a psychoanalyst. In 1949, she was the executive director of the Alexandria Family Service Agency in Washington. She then had a successful practice as a child analyst in Chicago. She was director of “Ridge Farm”, an institution for emotionally disturbed children outside Chicago from 1953 to 1956. Then, from 1956 until 1964 she was in private practice.

She later changed her practice from psychoanalysis to transactional analysis during the 1960s with the objective of providing better treatment to her patients. She completed training in psychoanalysis and gestalt therapy with Fritz Perls at the Gestalt Institute "Klevelandskom" and then trained in transaction analysis (with Eric Berne and David Kupfer). As Eric Berne's first student, she put the four basic attitudes into a developmental psychological context and added the fifth variant, "I'm ok - you're ok - realistic". English began working as a transactional analyst in Chicago and also taught part-time at Chicago University.

In 1970 she founded the Eastern Institute for TA and Gestalt in Philadelphia where she worked until 1979. She then lectured and gave workshops in Europe (Germany, France, Austria, Switzerland and Italy) until her retirement in 1993. Although she retired in 1993, after a two-year break she resumed writing and giving some workshops in the US but mostly in Europe.

English made theoretical and practical contributions to transactional analysis. She proposes three basic instincts, namely the instincts of experience, creation and serenity. They are in balance since as they are required as essential parts of a human. She connects deeply analytical methods with behavioural ones to, for example, explain the experience of concepts. The concepts of substitute feelings, childhood adaptations, episcripts, and motivators are ones that she particularly explored.

She was a board member of the International Transactional Analysis Association.

== Awards ==
In 1978, English received the Eric Byrne Memorial Scientific Award. This was for her work on The Substitution Factor. She was given this award again in 1997. In 2010 English was awarded a gold medal by the European Association for Transactional Analysis for her outstanding contributions over forty years. The International Transactional Analysis Association established the Fanita English Lifetime Achievement Award in her honour, and English was its first recipient in 2020.

== Publications ==
English published in learned journals and also books. Her publications include:

- English, Fanita & Pischetsrieder Gerd: Ich – Beruf, Leben, Beziehungen. (I - job, life, relationships) Hamburg: Pischetsrieder Consulting 1996.
- English, Fanita & Wonneberger Klaus-Dieter: Wenn Verzweiflung zu Gewalt wird … Gewalttaten und ihre verborgenen Ursachen. (When despair turns into violence ... acts of violence and their hidden causes ) Paderborn: Junfermann Verlag 1992.
- Tauschhandel der Gefühle – Transaktionsanalyse mit Fanita English (Barter of Feelings - Transaction Analysis with Fanita English )(videocassette) Erlangen: Universität Erlangen-Nürnberg 1987
- Es ging doch gut – was ging denn schief? Beziehungen in Partnerschaft, Familie und Beruf. (It went well - what went wrong? Relationships in partnership, family and work ) Munich: Christian Kaiser Verlag 1982/1992 (now Bertelsmann, 6th edition)
- Was werde ich morgen tun? (What will I do tomorrow) Berlin: Institut für Kommunikationstherapie, 1980. ISBN 3-9800439-0-8 from the English original What shall I do tomorrow in G. Barnes (ed.) (1977) pages 287–347
- Transaktionsanalyse – Gefühle und Ersatzgefühle in Beziehungen. (Transactional Analysis - Feelings and Substitutes in Relationships ) Hamburg 1991, 3rd revised edition of Transaktionale Analyse und Skriptanalyse: Aufsätze u. Vorträge von Fanita English Hilarion Petzold & M. Paula (eds.) – Dt. Studienausg. Hamburg: Wissenschaftlicher Verlag Altmann, 1976 from original Selected Articles (1976)
