= Playing the victim =

Fabrication or exaggeration of victimhood

Playing the victim (also known as victim playing, victim card, or self-victimization) is the perceived fabrication or exaggeration of victimhood for a variety of reasons such as to justify abuse to others, to manipulate others, a coping strategy, attention seeking or diffusion of responsibility. A person who repeatedly does this is known as a professional victim. An actual victim is someone or something that has been hurt, damaged, or killed or has suffered, either because of the actions of someone or something else, or because of illness or chance.

== For abuse ==
Victim playing by abusers is either:

- Dehumanization, diverting attention away from acts of abuse by claiming that the abuse was justified based on another person's bad behavior (typically the victim).
- Grooming for abusive power and control by soliciting sympathy from others to gain their assistance in supporting or enabling the abuse of a victim (known as proxy abuse).

It is common for abusers to engage in victim playing. This serves two purposes:

- Justification, to themselves, in transactional analysis known as existential validation, as a way of dealing with the cognitive dissonance that results from inconsistencies between the way they treat others and what they believe about themselves.
- Justification to others as a strategy of evading or deflecting harsh judgment or condemnation they may fear from others.

== For manipulation ==
Manipulators often play the victim role ("woe is me") by portraying themselves as victims of circumstances or someone else's behavior in order to gain pity or sympathy or to evoke compassion and thereby get something from someone. Caring and conscientious people cannot stand to see anyone suffering, and the manipulator often finds it easy and rewarding to play on sympathy to get cooperation.

While portraying oneself as a victim can be highly successful in obtaining goals over the short-term, this method tends to be less successful over time. Dutch management scholar Manfred F.R. Kets de Vries writes that:

Victims' talent for high drama draws people to them like moths to a flame. Their permanent dire state brings out the altruistic motives in others. It is difficult to ignore constant cries for help. In most instances, however, the help given is of short duration. And like moths in a flame, helpers quickly get burned; nothing seems to work to alleviate the victims' miserable situation; there is no movement for the better. Any efforts rescuers make are ignored, belittled, or met with hostility. No wonder that the rescuers become increasingly frustrated – and walk away.

Victim playing may also be an attention-seeking technique, as in Münchausen syndrome.

== In political context ==
According to Bosnian political theorist Jasmin Hasanović, in the post-Yugoslav context, the repeated emphasis on narratives of victimhood can function as a form of auto-colonialism. Hasanović argues that this dynamic reinforces regional stereotypes associated with the Balkans and aligns with external narratives that portray the region as inherently prone to conflict. In his view, this framing sustains a perception of continuous fear and conflict, which can contribute to the persistence of ethnonationalist ideologies.

== In media ==
Selective portrayal of different groups or individuals as victims is used by the media to appeal to the sympathy of and mobilize both the political left and right. Groups or individuals are often selected based on class, race, ethnicity, gender, age and/or sexuality.

== In corporate life ==
The language of "victim playing" has entered modern corporate life, as a potential weapon of all professionals. To define victim-players as dishonest may be an empowering response; as too may be awareness of how childhood boundary issues can underlie the tactic.

In the hustle of office politics, the term may however be abused so as to penalize the legitimate victim of injustice, as well as the role-player.

== Underlying psychology ==
Transactional analysis distinguishes real victims from those who adopt the role in bad faith, ignoring their own capacities to improve their situation. Among the predictable interpersonal "games" psychiatrist Eric Berne identified as common among victim-players are "Look How Hard I've Tried" and "Wooden Leg".

R. D. Laing considered that "it will be difficult in practice to determine whether or to what extent a relationship is collusive" – when "the one person is predominantly the passive 'victim'", and when they are merely playing the victim. The problem is intensified once a pattern of victimization has been internalised, perhaps in the form of a double bind.

Object relations theory has explored the way possession by a false self can create a permanent sense of victimisation – a sense of always being in the hands of an external fate.

To break the hold of the negative complex, and to escape the passivity of victimhood, requires taking responsibility for one's own desires and long-term actions.

== See also ==
- Divine retribution
- Karpman drama triangle
- Trauma culture
- Victim mentality
- DARVO
