= Violation paradigm =

A violation paradigm is a scientific method where the scientist perturbs an expected factor to look at the subject's following reactions. These reactions are believed to be relevant to the process studied. For example, creating wrong word segmentations in a text will destabilize the reader. This warns the researcher that the respondent's brain considers the characters are united into words, and not just as a succession of given sets of letters. The process was originally developed by Danks, Bohn & Fear (1983), and proved valid (Chen 1999).

== See also ==
- Danks, Bohn, Fear (1983), Comprehension processes in oral reading, The process of language understanding, pp. 193–223.
- Chen, H.-C. (1999), "How do readers of Chinese process words during reading for comprehension ?", Reading Chinese Script: A Cognitive Analysis, Routledge, pp. 257–278, ISBN 9780805824780
