= Triangulation (psychology) =

Theory related to Murray Bowen

Triangulation is a term in psychology most closely associated with the work of Murray Bowen known as family therapy. Bowen considered a two-person emotional system to be unstable. He also observed that two people seem emotionally closer when excluding a third party. Bowen therefore theorized that under stress, couples gravitate towards third parties to create "triangles", with two of the members always being closest - although which two are "in", and which member is "out", may be constantly shifting.

== Family theory ==
In the family triangulation system, the third person can either be used as a substitute for direct communication or can be used as a messenger to carry the communication to the main party. Usually, this communication is an expressed dissatisfaction with the main party. For example, in a dysfunctional family in which there is alcoholism present, the non-drinking parent will go to a child and express dissatisfaction with the drinking parent. This includes the child in the discussion of how to solve the problem of the alcoholic parent. Sometimes the child can engage in the relationship with the parent, filling the role of the third party, and thereby being "triangulated" into the relationship. Alternatively, the child may then go to the alcoholic parent, relaying what they were told. In instances when this occurs, the child may be forced into a role of a "surrogate spouse". The reason that this occurs is that both parties are dysfunctional. Rather than communicating directly with each other, they utilize a third party. Sometimes this is because it is unsafe to go directly to the person and discuss the concerns, particularly if they are alcoholic and/or abusive.

In a triangular family relationship, the two who have aligned risk forming an enmeshed relationship.

=== Positive and negative triangulation ===
Triangulation can be a constructive and stabilizing factor. Triangulation can also be a destructive and destabilizing factor. Destabilizing or "bad triangulation" can polarize communications and escalate conflict. Understanding the difference between stabilizing triangulation and destabilizing triangulation helps avoid destabilizing situations. Triangulation may be overt, which is more commonly seen in high-conflict families, or covert.

A 2016 longitudinal study of adolescent relationship skills found that teens who were triangulated into parental conflicts more frequently used positive conflict resolution techniques with their own dating partner, but were also more likely to engage in verbally abusive behaviors.

=== The Perverse Triangle ===
The Perverse Triangle was first described in 1977 by Jay Haley as a triangle where two people who are on different hierarchical or generational levels form a coalition against a third person (e.g., "a covert alliance between a parent and a child, who band together to undermine the other parent's power and authority".) The perverse triangle concept has been widely discussed in professional literature. Bowen called it the pathological triangle, while Minuchin called it the rigid triangle. For example, a parent and child can align against the other parent but not admit to it, to form a cross-generational coalition. These are harmful to children.

== Child development ==
In the field of psychology, triangulations are necessary steps in the child's development. When a two-party relationship is opened up by a third party, a new form of relationship emerges and the child gains new mental abilities. The concept was introduced in 1971 by the Swiss psychiatrist Ernst L. Abelin, especially as 'early triangulation', to describe the transitions in psychoanalytic object relations theory and parent-child relationship in the age of 18 months. In this presentation, the mother is the early caregiver with a nearly "symbiotic" relationship to the child, and the father lures the child away to the outside world, resulting in the father being the third party. Abelin later developed an 'organizer- and triangulation-model', in which he based the whole human mental and psychic development on several steps of triangulation.

Some earlier related work, published in a 1951 paper, had been done by the German psychoanalyst Hans Loewald in the area of pre-Oedipal behavior and dynamics. In a 1978 paper, the child psychoanalyst Selma Kramer wrote that Loewald postulated the role of the father as a positive supporting force for the pre-Oedipal child against the threat of re-engulfment by the mother which leads to an early identification with the father, preceding that of the classical Oedipus complex. This was also related to the work in Separation-Individuation theory of child development by the psychoanalyst Margaret Mahler.

== Destabilizing triangulation ==
Destabilizing triangulation occurs when a person attempts to control the flow, interpretation, and nuances of communication between two separate actors or groups of actors, thus ensuring communications flow through, and constantly relate back to them. Examples include a parent attempting to control communication between two children, or a relationship partner attempting to control communication between the other partner and the other partner's friends and family. Another example is to put a third actor between them and someone with whom they are commonly in conflict. Rather than communicating directly with the actor with whom they are in conflict, they will send communication supporting his or her case through a third actor in an attempt to make the communication more credible. Destabilizing triangulation can adversely impact children, who may experience increased anxiety and self-blame due to involvement in marital disputes between their parents.

== See also ==
- Karpman drama triangle
- Mind games
- Parental alienation
- Destabilisation
