= Claude Steiner =

American psychotherapist (1935–2017)

Claude Michel Steiner
- Born: 6 January 1935; Paris, France
- Died: 9 January 2017 (aged 82); Ukiah, California, U.S.
- Education: University of Michigan
- Occupations: psychotherapist, writer
- Writing career
- Period: 1970s–2017
- Genre: transactional analysis
- Subjects: life scripts, alcoholism, emotional literacy
- Notable work: Warm Fuzzy Tale

Claude Michel Steiner (6 January 1935 – 9 January 2017) was a French-born American psychotherapist and writer who wrote extensively about transactional analysis (TA). His writings focused especially on life scripts, alcoholism, emotional literacy, and interpersonal power plays.

In the 1970s and 1980s, Steiner was a founder and practitioner of Radical Psychiatry, a new approach to psychotherapy based in a social theory (of alienation) rather than a medical one (of individual pathology). Influenced by progressive movements of the time, work in this modality continues into the present and is gaining recent recognition worldwide. He was also considered the originator of the theory called Stroke Economy, in collaboration with Hogie Wyckoff.

== Early life ==
Steiner was born in Paris, France. His parents were Austrian, his mother Ashkenazi Jewish and his father white. The family left France in 1939 ahead of the impending Nazi invasion. Eventually the family settled in Mexico. In 1952, Steiner went to the United States to study engineering. In 1957 he met and became a follower of Eric Berne, a psychiatrist and founder of the transactional analysis school of psychotherapy. In 1965 he obtained a PhD in clinical psychology at the University of Michigan, Ann Arbor. He was a founding member and teaching member of the International Transactional Analysis Association.

== Radical Psychiatry movement ==
The Radical Psychiatry movement was borne out of the greater anti-psychiatry movement of the 1960s and continues to this day. The movement's key critiques and philosophies have their roots in the work of thought leaders, R.D. Laing, Thomas Szasz, Frantz Fanon, Herbert Marcuse, Erich Fromm, Wilhelm Reich, and notably Eric Berne, the originator of transactional analysis, who was one of Steiner's primary mentors. In 1969, Steiner joined the Berkeley Free Clinic to start a psychological counseling center to practice an early form of Radical Psychiatry, and in part to address the emotional needs of the influx of mostly white young people drawn to the Bay Area by stories of "flower-child" utopia. Shortly after, he was joined by Hogie Wyckoff and Joy Marcus, later to become leading feminist thinkers, who contributed key theoretical foundations to a theory of Radical Psychiatry, which were later published in an early "Manifesto" written by Steiner & Wyckoff to be distributed at the American Psychology Association conference San Francisco in September 1970 as a part of a coalition of women, homosexuals, mental patients, and others who felt oppressed by psychiatric practice and organized to disrupt the meeting.

While Steiner's training with Berne gave him prowess as a therapist and an outsider lens on the practice of psychiatry and psychology, along with a platform and resources to explore ideas, others contributed many of the core concepts of Radical Psychiatry. Steiner encouraged development of the theory and was dutiful in sharing credit. In particular, Hogie Wyckoff's grounding in feminism and Marxism contributed significant key ideas such as the "Pig Parent", alienation as the root of mental disorders, and the stroke economy while Joy Marcus' community organizing experience highlighted isolation as a key component of alienation and the need for political action, not just awareness, to address alienation. Other key contributors to Radical Psychiatry theory were Robert Schwebel (who initially developed their theory of cooperation), Becky Jenkins (who developed a robust approach to mediations), Darca Nicholson (who contributed bodywork as a key component of the work) and Beth Roy (who further developed models of power analysis, and significantly furthered their approach to mediations, amongst other contributions). Many of these contributors were also recruited and initially trained by Steiner in Transactional Analysis and group work.

This core group all practiced within the "RAP Center" (also called the Radical Psychiatry Center), along with many others who, together, offered daily drop-in "problem solving" groups free to anyone who needed them in a dedicated building. However, as theoretical controversies developed, dozens of collective groups were reduced down to a handful of people (in particular those mentioned above) which continued meeting for two decades. This group, referred to as the Bay Area Radical Psychiatry Collective (BARP), published a quarterly journal "Issues in Radical Therapy", an annual 4-day event referred to as the Summer Institute - a teaching institute, eclectic conference, and celebration of a national network, and a collectively drafted manual outlining the practices of Radical Psychiatry (edited by Roy and Steiner). Many of the BARP members also lived together in collective housing during this time.

Separately, in 1970, a Radical Therapy Collective from Minot, North Dakota started an anti-psychiatry publication named "The Radical Therapist." Steiner, along with other members of the BARP, contributed articles in The Radical Therapist, until the publication changed its name in 1972 to the Rough Times, due to an ideological turn in its organizers and readership away from any association with the institution of therapy and towards mental health patient organizing against psychiatric incarceration and other staunch anti-psychiatric activities. Around the mid 1970s, psychiatry in the U.S. became more about prescribing drugs and since there was an existing greater movement from many independent sources towards radicalizing therapy, the BARP started referring to themselves as Radical Therapists.

By 1979, the BARP experienced critique due to the power the group accumulated through their success in publishing and teaching. Their authority began to resemble an institution, the very thing they had set out to deconstruct. The group also reported experiencing internal dynamics of burnout and overblown sense of responsibility, and for these reasons, they disbanded and gave away the Issues in Radical Therapy to a group in Colorado and the Summer Institute to a group in San Francisco, which both shortly thereafter ceased activities. However, the practice of Radical Psychiatry continues across the U.S. as well in Germany and other European countries, where it is combined with Co-counselling practices. While the movement was originally largely white, in part due to the demographics of Berkeley in the 60s and 70s, this is changing in modern practice of Radical Psychiatry.

== Politics ==
Steiner was active in political causes. He opposed America's role in Vietnam War and was an outspoken critic of U.S. policy and actions involving Latin America. Steiner summarized his views in his conclusion to his treatise called "Transactional Analysis in the Information Age".

It seems that many in Transactional Analysis are impatient with the state of transactional analysis as a dynamic, developing theory. For myself, I have thought at times that Transactional Analysis has had its day. Many of its ideas have been silently incorporated into the psychiatric culture, but on the whole its point has been missed and it has not been given a place among the great psychiatric theories of the century and I was ready to put it to rest. Accordingly I followed my interest in power and its abuses away from Transactional Analysis into propaganda, journalism and Central American politics. From the distant perspective of an investigator into media and information, in a dawning Information Age I came to see Transactional Analysis in a brand new light; as a visionary theory of Information Age psychology and psychiatry. As the world peers into the twenty-first century with every one wondering how they will be affected by the looming millennial changes, we, in Transactional Analysis, are in possession of a legacy which is only now becoming clear: we have the tools and the insights of an Information Age, communication-based psychology and psychiatry.

== A Warm Fuzzy Tale ==
A Warm Fuzzy Tale is a 1970 story by Steiner. The fairy tale–like story introduces "strokes" and other ideas about social interaction and emotion derived from transactional analysis. It was republished in 1977 as The Original Warm Fuzzy Tale with illustration by Jo Ann Dick, and has since been translated into multiple languages. The slang term warm fuzzies, a reference to positive feelings, derives from the book and its adaptations. The story and ideas derived from it are sometimes used in teaching or counseling about emotion and interaction. In the story, people exchange things called "warm fuzzies" which make them feel happy and warm. A bad witch convinces one character that warm fuzzies are in limited supply and should not be given away. Instead, the witch induces people to exchange "cold pricklies" which make them feel cold. These exchanges symbolize Steiner and Eric Berne's notion of "strokes", recognition and emotional support among people. The story ends by inviting the reader to make warm fuzzies abundant "by freely giving and asking for Warm Fuzzies and being as loving and healthy as you can".

== Death ==
Steiner died at his ranch in Ukiah, California on 9 January 2017, three days after his 82nd birthday.

== Publications ==
- 1962 "'No Exit' Revisited". Transactional Analysis Bulletin 1962, #4
- 1966 "Script and Counterscript". Transactional Analysis Bulletin 1966, #18
  - "Script Analysis Section: Introductory Remarks". Transactional Analysis Bulletin 1966, #19
- 1967 A Script Checklist, Transactional Analysis Bulletin 1967, # 22
  - "The Treatment of Alcoholism", Transactional Analysis Bulletin 1967, #23
- 1968 "The Alcoholic Game", Transactional Analysis Bulletin 1968, #25
  - "Transactional Analysis as a Treatment Philosophy", Transactional Analysis Bulletin 1968, #27
  - with Ursula Steiner: "Permission Classes", Transactional Analysis Bulletin 1968, #28
- 1969 A Warm Fuzzy Tale
  - "TA Made Simple". RaPress. Berkeley
  - with William Cassidy: "Therapeutic Contracts in Group Treatment", Transactional Analysis Bulletin 1969, #30
  - "The Alcoholic Game", Quarterly Journal of Studies on Alcohol Vol 30 # 4 pp 920–938
  - "Alcoholism". Transactional Analysis Bulletin 1969 #32
- 1970 Games Alcoholics Play. Grove Press, New York, NY.
  - "A Fairytale". Transactional Analysis Bulletin 1970, Vol. 9 #36
  - Alcoholismo: Una Applicacion Practica del Analisis Transaccional. Editorial V Siglos. 1976
  - Alkoholist Spel; Analys av Livsmonster. Studentlitteratur. Stockholm. 1981
  - A Quoi Jouent Les Alcoholiques; Un nouvelle approche de l'analyse transactionelle. Epi editeurs. 1981
  - Nog Eentje Dan Een: Psychotreapeutische Behandeling van Alcoholisme. Uitgeverij Bert Bakker. Amsterdam 1979
- 1971 with John Dusay: "Transactional Analysis" in Comprehensive Group Psychotherapy, R Corsini, ed. Williams and Wilkins, 1971
  - "The Stroke Economy" Transactional Analysis Journal 1971 No. 03
  - "A Little Boy's Dream" Transactional Analysis Journal 1971 No. 01
- 1972 "The 1971 Eric Berne Scientific Award Acceptance Lecture" (awarded for the article "Script and Counterscript" Transactional Analysis Bulletin 1966, #18) Transactional Analysis Journal 1972, Vol 2 #1.
  - "Radical Psychiatry Manifesto" The Radical Therapist, Jerome Agel, editor. Ballantine 1972
  - "Scripts Revisited" Transactional Analysis Journal 1972 No. 02
  - "My Insides Were Once A safe Place" and "Two Love Poems", Poem-maker Soul-healer, Radical Psychiatry Community Press, Berkeley
  - "If I do My Thing" poem, circa 1972 Can be found in "Emotional Literacy Training: The Application of Transactional Analysis to the Study of Emotions" Transactional Analysis Journal 1996, January #1.
- 1973 "Letter to a Brother: Reflections on Men's Liberation", Issues in Radical Therapy, Vol. I No. I, Jan 15, 1973, p. 15.
  - "Inside T.A." Issues in Radical Therapy Vol. I No. II, Spring '73, p. 3.
  - "Cooperation", Issues in Radical Therapy Vol. I No. III, Summer '73, p. 7.
  - "The Rescue Triangle", Issues in Radical Therapy Vol. I No. 4, Autumn '73, p. 20
- 1974 Scripts People Live. Grove Press, NY.
  - Des Scenarios et des Hommes: Analyse transactionelle des scenarios de vie. Desclee de Brouwer. Paris 1996
  - Los Guiones que Vivimos. Kairos. Barcelona 1991
  - Wie Man Lebensplane Verendert. Die arbeit mit skripts in der transactionsanalyse. Junferman. Padeborn. Germany 1982
  - Op Doop Spoor; Transactionele analyse van levensscripten. Uitgeverij Bert Bakker. Amsterdam 1975
  - Os Papeis Que Vivemos Na Vida; Analise transacional de nossas interpretacoes cotidianas. Artenova. Rio de Janeiro Brazil 1976
  - Copioni di Vita. Editizioni La Vita Felice. Milano. 1999 www.lavitafelice.it
  - "Wilheim Reich: A Defeated Revolutionary" Issues in Radical Therapy Vol.2 No. 2, Spring 1974, p. 10.
  - "We Are All Outlaws," Issues in Radical Therapy Vol. 2 No. 3 Summer 1974, p. 26.
  - "Power: Part I" Issues in Radical Therapy Vol 3 #4
- 1975 Readings in Radical Psychiatry. Claude Steiner, Editor. Grove Press, NY
  - "Power: Part II" Issues in Radical Therapy Vol. 4 No. 1, Winter '75, p. 20.
  - "The Expanding Shrink", Issues in Radical Therapy Vol. 3 no. 1, Winter '75, p. 26.
  - "Editorial" Issues in Radical Therapy Vol. 3 No. 3, Summer '75, p. 3.
  - with Spence Meigham "An Interview with R.D. Laing" Issues in Radical Therapy Vol 3, No. 4, autumn '75, p. 3
- 1976 Beyond Games and Scripts. Claude Steiner, Editor. Grove Press, NY
  - "Group Editorial" (including Claude Steiner) Issues in Radical Therapy Vol. 4 No. 2, Spring '76, p. 22.
  - "Cooperative Living" Issues in Radical Therapy Vol. 4 No. 3, Summer '76, p. 8.
  - "Working Cooperatively", Issues in Radical Therapy Vol. 4 No. 4, Fall '76, p. 22.
  - "Socially Responsible Therapy: Reflections on 'The Female Juvenile Delinquent' Transactional Analysis Journal 1976 No. 01
- 1977 The Warm Fuzzy Tale. Jalmar Press, Sacramento, CA. 1977
  - Steiner, Claude (1977). The Original Warm Fuzzy Tale. Illustrations by JoAnn Dick (1st book ed.). Sacramento, Calif.: Jalmar Press. ISBN 0915190087. LCCN 78-77981. OCLC 3360087.
    - Claude M. Steiner (2024). The Original Warm Fuzzy Tale. Illustrations by Huynh Kim Lien (Reprint ed.). N/a: Doohan Family Medicine Consultants. ISBN 979-8991133432.
  - Le Conte Chaud et Doux des Chaudoudoux. InterEditions. Paris. 1984
  - "Cooperative Meetings", Issues in Radical Therapy, #18 Winter 1977, p. 11.
  - "The Principles Revised" Issues in Radical Therapy #19, Spring 1977, p. 12.
  - "Feminism for Men", Issues in Radical Therapy #20 Fall 1977, p. 3.
- 1978 "Back at the Ranch", Issues in Radical Therapy # 21, winter '78, p. 28.
  - "Feminism for Men, Part II", Issues in Radical Therapy # 22, Spring '78, p. 3.
  - "The Pig Parent", Issues in Radical Therapy # 23, Summer '78, p. 5.
  - "Living Visions: Round Mountain Update", Issues in Radical Therapy # 24, Fall '78, p. 9.
- 1979 Healing Alcoholism. Grove Press, NY.
  - "Radical Psychiatry; Once Again with Feeling", Issues in Radical Therapy # 25, Spring '79, p. 27.
  - "Editorial", Issues in Radical Therapy # 28, Winter '79, p. 3.
  - "Cooperation", Issues in Radical Therapy # 27, Fall '79, p. 3.
  - "The Pig Parent" Transactional Analysis Journal 1979 No. 01
- 1980 A Manual on Cooperation. Inkworks Press. Oakland, California
  - "The Human Potential Movement and Transformation: A conversation with George Leonard" The Script Volume 10 # 5 June 1980
  - "Editorial", Issues in Cooperation and Power, # 2, Summer '80, p. 3.
  - "Mediations" with Becky Jenkins, Issues in Cooperation and Power # 3, Fall 80, p. 4.
  - "Editorial", Issues in Cooperation and Power # 4, Winter '80, p. 3.
- 1981 The Other Side of Power. Grove Press, NY.
  - "The 1980 Eric Berne Scientific Award Acceptance Lecture" (awarded for the article "The Stroke Economy" Transactional Analysis Journal 1971, #3) Transactional Analysis Journal 1981, #1.
  - The Other Side of Power. Grove Press, NY.
  - O Outro Lado Do Poder; Como tornar-se poderoso sem ter sede de poder. Nobel. São Paulo. 1984
  - Macht Ohne Ausbebeutung; Zu okologie zwishenmenschlicher beziehungen. Junferman. Padeborn. Germany. 1985
  - L'autre Face de Pouvoir. Desclee de Brouwer. Paris 1995
  - "Radical Psychiatry—Once Again with Feeling", # 25, Spring '79, p. 27.
  - "Monogamy, Non-monogamy, and Omnigamy", Issues in Cooperation and Power # 5, Spring '81, p. 4.
  - Omnigamy in Iowa Issues in Cooperation and Power #7, Fall '81, p. 18. (Claude Steiner ed.)
- 1984 Emotional Literacy Transactional Analysis Journal 1984 No. 03
- 1986 When a Man Loves a Woman. Grove Press, NY.
  - Quando un Homem Ama Uma Mulher. Editora Gente 1993 São Paulo Brazil
- 1987 "The Seven Sources of Power: An Alternative to Authority" Transactional Analysis Journal 1987 No. 3
- 1995 "Thirty Years of Psychotherapy and Transactional Analysis in 1,500 Words or Less" Transactional Analysis Journal 1995 January #1
- 1996 "Emotional Literacy Training: The Application of Transactional Analysis to

the Study of Emotions" Transactional Analysis Journal 1996, January #1.

- 1997 Achieving Emotional Literacy. Avon Books, New York.
  - Emotinale Kompetenz. Hanser. Munchen 1997
  - Educacao Emocional. Un programa personalizado para desenvolver sua inteligencia emocional. Objetiva. Rio de Janeiro. 1988
  - Emotioneel Vaardig Worden. Een persoonlijke cursus om emotioneel intelligent te worden. Uitgeverij De Arbeiderspers. Amsterdam. * 1998 L'ABC des Emotions; Developer son intelligence emotionelle. InterEditions, Paris 1998
  - L'Alfabeto delle Emozioni. Sperling and Kupfer. Milano. 1999
  - La Educacion Emocional. Javier Vergara. Buenos Aires. Argentina.1998
  - Laer At Laese Folesler, Ashehoug Dansk Forlag, 1999
  - There is also a Chinese edition by Morningstar Publishing Co. 1999
  - "Transactional Analysis in the Information Age." Transactional Analysis Journal, 1997 January # 1
- 1998 "Critique of Integrative Psychotherapy" Letter to the editor The Script #4 May–June 1998
  - "Steiner and Erskine/Trautman Dialogue Continues" Letter to the Editor. The Script#8 Nov. 1978
- 2000 "The Meming of Love; Invention of the Human Heart." Keynote lecture at the 3rd Adolescence Health Conference at the Royal College of Physicians in London, October 2000. Available on www.emotional-literacy.com/meming.htm
  - "Apology: The Transactional Analysis of a Fundamental Exchange." Transactional Analysis Journal 2000 July # 4
- 2001 "Radical Psychiatry." In Handbook of Innovative Psychotherapies, Raymond Corsini, ed.: New York, Wiley and sons 2001
  - "Science and Transactional Analysis" The Script Jan-Feb
  - "Finding Correlates to Flights of Fancy" The Script July
- 2002 "The Development of Transactional Analysis Theory and Practice: A Brief History" The Script December 2002
  - "The Adult; Once Again, with Feeling" Transactional Analysis Journal January 2002 #1
- 2003 Emotional Literacy; Intelligence With a Heart. Personhood Press. Fawnskin, California
  - Response to Helen Hargaden's article (Script July, 2003) about Eric Berne" A letter to the editor in The Script August 2003
  - "Theoretical Musings about Ego States" The Script August 2003
  - "Editorial: Core Concepts." Special Issue on Core Concepts Transactional Analysis Journal, #2, April 2003
  - "Core Concepts of a Stroke Centered Transactional Analysis" Transactional Analysis Journal, #2 April 2003
- 2004 Understanding the Enigma of Eric Berne The Script May–June 2004
  - "Novey Research Shows Effectiveness of Transactional Analysis." An Interview with Ted Novey. The Script November 2004
- 2005 "Transactional Analysis: An Elegant Theory and Practice." The Script, March 2005
  - With Michele Novellino. Theoretical Diversity; A Debate about Transactional Analysis and Psychoanalysis. Transactional Analysis Journal, #2 April 2005.
- 2006 "Transactional Analysis and Psychoanalysis Writing Styles," Transactional Analysis Journal #3, October 2006

== See also ==
- Script Analysis
