= Economic terrorism =

Deliberate disruption of trade or finance

The term economic terrorism is strictly defined to indicate an attempt at economic destabilization by a group. More precisely, in 2005 the Geneva Centre for Security Policy defined economic terrorism in the following terms:

Contrary to "economic warfare" which is undertaken by states against other states, "economic terrorism" would be undertaken by transnational or non-state actors. This could entail varied, coordinated and sophisticated or massive destabilizing actions in order to disrupt the economic and financial stability of a state, a group of states or a society (such as market oriented western societies) for ideological or religious motives. These actions, if undertaken, may be violent or not. They could have either immediate effects or carry psychological effects which in turn have economic consequences.

== Impact on supply chains ==
Financial terrorism (also known as economic terrorism) most commonly refers to the secret manipulation of a nation's economy by state or non-state actors. However, economic terrorism may also be unconcealed, arguably in the name of economic sanctions. Economic terrorism targets civilians of nations or groups in the pursuit of political aims.

Terroristic attacks against ports and land borders cause extra measures to be implemented to ensure the safe arrival of the product. These measures force the cost of exporting and importing goods to increase. Emerging economies are the most affected, because the slowing of exports and imports will affect the country’s ability to combat poverty. An increase in poverty can cause revolts among the population and possible political destabilization, forcing an even greater increase in poverty.

To counter piracy, governments and maritime industries must take preventative measures. The United States Maritime Administration says "These actions may include a larger military presence in high-risk areas, rerouting ships to bypass the Gulf of Aden, paying higher insurance premiums, hiring private security guards, and installing non-lethal deterrent equipment." The cost of these preventative measures is passed on to consumers and tax payers, ultimately directing money away from other areas of the economy.

== See also ==
- Corporate warfare
- Critical infrastructure protection
- Cyberwarfare
- Destabilisation
- Economic warfare
- Sabotage
- State terrorism
