= Script analysis =

Transactional analysis method

Script analysis is the method of uncovering the "early decisions, made unconsciously, as to how life shall be lived". It is one of the five clusters in transactional analysis, involving "a progression from structural analysis, through transactional and game analysis, to script analysis". Eric Berne, the father of transactional analysis, focused on individual and group psychotherapy, but transactional analysis and script analysis is also considered in educational and organisational settings.

The purpose of script analysis is to aid the patient to achieve autonomy by recognising the script's influence on values, decisions, behaviors and thereby allowing them to decide against the script. Berne describes someone who is autonomous as being "script free" and as a "real person".

Script analysis at the individual level considers that "from the early transactions between mother, father and child, a life plan evolves. This is called the script...or unconscious life plan". Script analysts work on the assumption that a person's behavior is partly programmed by the script, "the life plan set down in early life. Fortunately, scripts can be changed, since they are not inborn, but learned".

== History ==
Eric Berne introduced the concept of the script in "the first complete presentation, and still the fundamental work on transactional analysis...Transactional Analysis in Psychotherapy [1961]", since when "definitive studies of the origins and analysis of scripts are being conducted by a number of Transactional Analysts".

In that work, Berne described "a true long-term script, with all three aspects of protocol, script proper, and adaptation". For Berne, "the household drama which is played out to an unsatisfactory conclusion in the first years of life is called the protocol...an archaic version of the Oedipus drama". Thereafter "the script proper...is a unconscious derivative of the protocol", which in later life, as "compromised in accordance with the available realities...is technically called the adaptation".

Berne himself noted that "of all those who preceded transactional analysis, Alfred Adler comes the closest to talking like a script analyst," with his concept of "the life plan...which determines his life-line".

== Winners and losers ==
Berne came to believe that "from earliest months, the child is taught not only what to do, but also what to see, hear, touch, think, and feel....each person obediently ends up at the age of five or six with a script of life plan largely dictated by his parents. It tells him how he's going to carry on his life, and how it's going to end, winner, non-winner, or loser". That is, the child is given information both about themselves and also about the external world (which may be factually correct or incorrect) by the parent concomitant with which the child is encouraged by the parent to use this information in order to decide how to live.

For Berne, "a winner is defined as a person who fulfills his contract with the world and with himself", and the object of psychotherapy was to "break up scripts and make losers into non-winners ('Making progress') and non-winners into winners ('Getting well', 'Flipping in', and 'Seeing the light')".

In the first flush of enthusiasm for script analysis, proponents would proudly proclaim that "my experience is that most people with a loser's script can change this to a winner's script during the process of therapy". Later practitioners would more cautiously observe that "'script cure'...is seldom a once-for-all event. Much more often, cure is a matter of progressively learning to exercise new choices".

== Psychology of human destiny ==
Drawing on the work of Freud, Jung, and Joseph Campbell, in The Hero With A Thousand Faces, Berne argued that fairy-tales, legends, mythology and drama were the early tools for mankind "to distill out and record the more homely and recognizable patterns of human living" - and that they still provide keys to the framework of the contemporary life script.

Berne made "script analysis...a central theme of his last book", subtitled The Psychology of Human Destiny, in which he explained that "one object of script analysis is to fit the patient's life plan into the grand historical psychology of the whole human race".

According to Berne, not only is there an individual script but there is also a family, community and national script. Ultimately there is a script for mankind which determines the fate of the human race.

Linking the script to the repetition compulsion, Berne concluded that "script analysis is then the answer to the problem of human destiny, and tells us that our fates are predetermined for the most part, and that free will in this respect is for most people an illusion".

== Later developments ==
"Many authors, after Berne's death, put forward the idea that scripts concern a general attitude to construct and organize reality...this 'open' frame of reference" linking script analysis to narrative psychology.

In such a perspective, "the main purpose of script analysis is to elicit the multiple meanings inherent in a person's life script".

Fanita English argued that the idea of scripts was associated perhaps too much with the idea of pathologies, whereas it is an episcript (a concept that she proposed) which is harmful. Eric Berne makes brief reference to it, calling it an overscript. English said that, "it is possible for a 'donor' to 'episcript' a 'vulnerable recipient' into taking on a harmful life task, such as murder or suicide. ... A tragic demonstration of the culmination of an episcript was offered on 9/11, when perfectly intelligent, educated young men attacked the World Trade Center Towers in New York at the cost of their own lives after having carefully planned to do so because they had been episcripted by Osama bin Laden".

== Criticism ==
Fanita English considered that "Berne tried too hard to turn script analysis into a science...devised far too technical a system for script analysis".

Others have remarked that "script analysis...is overly psychoanalytic in attitude and overly reductionist".

== See also ==
- Thomas Anthony Harris
- Claude Steiner
