= Deirdre English =

American journalist

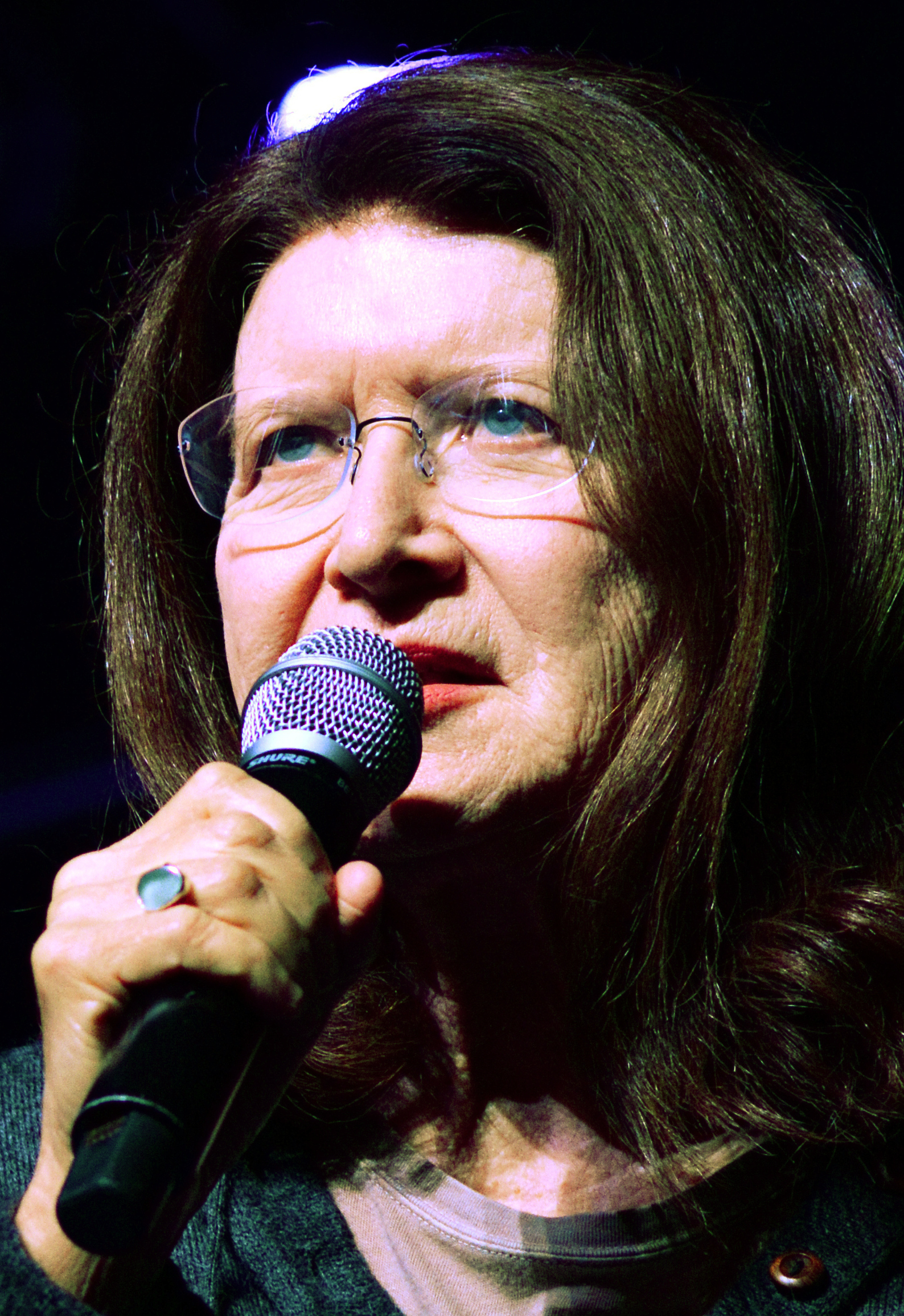
Deirdre English, 2023

Deirdre English (born 1948) is an American journalist who has written and edited work on a wide array of subjects related to investigative reporting, cultural politics, gender studies, and public policy. The former Editor-in-Chief of Mother Jones magazine (1978–1986), she was a continuing lecturer at the University of California-Berkeley School of Journalism from 2000 to 2024. She is the daughter of Fanita English and Maurice English.

Deirdre English was a co-founder of one of the first women’s studies programs in the US, and also taught American Studies and magazine feature writing, at the College of Old Westbury at the State University of New York. She has taught at City College of New York and the University of California, Santa Cruz. Her work includes For Her Own Good: Two Centuries of the Experts’s Advice to Women, co-authored with Barbara Ehrenreich and published with a new Afterword in 2004 (Anchor/Doubleday). Her work also includes Witches, Midwives and Nurses: A History of Women Healers, and Complaints and Disorders: the Sexual Politics of Sickness.

She has contributed articles, commentaries and reviews to Mother Jones magazine, The Nation, The New York Times Book Review, and Signs: A Feminist Journal, among other publications. Her essay on the work of photographer Susan Meiselas was published in Carnival Strippers, Whitney Museum of American Art, 2003. Her essay “The Fear that Feminism will Free Men First” has been anthologized in numerous collections, most recently in Women’s Liberation! Feminist Writings that Inspired a Revolution & Still Can, edited by Honor Moore and Alix Kates Shulman, Library of America, 2021.

In addition to teaching at Berkeley's Journalism school, English directed the Felker Magazine course for six years, during which time Brink Magazine, which she edited and produced with her students, won many awards and was twice named Best Student Magazine in the nation in the Mark of Excellence competition judged by the Society of Professional Journalists.

== Works ==
- Ehrenreich, Barbara; English, Deirdre (1971). Witches, Midwives, and Nurses: A History of Women Healers. Oyster Bay, N.Y.: Glass Mountain Pamphlets. OCLC 756025.
- Ehrenreich, Barbara; English, Deirdre (1973). Complaints and Disorders: The Sexual Politics of Sickness. Old Westbury, N.Y.: Feminist Press. ISBN 978-0-912670-20-1. OCLC 741018.
- Ehrenreich, Barbara; English, Deirdre (1978). For Her Own Good: 150 Years of the Experts' Advice to Women. Garden City, N.Y.: Anchor Press. OCLC 3893169.
