= Mind games =

Intellectual competition

Mind games (also power games or head games) are behaviors intended to influence an individual into performing a certain action, therefore giving the perpetrator the upper hand in a situation. The first known use of the term "mind game" dates from 1963, and "head game" from 1977.

== Conscious one-upmanship ==
In intimate relationships, mind games can be used to undermine one partner's belief in the validity of their own perceptions. Personal experience may be denied and driven from memory, and such abusive mind games may extend to the denial of the victim's reality, social undermining, and downplaying the importance of the other partner's concerns or perceptions. Both sexes have equal opportunities for such verbal coercion which may be carried out unconsciously as a result of the need to maintain one's own self-deception.

Office mind games are often hard to identify clearly, as strong management blurs with over-direction, and healthy rivalry with manipulative head games and sabotage. The wary salesman will be consciously and unconsciously prepared to meet a variety of challenging mind games and put-downs in the course of their work. The serious sportsman will also be prepared to meet a variety of gambits and head games from their rivals, attempting to tread the fine line between competitive psychology and paranoia.

== Unconscious games ==
Eric Berne described a psychological game as an organized series of ulterior transactions taking place on twin levels: social and psychological, and resulting in a dramatic outcome when the two levels finally came to coincide. He described the opening of a typical game like flirtation as follows: "Cowboy: 'Come and see the barn'. Visitor: 'I've loved barns ever since I was a little girl'". At the social level a conversation about barns, at the psychological level one about sex play, the outcome of the game – which may be comic or tragic, heavy or light – will become apparent when a switch takes place and the ulterior motives of each become clear.

Between thirty and forty such games (as well as variations of each) were described and tabulated in Berne's best seller on the subject titled "Games People Play: The Psychology of Human Relationships". According to one transactional analyst, "Games are so predominant and deep-rooted in society that they tend to become institutionalized, that is, played according to rules that everybody knows about and more or less agrees to. The game of Alcoholic, a five-handed game, illustrates this...so popular that social institutions have developed to bring the various players together" such as Alcoholics Anonymous and Al-anon.

Psychological games vary widely in degrees of consequence, ranging from first-degree games where losing involves embarrassment or frustration, to third-degree games where consequences are life-threatening. Berne recognized however that "since by definition games are based on ulterior transactions, they must all have some element of exploitation", and the therapeutic ideal he offered was to stop playing games altogether.

== See also ==
- Gossip
- Moving the goalposts
- Victim playing
