= The Radical Therapist =

Former psychotherapy journal

The Radical Therapist was a journal that emerged in the early 1970s in the context of the counter-culture and the radical U.S. antiwar movement. It was an "alternative journal" in the mental health field that published 12 issues between 1970 and 1972, and "voiced pointed criticisms of psychiatrists during this period". It was run by a group of psychiatrists and activists who believed that mental illness was best treated by social change, not behaviour modification. Their motto was "Therapy means social, political and personal change, not adjustment".

== Background ==
In the 1960s, a movement developed to challenge many principals of psychiatry and dispute the mental health system as a successful humanitarian enterprise. The challenge came from Ernest Becker, Erving Goffman, R.D. Laing, Thomas Scheff, and Thomas Szasz. Their writings, along with articles in the journal The Radical Therapist, were given the umbrella label anti-psychiatry despite wide divergences in philosophy. This critical literature, with an associated left-wing activist movement, "emphasized the hegemony of medical model psychiatry, its spurious sources of authority, its mystification of human problems, and the more oppressive practices of the mental health system, such as involuntary hospitalisation, drugging, and electroshock".

== Beginnings: Minot, North Dakota ==
The Radical Therapist took shape in the winter of 1969, in Minot, North Dakota, the product of three officers in the U.S. Air Force Regional Hospital. The idea for the journal came from Michael Glenn, a psychiatrist who had recently arrived as Chief of Neurology and Psychiatry. He was joined by David Bryan, the hospital social worker, and by Michael Galan, an MBA working in the hospital business office. The three of them further developed the idea, and—with Sara Glenn and Linda Bryan—formed the Radical Therapist Collective. The Collective solicited articles, contributing editors and subscriptions, and worked to produce and distribute the journal. After a year, they were joined by Deborah Levitt, from Bennington, Vermont, who had traveled cross-country to work with them. Their manifesto stated:

Why have we begun another journal? No other publication meets the need we feel exists: to unite all people concerned with the radical analysis of therapy in this society. It is time we grouped together and made common cause. We need to exchange experience and ideas, and join others working toward change. The other "professional" journals are essentially establishment organs which back the status quo on most controversial issues... We need a new forum for our views.

In the midst of a society tormented by war, racism, and social turmoil, therapy goes on with business as usual. In fact, therapists often look suspiciously at social change and label as 'disturbed' those who press towards it.

Therapy today has become a commodity, a means of social control. We reject such an approach to people's distress. We reject the pleasant careers with which the system rewards its adherents. The social system must change, and we will be workers toward such change.

The Manifesto promised that the journal would provide a needed forum for all people working in the therapy fields; work to liberate therapy, therapists and others from backwards ideology; help develop new training programs; encourage the elaboration of a new psychology of men and women, as well as a new concept of family and community life; foster the development of more responsive therapy programs under client control; encourage new techniques; and confront the various ways U.S. society uses mental health institutions to oppress various people.

The journal was highly critical of the "Establishment" and all its institutions. In this sense, The Radical Therapist was similar to The Insurgent Sociologist, Science for the People, Radical Teacher, and other publications that targeted various groups of professionals whose political spectrum included left-leaning, radical, and revolutionary-minded activists.

During its time in Minot, the journal was typeset and published locally, and mailed out via a collective effort. The journal printed articles critiquing the therapy "establishment" and its practice and outlining a "radical" approach to the ways therapy could be used instead. It enthusiastically promoted women's liberation and gay liberation, and critically examined how therapy ideology and practice were alleged to contribute to sexist and homophobic oppression, and to the oppression and abuse of mental patients. The Radical Therapist also spoke out against the Vietnam War, racism, and the greed of consumerist society, and it was an early supporter of the struggle of mental patients for their rights.

Contributing editors and authors while the RT was in Minot included Joe Berke, Judith Brown, Phil Brown, Phyllis Chesler, Larry Constantine, Rona Fields, Dennis Jaffe, Kenneth Keniston, David Koulack, Rick Kunnes, Terry Kupers, Howard Levy, Robert Jay Lifton, Ken Locke, Peter Roemer, Kris Rosenthal, Steve Sharfstein, Pam Skinner, Claude Steiner, Irving Weisberg, Steve Wood and others. Early issues of The Radical Therapist also reprinted and made more widely available articles such as Anne Koedt's "The Myth of the Vaginal Orgasm", Carol Hanish's "The Personal is Political", and Howard Levy's "Prison Psychiatry".

The third issue of the RT focused entirely on women. It examined both women's oppression and women's psychology. The issue began with an editorial by the feminist Judith Brown, and followed with the Redstockings' "Manifesto"; a critique of male supremacy, private property and the family by Carol Giardina; and a reprint of Naomi Weisstein's "Kinder, Kuche Kirche". There were also articles by Kathie Sarachild, Phyllis Chesler, Marilyn Zweig, Martha Shelley, and others, as well as a Women's Liberation bibliography.

During its first year, The Radical Therapist worked collegially with many other groups, including Psychologists for a Democratic Society, the Radical Caucus of the American Psychiatric Association, the Radical Caucus in the American Orthopsychiatry Association, the Association for Women in Psychology, the Feminist Psychology Coalition, the Medical Committee for Human Rights, Psychologists for Social Action, Joe Berke's Anti-Psychiatry group in London, Claude Steiner's "Radical Psychiatry" movement in Berkeley, Dennis and Yvonne Jaffe's Number Nine in New Haven, and other radical groups in the therapy and health professions. It reported on developments affecting mental health issues around the country, and published a list of radical therapy centers around the country.

Many of the articles which appeared during the first year of the RT were collected together in The Radical Therapist, (Ballantine Books, New York, 1971), an anthology gathered together by the collective and produced by Jerome Agel.

Volume Two of The Radical Therapist began in Minot in April 1971. But the collective only published that one issue (Number 1) of Volume Two from Minot. That summer, after David Bryan, Michael Galan, and Michael Glenn were discharged from the Air Force, the collective moved from North Dakota to Somerville, Massachusetts. Volume Two, Number 2 which appeared in September 1971, would be the product of a substantially different collective.

== The Somerville Years: The Radical Therapist becomes Rough Times ==
The new Radical Therapist Collective that formed in Somerville in the late summer of 1971 included Michael Glenn, Sara Snow (Glenn) and Debbie Levitt from the Minot group, as well as Michael Galan, who continued to handle the business aspects of the journal. Phil Brown, who had been active in Psychologists for a Democratic Society, and who had enthusiastically worked with the journal since its inception, moved from New York to join the collective that summer; so did Nancy Henley, an activist feminist psychologist from Baltimore. Other new members joined the Somerville collective over the next few months. These included the therapists John Bayliss, Cynthia Ganung, and Chuck Robinson; as well as Anne Mine, Christine Nozchese and Laurin Pensel. After publishing the first Somerville issue (Volume Two, Number 2) the third issue was entirely devoted to articles from the Radical Psychiatry movement in Berkeley, California—including a number of articles by Claude Steiner, Hogie Wyckoff, and Dot Vance.

By the winter of 1971, sharp political struggle had broken out in the collective over issues of elitism and professionalism. Some members raised questions as to whether therapists really had any skills at all, and whether the field had simply mystified its practices. There were also questions as to the journal's real audience. The use of the words "radical" and "therapist" were heatedly debated; many in the collective held them to be suspect. The struggle spilled onto the pages of the journal itself. Therapists who were deeply critical of their own therapy "establishment" now found themselves having to defend therapy as a bona fide discipline—and themselves as "privileged" individuals. Contention among the collective about the journal's name, and by implication its base and audience, deepened. Some members of the collective felt that the original focus on therapy professionals had been both limited and elitist, and the more revolutionary-minded staff members urged the journal to go beyond the therapy world and expand its support to all bona fide liberation movements. More and more, the collective simply called the journal the RT. Soon after arriving in Somerville, the collective established close ties with the mental patients' rights movement, including the Mental Patients Liberation Front in Boston and many others throughout North America. The RT quickly began publishing articles by its leaders, which were sharply critical of the therapy profession as a whole for tolerating and participating in a wide range of abusive psychiatric practices.

With the April 1972 issue (Volume Two, number 6), the collective changed the journal's name to Rough Times, and stopped being a publication aimed predominantly at mental health professionals. As Nancy Henley recalled in 1980, "Many of us (and our readers) disliked the original name when it became clear that this might be a contradiction in terms, there was much more to combat than therapeutic practice; radical had bad connotations for some, therapist did for others, [and] the magazine wasn't necessarily by or for therapists...."

By July 1972 (Volume Two, Number 8), almost all the members of the Somerville collective with any clinical therapy experience (or an identity as "therapists") had left. From this point on, the journal's articles were mainly written by and for people who were not therapists.

In December 1972, the RT Collective published an article, "Combat Liberalism in Radical Therapy", formally criticizing the Radical Psychiatry Center group in Berkeley. The article was sparked by the RPC's efforts to promote its own new journal to the RT's readers and by genuine political differences. The RT said it had relayed criticisms to the RPC in private, but they had been ignored. The criticisms therefore had to be made publicly. The RT decried the RPC as individualistic and middle-class. It said the RPC avoided political action or organizing, and instead clung to their elite status as therapists. "Hip therapies are part of the system", the Collective said. The RPC was too concerned with ways of "getting it together" and elaborating "how to do it" techniques, rather than "attacking the real political/economic/social bases of power." They also ignored mental patients' organizing as a major force in the mental health arena.

The RPC did not respond, but instead continued to promote its own journal, Issues in Radical Therapy. After this time, the IRT contained articles that were concerned with "radical therapy", whereas Rough Times focussed on exposing the abuses and oppressive institutional practices of the mental health profession, as well as on promoting liberation struggles in the U.S. and around the world, especially the movement of mental patients to defend and claim their rights.

In the second collection of articles from the RT that appeared (Rough Times, Ballantine Books, 1973—also produced by Jerome Agel), the new collective clarified its ideological perspective further:

A year ago we were fewer in number and tucked away in North Dakota. Although we had different positions on RT's role in making a revolution, there was a de facto consensus of aiming our work toward professionals, students, and intellectuals, believing that they held the key to radical work in the mental health fields. We have been finding, primarily in the last half year, that while some of those people are open to change, most of them are too comfortable in their professionally detached attitudes, pseudo-hip life-styles, and removed position from world revolution as well as personal change. We began to see our position in terms of being part of a revolutionary movement. Our goals were more linked to a broad-based socialist movement than to a radical caucus at a professional convention. We began to reassert, with more force and conviction, that RT should be part of a movement to build a revolutionary new world.

== The new direction continues: Rough Times which later became State and Mind ==
By the time Volume Three, Number 1 of Rough Times formerly The Radical Therapist came out in December 1972, the collective had contracted down to a few people. An "RT Position Paper" laid out the staff's evolved position: support for worldwide socialist revolution; belief in the exploitation of labor as today's primary cause of people's oppression; support for all just liberation struggles; deep involvement in and support for the mental health/self-help struggle; belief that the psychological/psychiatric establishment per se is a tool of oppression and that mental illness is a myth; demands for an end to abuses of mental patients; dedication to a search for new, liberating ways of helping people in emotional pain; and at the same time an openness to working with therapy professionals who could identify with the interests of the people.

Rough Times continued on for several more years, continuing to contain sections such as "Unmasking the Enemy", "Mental Hospitals", and "On the Move". It reported on the struggles of mental patients for their rights and against all forms of abusive treatment. And it continued to support movements for liberation—for women, gays, mental patients, and others—around the world.

Around 1975 Rough Times changed its name to State and Mind. As such, it continued into the 1980s. Its 10th anniversary issue in the summer of 1980 contained a personal retrospective article by Nancy Henley entitled "Ten Years in the Life of a Radical Psychology Journal".

In 1974, the psychiatrist John Talbott published an article critical of The Radical Therapist in the American Journal of Psychiatry. The piece reviewed articles published in the first twelve issues, and included commentary by Dr. Talbott.

== See also ==
- List of psychiatry journals
