= Destabilisation =

Attempts to undermine political, military or economic power

The word destabilisation (alternatively, destabilization) can be applied to a wide variety of contexts such as attempts to undermine political, military or economic power.

== Psychology ==
In a psychological context, it is used as a technique in brainwashing and abuse to disorient and disarm the victim.

In the context of workplace bullying, destabilisation applied to the victim may involve:

- failure to acknowledge good work and value the victim's efforts
- allocation of meaningless tasks
- removal of areas of responsibility without consultation
- repeated reminders of blunders
- setting up to fail
- shifting of goal posts without telling the victim
- persistent attempts to demoralise the victim

Destabilisation could also denote the extreme end of disinhibition syndrome and entail the complete shutdown of an individual's control of emotions, inhibitions, and productive functioning. The condition can be episodic or it could last for months or years, requiring professional care from a practitioner who is familiar with the individual's primary neurological disorder.

In psychology, there is also a process called cognitive destabilisation, which involves being open to conversions and transformations of various kinds. This could be used to counter political destabilisation by presenting a consensual view of the problem.

== Other applications ==
Destabilisation is also used in the feminist context such as the way it is used to change the binary opposition between men and women, particularly how it gives the category 'woman' its meaning. For instance, this is expressed in many feminists' discomfort concerning postmodern theories' challenge to traditional binary oppositions, perceiving it as a subversion of women's attempt to define their own subjecthood. The body of literature on feminism also often invoke the need to destabilise modern theory, particularly the theoretical discourses that claim neutrality but are established from a masculine perspective. These attempts to destabilise modern female constructs have been informed by Jacques Derrida's deconstruction theory, particularly the destabilisation of positions and subjects that have been deemed holistic or authoritative.

In literature, a conceptualization refers to it as an aggression or a kind of attack on the reader to provoke discomfort. In international capital transactions, it is used to denote as a capital movement driven by erroneous forecast, driving the exchange rate away from equilibrium that would be supported by rational speculators whose foresight are correct.

== See also ==
- Abusive power and control – Aspect of personal relationships
- Cognitive distortion – Exaggerated or irrational thought pattern
- Dehumanization – Behavior or process that undermines individuality of and in others
- Demoralization (warfare) – Warfare tactic used to erode morale
- Discrediting tactic – Effort to damage someone's reputation
- Divide and rule – Strategy in politics and sociology
- Economic terrorism
- Gaslighting – Type of psychological manipulation
- Guilt trip – Form of psychological manipulation
- Isolation to facilitate abuse – Abuse tactic
- Mental confusion – State of being bewildered or unclear in one's mind about something
- Mind games – Intellectual competition
- Passive–aggressive behavior – Indirect resistance to the demands of others
- Personal boundaries – An individual's asserted personal values
- Playing one person against another – Theory related to Murray Bowen
- Positive disintegration – Theory of personality development
- Psychological abuse – Mental or emotional harm inflicted on a person
- Silent treatment – Refusal to communicate verbally with someone who desires the communication
- Social undermining – Type of anti-social behavior
- Stabilizer – Process to prevent shock in injured people
- Strategy of tension – Political policy encouraging violent struggle
- Subversion – Attempt to transform the established social order and its structures
- Thesis, antithesis, synthesis – Method of reasoning via argumentation and contradiction
- Triangulation (psychology) – Theory related to Murray Bowen
