= Karpman drama triangle =

Model of human interaction proposed in 1968

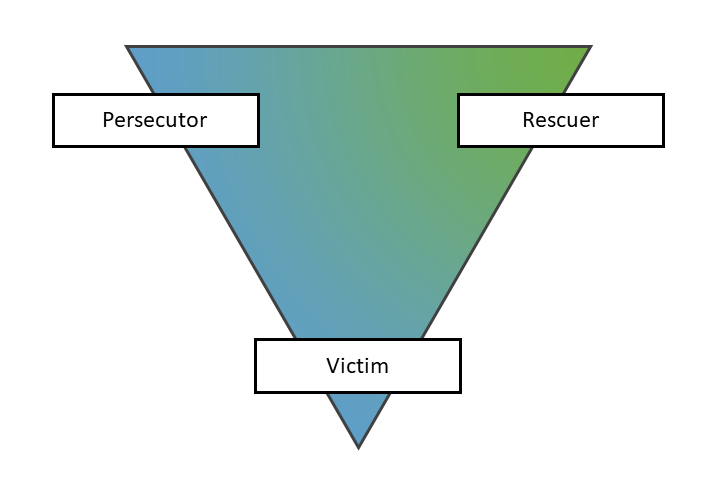
Drama triangle proposed by the psychiatrist Stephen B. Karpman

The Karpman drama triangle is a social model of human interaction proposed by San Francisco psychiatrist Stephen B. Karpman in 1968. The triangle maps a type of destructive interaction that can occur among people in conflict. The drama triangle model is a tool used in psychotherapy, specifically transactional analysis. The triangle of actors in the drama are persecutors, victims, and rescuers.

Karpman described how in some cases these roles were not undertaken in an honest manner to resolve the presenting problem, but rather were used fluidly and switched between by the actors in a way that achieved unconscious goals and agendas. The outcome in such cases was that the actors would be left feeling justified and entrenched, but there would often be little or no change to the presenting problem, and other more fundamental problems giving rise to the situation remaining unaddressed.

== Use ==
Through popular usage, and the work of Stephen Karpman and others, Karpman's triangle has been adapted for use in structural analysis and transactional analysis.

== Theory ==
Karpman used triangles to map conflicted or drama-intense relationship transactions. The Karpman Drama Triangle models the connection between personal responsibility and power in conflicts, and the destructive and shifting roles people play. He defined three roles in the conflict; Persecutor, Rescuer (the one up positions) and Victim (one down position). Karpman placed these three roles on an inverted triangle and referred to them as being the three aspects, or faces of drama.

1. The Victim: The Victim in this model is not intended to represent an actual victim, but rather someone feeling or acting like one. The Victim seeks to convince him or herself and others that he or she cannot do anything, nothing can be done, all attempts are futile, despite trying hard. One payoff for this stance is avoiding real change or acknowledgement of one's true feelings, which may bring anxiety and risk, while feeling one is doing all one can to escape it. As such, the Victim's stance is "Poor me!" The Victim feels persecuted, oppressed, helpless, hopeless, powerless, ashamed, and seems unable to make decisions, solve problems, take pleasure in life or achieve insight. The Victim will remain with a Persecutor or, if not being persecuted, will set someone else up in the role of Persecutor. The Victim will also seek help, creating one or more Rescuers to save the day, who will in reality perpetuate the Victim's negative feelings and leave the situation broadly unchanged.
2. The Rescuer: The Rescuer's line is "Let me help you." A classic enabler, the Rescuer feels guilty if they do not go to the rescue, and ultimately becomes angry (and becomes a Persecutor) as their help fails to achieve change. Yet the Rescuer's rescuing has negative effects: it keeps the Victim dependent and doesn't allow the Victim permission to fail and experience the consequences of their choices. The rewards derived from this rescue role are that the focus is taken away from the Rescuer, who can also feel good for having tried, and justified in their negative feelings (to the other actor/s) upon failing. When one focuses one's energy on another, it enables one to ignore one's own anxiety and troubles. This rescue role is also pivotal because one's actual primary interest is really an avoidance of one's own problems disguised as concern for the Victim's needs.
3. The Persecutor: (a.k.a. Villain) The Persecutor insists, "It's all your fault." The Persecutor is controlling, blaming, critical, oppressive, angry, authoritarian, rigid and superior. But if blamed in turn, the Persecutor may become defensive and may switch roles to become a Victim if attacked forcefully by the Rescuer and/or Victim, in which case the Victim may also switch roles to become a Persecutor.

Initially a drama triangle arises when a person takes on the role of a victim or persecutor. This person then feels the need to enlist other players into the conflict. As often happens, a rescuer is encouraged to enter the situation. These enlisted players take on roles of their own that are not static, and therefore various scenarios can occur. The victim might turn on the rescuer, for example, while the rescuer then switches to persecution.

The reason that the situation persists is that each participant has their (frequently unconscious) psychological wishes/needs met without having to acknowledge the broader dysfunction or harm done in the situation as a whole. Each participant is acting upon their own selfish needs, rather than acting in a genuinely responsible or altruistic manner. Any character might "ordinarily come on like a plaintive victim; it is now clear that the one can switch into the role of Persecutor providing it is 'accidental' and the one apologizes for it".

The motivations of the rescuer are the least obvious. In the terms of the triangle, the rescuer has a mixed or covert motive and benefits egoically in some way from being "the one who rescues". The rescuer has a surface motive of resolving the problem and appears to make great efforts to solve it, but also has a hidden motive to not succeed, or to succeed in a way in which he or she benefits. The rescuer may get a self-esteem boost, for example, or receive respected rescue status, or derive enjoyment by having someone depend on or trust him or her and act in a way that ostensibly seems to be trying to help, but at a deeper level plays upon the victim in order to continue getting a payoff.

The relationship between the victim and the rescuer may be one of codependency. The rescuer keeps the victim dependent by encouraging their victimhood. The victim gets their needs met by being taken care of by the rescuer.

Participants generally tend to have a primary or habitual role (victim, rescuer, persecutor) when they enter into drama triangles. Participants first learn their habitual roles in their respective families of origin. Even though participants each have a role with which they most identify, once on the triangle, participants rotate through all the three positions.

Each triangle has a "payoff" for those playing it. The "antithesis" of a drama triangle lies in discovering how to deprive the actors of their payoff.

== Historical context ==
=== Family therapy movement ===
Main article: Family therapy

Though various forms of both formal and informal familial interventions led by particular members in the community have spanned across cultures and history, "family therapy as a distinct professional practice within Western cultures... originated in the social work movements of the 19th century in the United Kingdom and the United States. As a branch of psychotherapy, its roots can be traced somewhat later to the early 20th century with the emergence of the child guidance movement and marriage counseling." Prior to this time, physicians focused on the patient's already-developed psyche and downplayed outside detractors. Intrinsic factors were addressed and extrinsic reactions were considered as emanating from forces within the person.

After working with Sigmund Freud (who many consider to be the "father of psychotherapy") for just under a decade, personal and ideological differences led Alfred Adler and his supporters to split from Freud's psychoanalytic approach and form a related but different approach to psychology and psychotherapy in 1912: Individual Psychology. Though briefly disrupted by World War I, the post-war political and social climate in Austria provided fertile ground for Adler's socialist agenda to thrive in Austria and across Europe. With the Austrian government's cooperation, Adler founded the world's first Child Guidance clinic in 1919, which provided schoolchildren with free educational therapy and involved family and teachers.

Around the same time, "Ethel Dummer... a volunteer at Hull House, a member of the Board of the Juvenile Protective Association, and a frequent visitor to Cook County Juvenile Court... funded the study and treatment of delinquency for 5 years. Mrs Dummer’s philanthropy led to the founding of the Juvenile Psychopathic Institute in 1909." Later renamed the Institute for Juvenile Research in 1920, "the Juvenile Psychopathic Institute became the first child guidance clinic [in America] and the model for all subsequent [American] child guidance clinics."

Following World War I, marriage counseling emerged at a similar time as the child guidance movement as a result of divorce rates, feminism, and eugenics became more popular across the western world. The first documented marriage clinics were founded in Germany 1924 at Magnus Hirschfeld's Institut für Sexualwissenschaft (Institute of Sexual Science) and by Helene Stöcker's Bund für Mutterschutz (League for the Protection of Motherhood). Inspired by Germany's eugentic-focused marriage counseling centers, Paul Popenoe further fueled the eugentics movement in America by founding the American Institue for Family Relations in 1930. Soon after, Abraham and Hannah Stone established the first American marriage counseling center in 1931.

After World War II, therapists all across the world observed that while many battle-torn veteran patients readjusted well after returning to their families, some patients did not; some even regressed when they returned to their home environment. Researchers felt that they needed an explanation for this and began to explore the dynamics of family life – and thus began the family therapy movement.

=== Transactions analysis ===
In the 1950s, Eric Berne developed transactional analysis, a method for studying interactions between individuals. This approach was profoundly different from that of Freud. While Freud relied on asking patients about themselves, Berne felt that a therapist could learn by observing what was communicated (words, body language, facial expressions) in a transaction. So instead of directly asking the patient questions, Berne would frequently observe the patient in a group setting, noting all of the transactions that occurred between the patient and other individuals.

=== Triangles/triangulation ===
The theory of triangulation was originally published in 1966 by Murray Bowen as one of eight parts of Bowen's family systems theory. Murray Bowen, a pioneer in family systems theory, began his early work with schizophrenics at the Menninger Clinic, from 1946 to 1954. Triangulation is the "process whereby a two-party relationship that is experiencing tension will naturally involve third parties to reduce tension". Simply put, when people find themselves in conflict with another person, they will reach out to a third person. The resulting triangle is more comfortable, as it can hold much more tension, because the tension is being shifted around three people instead of two.

Bowen studied the dyad of the mother and her schizophrenic child while he had them both living in a research unit at the Menninger clinic. Bowen then moved to the National Institute of Mental Health (NIMH), where he resided from 1954 to 1959. At the NIMH Bowen extended his hypothesis to include the father-mother-child triad. Bowen considered differentiation and triangles the crux of his theory, Bowen Family Systems Theory. Bowen intentionally used the word triangle rather than triad. In Bowen Family Systems Theory, the triangle is an essential part of the relationship.

Couples left to their own resources oscillate between closeness and distance. Two people having this imbalance often have difficulty resolving it by themselves. To stabilize the relationship, the couple often seek the aid of a third party to help re-establish closeness. A triangle is the smallest possible relationship system that can restore balance in a time of stress. The third person assumes an outside position. In periods of stress, the outside position is the most comfortable and desired position. The inside position is plagued by anxiety, along with its emotional closeness. The outsider serves to preserve the inside couple's relationship. Bowen noted that not all triangles are constructive – some are destructive.

=== Pathological/perverse triangles ===
In 1968, Nathan Ackerman conceptualized a destructive triangle. Ackerman stated "we observe certain constellations of family interactions which we have epitomized as the pattern of family interdependence, roles those of destroyer or persecutor, the victim of the scapegoating attack, and the family healer or the family doctor." Ackerman also recognized the pattern of attack, defense, and counterattack, as shifting roles.

=== Karpman triangle and Eric Berne ===
In 1968, Stephen Karpman, who had an interest in acting and was a member of the Screen Actors Guild, chose "drama triangle" rather than "conflict triangle" as, here, the Victim in his model is not intended to represent an actual victim, but rather someone feeling or acting like one. He first published his theory in an article entitled "Fairy Tales and Script Drama Analysis". His article, in part, examined the fairy tale "Little Red Riding Hood" to illustrate its points. Karpman was, at the time, a recent graduate of Duke University School of Medicine and was doing post post-graduate studies under Berne. Berne, who founded the field of transactional analysis, encouraged Karpman to publish what Berne referred to as "Karpman's triangle". Karpman's article was published in 1968. In 1972, Karpman received the Eric Berne Memorial Scientific Award for the work.

== Transactional analysis ==
Eric Berne, a Canadian-born psychiatrist, created the theory of transactional analysis, in the middle of the 20th century, as a way of explaining human behavior. Berne's theory of transactional analysis was based on the ideas of Freud but was distinctly different. Freudian psychotherapists focused on talk therapy as a way of gaining insight to their patients' personalities. Berne believed that insight could be better discovered by analyzing patients' social transactions.

Games in transactional analysis refers to a series of transactions that is complementary (reciprocal), ulterior, and proceeds towards a predictable outcome. In this context, the Karpman Drama Triangle is a "game".

Games are often characterized by a switch in roles of players towards the end. The number of players may vary. Games in this sense are devices used (often unconsciously) by people to create a circumstance where they can justifiably feel certain resulting feelings (such as anger or superiority) or justifiably take or avoid taking certain actions where their own inner wishes differ from societal expectations. They are always a substitute for a more genuine and full adult emotion and response which would be more appropriate. Three quantitative variables are often useful to consider for games:

Flexibility: "The ability of the players to change the currency of the game (that is, the tools they use to play it). 'Some games...can be played properly with only one kind of currency, while others, such as exhibitionistic games, are more flexible", so that the focus of power may shift from words, to money, to parts of the body.
Tenacity: "Some people give up their games easily, others are more persistent", referring to the way people stick to their games and their resistance to breaking away from them.
Intensity: "Some people play their games in a relaxed way, others are more tense and aggressive. Games so played are known as easy and hard games, respectively".

The consequences of games may vary from small paybacks to paybacks built up over a long period to a major level. Based on the degree of acceptability and potential harm, games are classified into three categories, representing first degree games, second degree games, and third degree games:

- socially acceptable,
- undesirable but not irreversibly damaging
- may result in drastic harm.

The Karpman triangle was an adaptation of a model that was originally conceived to analyze the play-action pass and the draw play in American football and later adapted as a way to analyze movie scripts. Karpman is reported to have doodled thirty or more diagram types before settling on the triangle. Karpman credits the movie Valley of the Dolls as being a testbed for refining the model into what Berne coined as the Karpman Drama Triangle.

Karpman now has many variables of the Karpman triangle in his fully developed theory, besides role switches. These include space switches (private-public, open-closed, near-far) which precede, cause, or follow role switches, and script velocity (number of role switches in a given unit of time). These include the Question Mark triangle, False Perception triangle, Double Bind triangle, The Indecision triangle, the Vicious Cycle triangle, Trapping triangle, Escape triangle, Triangles of Oppression, and Triangles of Liberation, Switching in the triangle, and the Alcoholic Family triangle.

While transactional analysis is the method for studying interactions between individuals, one researcher postulates that drama-based leaders can instill an organizational culture of drama. Persecutors are more likely to be in leadership positions and a persecutor culture goes hand in hand with cutthroat competition, fear, blaming, manipulation, high turnover and an increased risk of lawsuits. There are also victim cultures which can lead to low morale and low engagement as well as an avoidance of conflict, and rescuer cultures which can be characterized as having a high dependence on the leader, low initiative and low innovation.

== Therapeutic models ==
The Winner's Triangle was published by Acey Choy in 1990 as a therapeutic model for showing patients how to alter social transactions when entering a triangle at any of the three entry points. Choy recommends that anyone feeling like a victim think more in terms of being vulnerable and caring, that anyone cast as a persecutor adopt an assertive posture, and anyone recruited to be a rescuer should react by being "caring".

- Vulnerable – a victim should be encouraged to accept their vulnerability, problem solve, and be more self-aware.
- Assertive – a persecutor should be encouraged to ask for what they want, be assertive, and cultivate self-compassion.
- Caring – a rescuer should be encouraged to show concern and be caring, but not over-reach and problem solve for others.

The Power of TED*, first published in 2009, recommends that the "victim" adopt the alternative role of creator, view the persecutor as a challenger, and enlist a coach instead of a rescuer.

- Creator – victims are encouraged to be outcome-oriented as opposed to problem-oriented and take responsibility for choosing their response to life challenges. They should focus on resolving "dynamic tension" (the difference between current reality and the envisioned goal or outcome) by taking incremental steps toward the outcomes they are trying to achieve.
- Challenger – a victim is encouraged to see a persecutor as a person (or situation) that forces the creator to clarify their needs, and focus on their learning and growth.
- Coach – a rescuer should be encouraged to ask questions that are intended to help the individual to make informed choices. The key difference between a rescuer and a coach is that the coach sees the creator as capable of making choices and of solving their own problems. A coach asks questions that enable the creator to see the possibilities for positive action, and to focus on what they do want instead of what they don't want.

== See also ==
- DARVO – Acronym for a common strategy of abusers
- Family estrangement – Loss of relationship between family members
- Script analysis – Transactional analysis method
- Triangulation (psychology) – Theory related to Murray Bowen
- Victim playing – Fabrication or exaggeration of victimhood
