= DARVO =

Acronym for a common strategy of abusers

DARVO (an acronym for "Deny, Attack, Reverse Victim and Offender") is a reaction that perpetrators of wrongdoing, such as abusers or sexual offenders, may display in response to being held accountable for their behavior. Research indicates that it is a common manipulation strategy of psychological abusers

== Process ==
DARVO is a tactic used by a perpetrator to avoid accountability for their actions. As the acronym suggests, DARVO commonly involves these steps:

1. The perpetrator denies the harm or abuse ever took place.
2. When confronted with evidence, the perpetrator then attacks the person that they had harmed, or are still harming. The attacker may also attack the victim's family or friends.
3. Finally, the perpetrator claims that they were or are actually the victim in the situation, thus reversing the positions of victim and offender. It often involves not just playing the victim but also victim blaming.

These tactics are similar to other techniques used by perpetrators to avoid accountability by manipulating observers' perceptions of events. Researchers have noted similarities to outrage management, where a perpetrator tries to make observers think better of themself and their actions so they can avoid consequences. This strategy often involves denying the victim's version of events and trying to make observers doubt the victim's credibility, which are both key aspects of DARVO. Relevant techniques also include playing the victim and playing the hero, which perpetrators use to downplay the harm seen in their behavior. In playing the victim, a perpetrator highlights their own past suffering to attempt to be seen as a victim as well, and in playing the hero, a perpetrator admits to some amount of wrongdoing but highlights their own past good deeds to mitigate their harmful ones. Both techniques may come into play for the denying or reversing stages of DARVO.

== Origins ==
The acronym and theory behind DARVO is based on the work of psychologist Jennifer Freyd, who wrote about it in 1997. The first stage of DARVO, denial, involves gaslighting. Freyd writes:

... I have observed that actual abusers threaten, bully and make a nightmare for anyone who holds them accountable or asks them to change their abusive behavior. This attack, intended to chill and terrify, typically includes threats of law suits, overt and covert attacks on the whistle-blower's credibility, and so on. The attack will often take the form of focusing on ridiculing the person who attempts to hold the offender accountable. [...] The offender rapidly creates the impression that the abuser is the wronged one, while the victim or concerned observer is the offender. Figure and ground are completely reversed. [...] The offender is on the offense and the person attempting to hold the offender accountable is put on the defense.

Research on interpersonal violence has mostly focused on how perpetrators use individual components or steps of DARVO, rather than studying them in combination. However, studies before and after DARVO was coined found a correlation between perpetrators who minimized or denied their wrongdoing and those who reversed the positions of victim and offender. Research during the 2010s began to focus on the use and effect of DARVO tactics in combination, suggesting that DARVO is a common tactic used by perpetrators.

== Usage ==
Studies on the prevalence of DARVO suggest it is a common tactic used by perpetrators when they are confronted over their behavior, regardless of the type of harm they have caused. One study of undergraduates who had confronted someone over a harmful event found that DARVO was used by 72% of the perpetrators during the confrontation. The offenses ranged from social mistreatment, like betrayed secrets, to interpersonal violence, like sexual assault or child abuse. DARVO is particularly likely in cases of sexual violence, with one study of women who had been sexually assaulted at university reporting that half of the perpetrators involved had used elements of DARVO in later conversations.

DARVO has been studied and documented in specific contexts beyond those of interpersonal violence. DARVO has been labeled in some cases of medical malpractice, where victim blaming is already common since doctors and hospitals generally refuse to admit their mistakes due to legal risk. DARVO has also been cited as common in workplace bullying and toxic workplace culture. When professors try to report bullying in academia, DARVO tactics often compel them to stop speaking up, adding to their trauma and contributing to a culture of silence.

In this vein, DARVO has been theorized as acting on groups of people and not just individuals. One case under study was the intense backlash to the MeToo movement, where men's rights activists said some MeToo allegations were false and launched a HimToo movement. Other researchers say DARVO can happen at even wider societal levels, labeling it as DARVO when media organizations promote rape myths in efforts to discredit sexual assault victims. Researchers have also drawn parallels between individual DARVO tactics and the tendency for dominant cultural groups to stigmatize and blame groups who are speaking up about their trauma.

== Effectiveness ==
DARVO tactics are more successful when abusers can take advantage of societal beliefs and stereotypes to convince their audience of their new narrative. In the case of sexual violence, assailants sometimes victim-blame by appealing to societal opinions on gender roles and power dynamics. Stereotypes can help perpetrators: if an assailant is a wealthy white man, he may be perceived as authoritative and sincere, whereas if an accusation against him was made by a journalist, they might be seen as predatory and thus less trustworthy. Stereotypes can also limit the effectiveness or opportunity for DARVO tactics: one example is how the ethnic stereotype of black men as dangerous predators makes it more difficult for assailants who are black men to employ DARVO. Similarly, gender stereotypes about sexual violence help explain why DARVO in assault cases grows more effective where a woman has assaulted a man, rather than vice versa.

DARVO is able to move perceptions of responsibility and blame from attackers to victims, when studied in cases of sexual abuse. One study found that DARVO made observers see perpetrators as less responsible for a described case of abuse and less abusive in general, than in cases where DARVO was not used. Victims were likewise seen as more responsible for the abuse against them, and more abusive. The study also found that DARVO reduces the believability of victims and perpetrators when it is used. Even though both sides are seen as less credible by observers, this still hurts victims more: they often need to meet a high standard of credibility to be taken seriously or to successfully report or litigate cases of sexual violence.

Knowledge of DARVO makes observers less likely to be manipulated by it. In the previous study, the negative effects of DARVO were lessened for observers who had previously learned about how DARVO works. This made observers less likely to blame the victim or decide the victim should be punished, and more likely to agree that the perpetrator should be punished.

=== Vulnerable settings ===
DARVO is a particular concern in legal contexts and institutional reporting systems, because perpetrators engaging in DARVO tactics frequently use these systems against their victims. Judicial systems often treat alleged perpetrators and victims neutrally during investigations, so an alleged perpetrator and victim have similar legal processes and may have the same access to supportive or protective measures.

In American universities, where Title IX offices often handle investigations of sexual assault and harassment, limited protective measures are available before a full investigation is completed. Assailants engaging in DARVO use these protective measures against their victims, taking advantage of the neutral policies of the office and the attempts of administrators to support the rights of both the accuser and accused.

DARVO manifests in the legal system when assailants file lawsuits against their victims, and these commonly take the form of defamation or libel cases where assailants accuse their accusers of trying to hurt their reputations. Legal DARVO tactics had been growing more common as of 2022. After this rise, many U.S. states passed anti-SLAPP laws to help victims dismiss certain DARVO-based defamation lawsuits. Anti-SLAPP measures help in cases where a perpetrator's lawsuit would obviously fail and was just brought forward to increase public and financial pressure on the victim.

== Motivations and beliefs ==
Researchers have examined how the beliefs of abusive partners match what is claimed in DARVO tactics, where perpetrators deny abuse happened and blame the victim for being the aggressor. In one study concerning intimate partner violence among college students, researchers asked students to fill out private surveys that measured internalized beliefs about their relationships and allowed students to self-report intimate partner violence they had committed. Researchers found a strong correlation between students of all genders who had previously abused their partners and the belief that relationship difficulties were their partner's fault, and not their own. For male respondents, avoiding the discussion of relationship difficulties was also strongly correlated with the likelihood of past abuse. Other research has found that violent men are more likely than nonviolent men to believe their partners are critical and intentionally malicious. Studies of abusive men have also found that they frequently minimize or fully deny that incidents of abuse happened, and that this behavior is most common when the abusers fear legal issues or other situational consequences.

Because of DARVO's prevalence in cases of sexual harassment and violence, one study examined how someone's belief in rape myths intersected with their likelihood to use DARVO. The study measured participant's use of DARVO in reaction to the worst wrong they had ever been accused of committing, and found that DARVO reactions to any type of wrongdoing were correlated with greater acceptance of rape myths and likelihood of perpetrating sexual harassment. The authors propose a few potential explanations: people who use DARVO may be more accepting of victim blaming, people who minimize violence may minimize their own wrongdoing and feel righteously enabled to use DARVO, or persistent sexual harassers may have learned over time that DARVO allows them to avoid accountability.

DARVO tactics are also associated with victims blaming themselves more for their abuse, with one explanation being that perpetrators' victim blaming gets internalized by the victims over time. In one study of undergraduates who had confronted someone over a past wrongdoing, exposure to DARVO was strongly related to a confronter's self-blame regardless of the number of apology-related phrases they heard during a confrontation. This study also found that exposure to DARVO was related to the confrontation feeling like it was going poorly, and an increased number of negative emotions for the confronter.

There has been some work specifically checking the relationship between DARVO and gender. The previous study of undergraduate confrontations did not establish who was the perpetrator or victim, but at least found correlations between confronting and accused parties and DARVO. It found that women were more likely to be exposed to DARVO tactics in all forms, including denial and minimization, personal attacks, victim blaming, and reversal of the role of perpetrator and victim. Men and women were equally likely to use DARVO in this study, although previous studies found that male perpetrators were more likely to use aspects of DARVO when it concerned their romantic relationships. Another study found that DARVO in cases of sexual assault had a stronger impact when there was a male victim and female perpetrator, rather than a female victim and male perpetrator.

== See also ==
- Accusation in a mirror – Hate speech incitement technique
- Chilling effect – Discouragement of exercising rights by threats of legal sanctions
- Crocodile tears – False, insincere display of emotion
- Karpman drama triangle – Model of human interaction proposed in 1968
- Psychological projection – Attributing parts of the self to others
- Scientology controversies § Dead agenting
- Tu quoque – Fallacy regarding hypocrisy
- Whataboutism
