= Enabling =

Psychological intervention

In psychotherapy and mental health, enabling is an action or deliberate lack of action that directly or indirectly encourages behaviors in others, especially if said behavior is dysfunctional.

== Positive ==
As a positive term, "enabling" describes patterns of interaction which allow individuals to develop and grow in a healthy direction. These patterns may be on any scale, for example within the family.

== Negative ==
In a negative sense, "enabling" can describe dysfunctional behavior approaches that are intended to help resolve a specific problem but, in fact, may perpetuate or exacerbate the problem. A common theme of enabling in this latter sense is that third parties take responsibility or blame, or make accommodations for a person's ineffective or harmful conduct (often with the best of intentions, or from fear or insecurity which inhibits action). The practical effect is that the person themselves does not have to do so, and is shielded from awareness of the harm it may do, and the need or pressure to change.

=== Codependency ===
Codependency is a theory that attempts to explain imbalanced relationships in which one person enables another person's self-destructive behavior such as addiction, substance abuse, poor mental health, immaturity, irresponsibility, or under-achievement.

Enabling may be observed in the relationship between a person with a substance use disorder and their partner, spouse or a parent. Enabling behaviors may include making excuses that prevent others from holding the person accountable, or cleaning up messes that occur in the wake of their impaired judgment. Enabling may prevent psychological growth in the person being enabled, and may contribute to negative symptoms in the enabler. Enabling may be driven by concern for retaliation, or fear of consequence to the person with the substance use disorder, such as job loss, injury or suicide. A parent may allow an addicted adult child to live at home without contributing to the household such as by helping with chores, and be manipulated by the child's excuses, emotional attacks, and threats of self-harm.

=== Abuse ===
In the context of abuse, enablers are distinct from flying monkeys (proxy abuse). Enablers simply allow (not specifically support) the abuser's own bad behavior while flying monkeys always support and perpetrate bad behavior to a third party on their behalf. Padilla et al. (2007), in analyzing destructive leadership, distinguished between conformers and colluders, in which the latter are those who actively participate in the destructive behavior.

Emotional abuse is a brainwashing method that over time can turn someone into an enabler. While the abuser often plays the victim, it is quite common for the true victim to believe that he or she is responsible for the abuse and thus must adapt and adjust to it.

== See also ==
- Personal boundaries
- Sycophancy
