= Games People Play (book) =

1964 book by Eric Berne

Games People Play: The Psychology of Human Relationships
- First edition
- Author: Eric Berne
- Publisher: Grove Press
- Publication date: 1964
- Pages: 216
- ISBN: 0-345-41003-3

Games People Play: The Psychology of Human Relationships is a 1964 book by psychiatrist Eric Berne, popularizing Berne's model of transactional analysis. The book was a bestseller at the time of its publication, despite drawing academic criticism for some of the psychoanalytic theories it presented. It has been considered one of the first pop psychology books.

== Background ==
The author Eric Berne was a psychiatrist specializing in psychotherapy who began developing alternate theories of interpersonal relationship dynamics in the 1950s. He sought to explain recurring patterns of interpersonal conflicts that he observed, which eventually became the basis of transactional analysis. After being rejected by a local psychoanalytic institute, he focused on writing about his own theories. In 1961, he published Transactional Analysis in Psychotherapy. That book was followed by Games People Play, in 1964. Berne did not intend for Games People Play to explore all aspects of transactional analysis, viewing it instead as an introduction to some of the concepts and patterns he identified. He borrowed money from friends and used his own savings to publish the book.

== Summary ==
In the first half of the book, Berne introduces his theory of transactional analysis as a way of interpreting social interactions. He proposes that individuals encompass three roles or ego states, known as the Parent, the Adult, and the Child, which they switch between. He postulates that while Adult to Adult interactions are largely healthy, dysfunctional interactions can arise when people take on mismatched roles such as Parent and Child or Child and Adult.

The second half of the book catalogues a series of "mind games" identified by Berne, in which people interact through a patterned and predictable series of "transactions" based on these mismatched roles. He states that although these interactions may seem plausible, they are actually a way to conceal hidden motivations under scripted interactions with a predefined outcome. The book uses casual, often humorous phrases such as "See What You Made Me Do," "Why Don't You — Yes But," and "Ain't It Awful" as a way of briefly describing each game. Berne describes the "winner" of these mind games as the person that returns to the Adult ego-state first.

== Reception and influence ==
=== Commercial performance ===
The book was a commercial success, and reached fifth place on The New York Times Best Seller list in March 1966. It has been described as one of the first "pop psychology" books. As of 1965, there had been eight additional printings after the initial run of 3,000, and a total of 83,000 copies had been published. A Time magazine article titled "The Names of the Games," speculated that the book's popularity was due to its applications for both self-help and "cocktail party talk." Carol M. Taylor, in the Florida Communication Journal, noted that many concepts and terms from transactional analysis had made their way into everyday speech.

An audiobook version of the book was released in 2012.

=== Critical reception ===
Despite its popularity among lay readership, Berne's model of interpersonal relationships received criticism from academics. A 1974 article by Roger W. Hite in Speech Teacher noted that although its theoretical basis had inspired numerous subsequent publications, there was little research or scientific support for its claims. Ben L. Glancy in a review for Quarterly Journal of Speech described Berne's work as "parlor psychiatry and party-time psychoanalysis." He wrote that the book oversimplified interpersonal relationships and was "antithetical" to contemporary psychological research. Some scholars, including proponents of transactional analysis, have expressed concern over the popularization of oversimplified psychological concepts as self-help methods. Peter Hartley's Interpersonal Communication noted the relative lack of academic review and interest in popular mental healthcare as opposed to physical healthcare in his overview of transactional analysis.

== See also ==
- I'm OK – You're OK, 1967 pop psychiatry book by Thomas Harris.
