= Transactional analysis =

Theory and practice of a type of psychological analysis

Transactional analysis is a psychoanalytic theory and method of therapy wherein social interactions (or "transactions") are analyzed to determine the ego state of the communicator (whether parent-like, childlike, or adult-like) as a basis for understanding behavior. In transactional analysis, the communicator is taught to alter the ego state as a way to solve emotional problems. The method deviates from Freudian psychoanalysis, which focuses on increasing awareness of the contents of subconsciously held ideas. Eric Berne developed the concept and paradigm of transactional analysis in the late 1950s.

== History ==
Eric Berne presented transactional analysis to the world as a phenomenological approach, supplementing Freud's philosophical construct with observable data. His theory built on the science of Wilder Penfield and René Spitz along with the neo-psychoanalytic thought of people such as Paul Federn, Edoardo Weiss, and Erik Erikson. By moving to an interpersonal motivational theory, he placed it both in opposition to the psychoanalytic traditions of his day and within what would become the psychoanalytic traditions of the future. From Berne, transactional analysts have inherited a determination to create an accessible and user-friendly system, an understanding of script or life-plan, ego states, transactions, and a theory of groups.

Berne's theory was based on the ideas of Freud but with distinct differences. Freudian psychotherapists focused on client personalities. Berne believed that insight could be better discovered by analyzing a client's social transactions. Berne mapped interpersonal relationships to three ego-states of the individuals involved: the Parent, Adult, and Child state. He then investigated communications between individuals based on the current state of each. He called these interpersonal interactions transactions and used the label games to refer to certain patterns of transactions which popped up repeatedly in everyday life in every human interaction.

The origins of transactional analysis can be traced to the first five of Berne's six articles on intuition, which he began writing in 1949. Even at this early juncture and while still working to become a psychoanalyst, his writings challenged Freudian concepts of the unconscious.

In 1956, after 15 years of psychoanalytic training, Berne was refused admission to the San Francisco Psychoanalytic Institute as a fully-fledged psychoanalyst. He interpreted the request for several more years of training as a rejection and decided to walk away from psychoanalysis. Before the end of the year, he had written two seminal papers, both published in 1957.

1. In the first article, Intuition V: The Ego Image, Berne referenced P. Federn, E. Kahn, and H. Silberer, and indicated how he arrived at the concept of ego states, including his idea of separating "adult" from "child".
2. The second paper, Ego States in Psychotherapy, was based on material presented earlier that year at the Psychiatric Clinic, Mt. Zion Hospital, San Francisco, and at the Langley Porter Neuropsychiatric Clinic, UCSF School of Medicine. In that second article, he developed the tripartite scheme used today (Parent, Adult, and Child), introduced the three-circle method of diagramming it, showed how to sketch contaminations, labeled the theory, "structural analysis", and termed it "a new psychotherapeutic approach".

A few months later, he wrote a third article, titled "Transactional Analysis: A New and Effective Method of Group Therapy", which was presented by invitation at the 1957 Western Regional Meeting of the American Group Psychotherapy Association of Los Angeles. With the publication of this paper in the 1958 issue of the American Journal of Psychotherapy, Berne's new method of diagnosis and treatment, transactional analysis, became a permanent part of the psychotherapeutic literature. In addition to restating his concepts of ego states and structural analysis, the 1958 paper added the important new features of transactional analysis proper (i.e. the analysis of transactions), games, and scripts.

His seminar group from the 1950s developed the term transactional analysis (TA) to describe therapies based on his work. By 1964, this expanded into the International Transactional Analysis Association. While still largely ignored by the psychoanalytic community, many therapists have put his ideas into practice.

In the early 1960s, he published both technical and popular accounts of his conclusions. His first full-length book on TA was published in 1961, titled Transactional Analysis in Psychotherapy. Structures and Dynamics of Organizations and Groups (1963) examined the same analysis in a broader context than one-on-one interaction.

=== Overview ===
TA (Transactional Analysis) is not only post-Freudian but, according to its founder's wishes, consciously extra-Freudian. That is to say that, while it has its roots in psychoanalysis, since Berne was a psychoanalytically-trained psychiatrist, it was designed as a dissenting branch of psychoanalysis in that it put its emphasis on transactional rather than "psycho-" analysis.

With its focus on transactions, TA shifted the attention from internal psychological dynamics to the dynamics contained in people's interactions. Rather than believing that increasing awareness of the contents of unconsciously held ideas was the therapeutic path, TA concentrated on the content of people's interactions with each other. Changing these interactions was TA's path to solving emotional problems.

TA also differs from Freudian analysis in explaining that an individual's final emotional state is the result of inner dialogue between different parts of the psyche, as opposed to the Freudian hypothesis that imagery is the overriding determinant of inner emotional state. (For example, depression may be due to ongoing critical verbal messages from the inner Parent to the inner Child.) Berne believed that it is relatively easy to identify these inner dialogues and that the ability to do so is parentally suppressed in early childhood.

In addition Berne believed in making a commitment to "curing" his clients rather than just understanding them. To that end he introduced one of the most important aspects of TA: the contract—an agreement entered into by both client and therapist to pursue specific changes that the client desires.

Revising Freud's concept of the human psyche as composed of the id, ego, and super-ego, Berne postulated in addition three "ego states"—the Parent, Adult, and Child states—which were largely shaped through childhood experiences. These three are all part of Freud's ego; none represents the id or the superego.

Unhealthy childhood experiences can lead to being pathologically fixated in the Child and Parent ego states, bringing discomfort to an individual and/or others in a variety of forms, including many types of mental illness.

Berne considered how individuals interact with one another and how the ego states affect each set of transactions. Unproductive or counterproductive transactions were considered to be signs of ego state problems. Analyzing these transactions according to the person's individual developmental history would enable the person to "get better". Berne thought that virtually everyone has something problematic about their ego states and that negative behaviour would not be addressed by "treating" only the problematic individual.

Berne identified a typology of common counterproductive social interactions, identifying these as "games".

Berne presented his theories in two popular books on transactional analysis: Games People Play (1964) and What Do You Say After You Say Hello? (1975).

By the 1970s, because of TA's non-technical and non-threatening jargon and model of the human psyche, many of its terms and concepts were adopted by eclectic therapists as part of their individual approaches to psychotherapy. It also served well as a therapy model for groups of patients, or marital/family counselees, where interpersonal (rather than intrapersonal) disturbances were the focus of treatment.

TA's popularity in the U.S. waned in the 1970s. The more dedicated TA purists banded together in 1964 with Berne to form a research and professional accrediting body, the International Transactional Analysis Association, or ITAA.

=== Fifty years later ===
Within the framework of transactional analysis, more recent transactional analysts have developed different and overlapping theories of transactional analysis: cognitive, behavioural, relational, redecision, integrative, constructivist, narrative, body-work, positive psychological, personality adaptational, self-reparenting, psychodynamic and neuroconstructivist.

Some transactional analysts highlight the many things they have in common with cognitive behavioral therapy: the use of contracts with clear goals, the attention to cognitive distortions (called "adult decontamination" or "child deconfusion"), the focus on the client's conscious attitudes and behaviours and the use of "strokes".

Cognitive-based transactional analysts use ego state identification to identify communication distortions and teach different functional options in the dynamics of communication. Some make additional contracts for more profound work involving life plans or scripts or with unconscious processes, including those which manifest in the client-therapist relationship as transference and countertransference, and define themselves as psychodynamic or relational transactional analysts. Some highlight the study and promotion of subjective well-being and optimal human functioning rather than pathology and so identify with positive psychology. Some are increasingly influenced by current research in attachment, mother-infant interaction and by the implications of interpersonal neurobiology and non-linear dynamic systems.

== Outline ==
Diagram of concepts in transactional analysis, based on cover of Eric Berne's 1964 book Games People Play.

Transactional analysis integrates the theories of psychology and psychotherapy because it has elements of psychoanalytic, humanist and cognitive ideas.

According to the International Transactional Analysis Association, TA "is a theory of personality and a systematic psychotherapy for personal growth and personal change."

1. As a theory of personality, TA describes how people are structured psychologically. It uses what is perhaps its best known model, the ego-state (Parent-Adult-Child) model, to do this. The same model helps explain how people function and express their personality in their behaviour
2. As Berne set up his psychology, there are four life positions that a person can hold, and holding a particular psychological position has profound implications for how an individual operationalizes his or her life. The positions are stated as:
  1. I'm OK and you are OK. This is the healthiest position about life and it means that I feel good about myself and that I feel good about others and their competence.
  2. I'm OK and you are not OK. In this position, I feel good about myself but I see others as damaged or less than me and this is usually not healthy.
  3. I'm not OK and you are OK. In this position, the person sees him/herself as the weak partner in relationships as the others in life are definitely better than the self. The person who holds this position will unconsciously accept abuse as OK.
  4. I'm not OK and you are not OK. This is the worst position to be in as it means that I believe that I am in a terrible state and the rest of the world is as bad. Consequently, there is no hope for any ultimate supports.
3. It is a theory of communication that can be extended to the analysis of systems and organisations.
4. It offers a theory for child development by explaining how our adult patterns of life originated in childhood. This explanation is based on the idea of a "Life (or Childhood) Script": the assumption that we continue to re-play childhood strategies, even when this results in pain or defeat. Thus it claims to offer a theory of psychopathology.
5. In practical application, it can be used in the diagnosis and treatment of many types of psychological disorders and provides a method of therapy for individuals, couples, families and groups.
6. Outside the therapeutic field, it has been used in education to help teachers remain in clear communication at an appropriate level, in counselling and consultancy, in management and communications training and by other bodies.

Philosophy

- People are OK; thus each person has validity, importance, equality of respect.
- Positive reinforcement increases feelings of being OK.
- All people have a basic lovable core and a desire for positive growth.
- Everyone (with only few exceptions, such as the severely brain-damaged) has the capacity to think.
- All of the many facets of an individual have a positive value for them in some way.
- People decide their story and destiny, therefore these decisions can be changed.
- All emotional difficulties are curable.

Freedom from historical maladaptations embedded in the childhood script is required in order to become free of inappropriate, inauthentic and displaced emotions which are not a fair and honest reflection of here-and-now life (such as echoes of childhood suffering, pity-me and other mind games, compulsive behaviour and repetitive dysfunctional life patterns). The aim of change under TA is to move toward autonomy (freedom from childhood script), spontaneity, intimacy, problem solving as opposed to avoidance or passivity, cure as an ideal rather than merely making progress and learning new choices.

== Ego-state or Parent–Adult–Child (PAC) models ==
Many of the core TA models and concepts can be categorised into

- Structural analysis – analysis of the individual psyche
- Transactional analysis proper – analysis of interpersonal transactions based on structural analysis of the individuals involved in the transaction
- Game analysis – repeating sequences of transactions that lead to a result subconsciously agreed to by the parties involved in the game
- Script analysis – a life plan that may involve long-term involvement in particular games in order to reach the life pay-off of the individual

At any given time, a person experiences and manifests his or her personality through a mixture of behaviours, thoughts, and feelings. Typically, according to TA, there are three ego states that people consistently use:

- Parent ("exteropsyche"): a state in which people behave, feel, and think in response to an unconscious mimicking of how their parents (or other parental figures) acted, or how they interpreted their parent's actions. For example, a person may shout at someone out of frustration because they learned from an influential figure in childhood the lesson that this seemed to be a way of relating that worked.
- Adult ("neopsyche"): a state of the ego which is most like an artificially intelligent system processing information and making predictions about major emotions that could affect its operation. Learning to strengthen the Adult is a goal of TA. While people are in the Adult ego state, they are directed towards an objective appraisal of reality.
- Child ("archaeopsyche"): a state in which people behave, feel, and think similarly to how they did in childhood. For example, a person who receives a poor evaluation at work may respond by looking at the floor and crying or pouting, as when scolded as a child. Conversely, a person who receives a good evaluation may respond with a broad smile and a joyful gesture of thanks. The Child is the source of emotions, creation, recreation, spontaneity, and intimacy.

Berne differentiated his Parent, Adult, and Child ego states from actual adults, parents, and children, by using capital letters when describing them. These ego states may or may not represent the relationships that they act out. For example, in the workplace, an adult supervisor may take on the Parent role, and scold an adult employee as though he were a Child. Or a child, using the Parent ego state, could scold her actual parent as though the parent were a Child.

Within each of these ego states are subdivisions. Thus Parental figures are often either

- more nurturing (permission-giving, security-giving) or
- more criticising (comparing to family traditions and ideals in generally negative ways);

Childhood behaviours are either

- more natural (free) or
- more adapted to others.

These subdivisions categorize individuals' patterns of behaviour, feelings, and ways of thinking, which can be functional (beneficial or positive) or dysfunctional/counterproductive (negative).

Berne states that there are four types of diagnosis of ego states. They are: "behavioural" diagnosis, "social" diagnosis, "historical" diagnosis, and "phenomenological" diagnosis. A complete diagnosis would include all four types. It has subsequently been demonstrated that there is a fifth type of diagnosis, namely "contextual", because the same behaviour will be diagnosed differently according to the context of the behaviour.

Ego states do not correspond directly to Sigmund Freud's ego, superego, and id, although there are obvious parallels: Superego/Parent; Ego/Adult; Id/Child. Ego states are consistent for each person, and (argue TA practitioners) are more observable than the components of Freud's model. In other words, the ego state from which someone is communicating is evident in their behavior, manner and expression.

== Emotional blackmail ==
Emotional blackmail is a term coined by psychotherapist Dr. Susan Forward, about controlling people in relationships and the theory that fear, obligation, and guilt (FOG) are the transactional dynamics at play between the controller and the person being controlled. Understanding these dynamics are useful to anyone trying to extricate from the controlling behavior of another person, and deal with their own compulsions to do things that are uncomfortable, undesirable, burdensome, or self-sacrificing for others.

Forward and Frazier identify four blackmail types each with their own mental manipulation style:

Type	Example
Punisher's threat	Eat the food I cooked for you or I'll hurt you.
Self-punisher's threat	Eat the food I cooked for you or I'll hurt myself.
Sufferer's threat	Eat the food I cooked for you. I was saving it for myself. I wonder what will happen now.
Tantalizer's threat	Eat the food I cooked for you and you just may get a really yummy dessert.

There are different levels of demands—demands that are of little consequence, demands that involve important issues or personal integrity, demands that affect major life decisions, and/or demands that are dangerous or illegal.

== Effectiveness ==
A 1995 research article by the staff of Consumer Reports, with Martin Seligman as consultant, assessed that psychotherapy conducted by a group of Transactional Analysts is more effective than that of groups of psychiatrists, psychologists, social workers, marriage counselors, and physicians; and that psychotherapy lasting more than six months is 40% more effective than that lasting less than six months.

A 2010 review found 50 studies on transactional analysis that concluded it had a positive effect, and 10 where no positive effect was found. No studies that concluded a negative effect were found.

== Criticism ==
The three major limitations of Berne's work are:

- Berne's emphasis on structural explanation (rather than on those derived from an energy theory)
- His failure to develop a script reversal technique which would satisfy his own criteria of conciseness and theoretical consistency
- An apparent dependence upon content analysis

== See also ==
- Afterburn (psychotherapy)
- Expectancy violations theory
- Karpman drama triangle
- Love triangle
- Mind games
- Reachback
- Script Analysis
- Self-fulfilling prophecy
- Self-parenting
- Sigmund Freud's conception of the id, ego, and super-ego
- The Thirty-Six Dramatic Situations
- Transactionalism
- Yes, But..., a fictional film which deals with TA

== Sources ==
=== Books by Eric Berne (popular) ===
- (1964) Games People Play. New York: Grove Press. ISBN 0-14-002768-8.
  - (1996) (Paperback reissue ed.) New York: Ballantine Books. ISBN 0-345-41003-3.
- (1975) A Layman's Guide to Psychiatry and Psychoanalysis (paperback); 1975, Grove Press; ISBN 0-394-17833-5.
- (1975) What Do You Say After You Say Hello? ISBN 0-552-09806-X.

=== Books by Eric Berne (other) ===
- Transactional Analysis in Psychotherapy. ISBN 0-285-64776-8.
- The Structure and Dynamics of Organizations and Groups. ISBN 0-345-23481-2.

=== Books by other authors ===
- Boyce, Gregory J., No More Drama: A Practical Guide to Healthy Relationships, (Soul Dance Query 2012) ISBN 978-0-9878135-0-3.
- Clarke, Susan L., Clarke's Dictionary of Transactional Analysis [Paperback 2012]. ISBN 978-1450720168, ISBN 1450720161.
- Corkille Briggs, Dorothy, Celebrate Your Self. (1986). Bantam Doubleday Dell Publishing Group. ISBN 0-385-13105-4.
- Freed, Alvyn M. and Regina Faul-Jensen (illustrator) (1978). T.A. For Teens. Sacramento, CA: Jalmar Press. ISBN 0-915190-03-6.
- Greer, Art, No Grownups in Heaven: A T-A Primer for Christians (and Others) (Hawthorn Books, 1975). ISBN 978-0801554049.
- Harris, Thomas A., "I'm OK, You're Okay" (Harper & Row 1967). ISBN 978-0060724276.
- Muriel, James and Dorothy Jongeward, Born to Win: Transactional Analysis with Gestalt Experiments (Addison-Wesley, 1971).
- Nelson, Leslie, TA for Military Kids (Inspiring Voices. January 9, 2014). ISBN 1462408745.
- Singer, Margaret and Janja Lalich, Crazy Therapies: What Are They? Do They Work? 1996, Reparenting, TA and ITAA. ISBN 0-7879-0278-0.
- Steiner, Claude and JoAnn Dick (illustrator), The Original Warm Fuzzy Tale: A Fairytale. Sacramento: Jalmar Press, 1977. ISBN 0-915190-08-7.
- Steiner, Claude (1990; Paperback reissue ed.). Scripts People Live: Transactional Analysis of Life Scripts. New York: Grove Press. ISBN 0-394-49267-6.
- Stewart, Ian and Vann Joines, TA Today: A New Introduction to Transactional Analysis. ISBN 1-870244-00-1.
- Tangolo, Anna Emanuela, Psychodynamic Psychotherapy with Transactional Analysis: Theory and Narration of a Living Experience, Karnac Books, 2015 (ISBN 9781782201557).
- White, Tony, Working with Suicidal Individuals (Jessica Kingsley Publishers, 2011). ISBN 978-1-84905-115-6.
- White, Tony, Working with Drug and Alcohol Users (Jessica Kingsley Publishers, 2012). ISBN 978-1-84905-294-8.
