= Syndrome =

Association of several clinically recognizable features

A syndrome is a set of medical signs and symptoms which are correlated with each other and often associated with a particular disease or disorder. The word derives from the Greek σύνδρομον, meaning "concurrence". When a syndrome is paired with a definite cause this becomes a disease. In some instances, a syndrome is so closely linked with a pathogenesis or cause that the words syndrome, disease, and disorder end up being used interchangeably for them. This substitution of terminology often confuses the reality and meaning of medical diagnoses. This is especially true of inherited syndromes. About one third of all phenotypes that are listed in OMIM are described as dysmorphic, which usually refers to the facial gestalt. For example, Down syndrome, Wolf–Hirschhorn syndrome, and Andersen–Tawil syndrome are disorders with known pathogeneses, so each is more than just a set of signs and symptoms, despite the syndrome nomenclature. In other instances, a syndrome is not specific to only one disease. For example, toxic shock syndrome can be caused by various toxins; another medical syndrome named as premotor syndrome can be caused by various brain lesions; and premenstrual syndrome is not a disease but simply a set of symptoms.

If an underlying genetic cause is suspected but not known, a condition may be referred to as a genetic association (often just "association" in context). By definition, an association indicates that the collection of signs and symptoms occurs in combination more frequently than would be likely by chance alone.

Syndromes are often named after the physician or group of physicians that discovered them or initially described the full clinical picture. Such eponymous syndrome names are examples of medical eponyms. Recently, there has been a shift towards naming conditions descriptively (by symptoms or underlying cause) rather than eponymously, but the eponymous syndrome names often persist in common usage.

The defining of syndromes has sometimes been termed syndromology, but it is usually not a separate discipline from nosology and differential diagnosis generally, which inherently involve pattern recognition (both sentient and automated) and differentiation among overlapping sets of signs and symptoms. Teratology (dysmorphology) by its nature involves the defining of congenital syndromes that may include birth defects (pathoanatomy), dysmetabolism (pathophysiology), and neurodevelopmental disorders.

== Subsyndromal ==
When there are a number of symptoms suggesting a particular disease or condition but does not meet the defined criteria used to make a diagnosis of that disease or condition. This can be a bit subjective because it is ultimately up to the clinician to make the diagnosis. This could be because it has not advanced to the level or passed a threshold or just similar symptoms cause by other issues. Subclinical is synonymous since one of its definitions is "where some criteria are met but not enough to achieve clinical status"; but subclinical is not always interchangeable since it can also mean "not detectable or producing effects that are not detectable by the usual clinical tests"; i.e., asymptomatic.

== Usage ==
=== General medicine ===
In medicine, a broad definition of syndrome is used, which describes a collection of symptoms and findings without necessarily tying them to a single identifiable pathogenesis. Examples of infectious syndromes include encephalitis and hepatitis, which can both have several different infectious causes.

==== History ====
Early texts by physicians noted the symptoms of various maladies and introduced diagnoses based upon those symptoms. For example, Avicenna's The Canon of Medicine (1025) describes diagnosing pleurisy by its symptoms, including chronic fever, cough, shooting pains, and labored breathing. The 17th century doctor Thomas Sydenham likewise approached diagnoses based upon collections of symptoms.

=== Psychiatry and psychopathology ===
Psychiatric syndromes often called psychopathological syndromes (psychopathology refers both to psychic dysfunctions occurring in mental disorders, and the study of the origin, diagnosis, development, and treatment of mental disorders).

In Russia those psychopathological syndromes are used in modern clinical practice and described in psychiatric literature in the details: asthenic syndrome, obsessive syndrome, emotional syndromes (for example, manic syndrome, depressive syndrome), Cotard's syndrome, catatonic syndrome, hebephrenic syndrome, delusional and hallucinatory syndromes (for example, paranoid syndrome, paranoid-hallucinatory syndrome, Kandinsky-Clérambault's syndrome also known as syndrome of psychic automatism, hallucinosis), paraphrenic syndrome, psychopathic syndromes (includes all personality disorders), clouding of consciousness syndromes (for example, twilight clouding of consciousness, amential syndrome also known as amentia, delirious syndrome, stunned consciousness syndrome, oneiroid syndrome), hysteric syndrome, neurotic syndrome, Korsakoff's syndrome, hypochondriacal syndrome, paranoiac syndrome, senestopathic syndrome, encephalopathic syndrome.

Some examples of psychopathological syndromes used in modern Germany are psychoorganic syndrome, depressive syndrome, paranoid-hallucinatory syndrome, obsessive-compulsive syndrome, autonomic syndrome, hostility syndrome, manic syndrome, apathy syndrome.

Münchausen syndrome, Ganser syndrome, neuroleptic-induced deficit syndrome, olfactory reference syndrome are also well-known.

==== History ====
The most important psychopathological syndromes were classified into three groups ranked in order of severity by German psychiatrist Emil Kraepelin (1856—1926). The first group, which includes the mild disorders, consists of five syndromes: emotional, paranoid, hysterical, delirious, and impulsive. The second, intermediate, group includes two syndromes: schizophrenic syndrome and speech-hallucinatory syndrome. The third includes the most severe disorders, and consists of three syndromes: epileptic, oligophrenic and dementia. In Kraepelin's era, epilepsy was viewed as a mental illness; Karl Jaspers also considered "genuine epilepsy" a "psychosis", and described "the three major psychoses" as schizophrenia, epilepsy, and manic-depressive illness.

=== Medical genetics ===
In the field of medical genetics, the term "syndrome" is traditionally only used when the underlying genetic cause is known. Thus, trisomy 21 is commonly known as Down syndrome.

Until 2005, CHARGE syndrome was most frequently referred to as "CHARGE association". When the major causative gene (CHD7) for the condition was discovered, the name was changed. The consensus underlying cause of VACTERL association has not been determined, and thus it is not commonly referred to as a "syndrome".

=== Other fields ===
In biology, "syndrome" is used in a more general sense to describe characteristic sets of features in various contexts. Examples include behavioral syndromes, as well as pollination syndromes and seed dispersal syndromes.

In orbital mechanics and astronomy, Kessler syndrome refers to the effect where the density of objects in low Earth orbit (LEO) is high enough that collisions between objects could cause a cascade in which each collision generates space debris that increases the likelihood of further collisions.

In quantum error correction theory syndromes correspond to errors in code words which are determined with syndrome measurements, which only collapse the state on an error state, so that the error can be corrected without affecting the quantum information stored in the code words.

== Naming ==
There is no set common convention for the naming of newly identified syndromes. In the past, syndromes were often named after the physician or scientist who identified and described the condition in an initial publication. These are referred to as "eponymous syndromes". In some cases, diseases are named after the patient who initially presents with symptoms, or their home town (Stockholm syndrome). There have been isolated cases of patients being eager to have their syndromes named after them, while their physicians are hesitant. When a syndrome is named after a person, there is some difference of opinion as to whether it should take the possessive form or not (e.g., Down syndrome vs. Down's syndrome). North American usage has tended to favor the non-possessive form, while European references often use the possessive. A 2009 study demonstrated a trend away from the possessive form in Europe in medical literature from 1970 through 2008.

== Underlying cause ==
Even in syndromes with no known etiology, the presence of the associated symptoms with a statistically improbable correlation normally leads the researchers to hypothesize that there exists an unknown underlying cause for all the described symptoms.

== See also ==
- List of syndromes
- Toxidrome
- Symptom
- Sequence (medicine)
- Characteristics of syndromic ASD conditions
