= Oneiroid syndrome =

Dream-like fantastic delusional state

- Pronunciation: [ə(ʊ)ˈnʌɪɹɔɪd ˈsɪndɹoʊm]
- Specialty: Psychiatry
- Symptoms: Vivid scenic hallucinations, pseudohallucinations, catatonic symptoms (mutism, waxy flexibility, negativism), delusions, disorientation in place, time, self, double orientation, stupor or sub-stupor
- Duration: A few weeks or days
- Causes: Catatonic schizophrenia
- Diagnostic method: Based on symptoms
- Differential diagnosis: Delirium

Oneiroid syndrome (OS) is a psychiatric condition marked by dream-like disturbances of consciousness. It is characterised by vivid scenic hallucinations, catatonic symptoms (ranging from stupor to agitation), delusions, and kaleidoscopic psychopathological experiences. The term originates from the Ancient Greek words "ὄνειρος" (óneiros, meaning "dream") and "εἶδος" (eîdos, meaning "form" or "likeness"), translating to "dream-like" or "oneiric" (occasionally described as "nightmare-like").

The oneiroid state is a hallmark of this syndrome, defined by an altered state of consciousness where individuals experience profound confusion and disorientation regarding time and place. Patients may be entirely immersed in their hallucinatory experiences, often showing little to no engagement with external reality. This phenomenon is sometimes referred to as oneiroid schizophrenia, particularly when associated with catatonic symptoms and hallucinatory absorption.

In oneiroid syndrome, the dream-like experiences are vivid to the point of being perceived as real by the individual. However, unlike delirium, the imaginative experiences in OS are internally projected—patients perceive them as originating within their minds rather than as external phenomena.

Potential causes include:

- Endogenous conditions, such as schizophrenia, particularly the catatonic subtype.
- Exogenous factors, including infectious diseases (e.g., encephalitis), intoxication (e.g., hallucinogenic substances), and traumatic brain injuries.

Despite its distinct clinical presentation, oneiroid syndrome is not widely recognised in contemporary psychiatric diagnostic systems such as the DSM-5. Its absence from standard classification systems likely contributes to its limited coverage in psychiatric textbooks.

== History ==
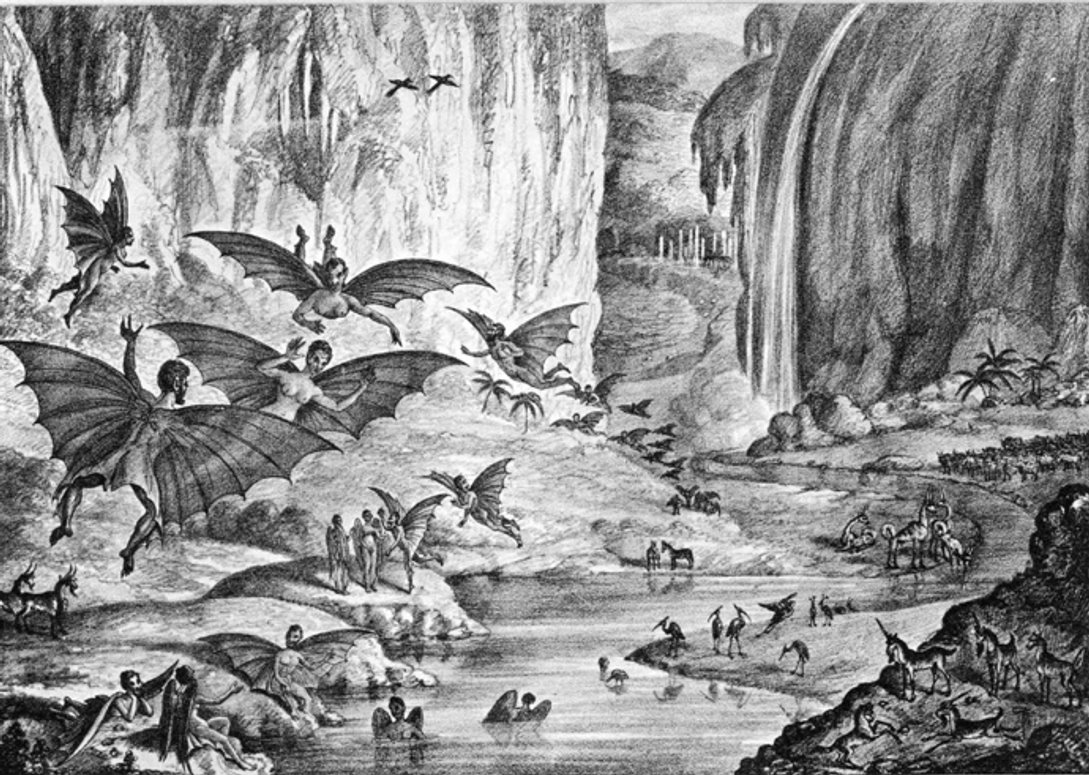
An example of a oneiroid hallucination. Patients experiencing a oneiroid state often report vivid, dream-like visual phenomena.

The German physician Wilhelm Mayer-Gross first described oneiroid states in 1924. Mayer-Gross's 1924 dissertation "Self-descriptions of Confusional States: the Oneiroid Form of Experience" (German: Selbstschilderungen der Verwirrtheit: die Oneiroide Erlebnisform) is considered to be the first monograph discussing oneiroid states. It is the psychopathological method (known to German psychiatrists as the "phenomenological method" – phänomenologische Methode).

== Use of term ==
The term oneiroid syndrome, while generally known to European and Russian psychiatrists, remains largely unfamiliar in the United States.

== ICD-9 adapted for the Soviet Union ==
Included in the 9th edition of Manual of the International Statistical Classification of Diseases, Injuries, and Causes of Death, adapted for the USSR (ICD-9, 1983), were two diagnoses of oneiroid states in section 295.2 (catatonic schizophrenia):

- ICD-9 code 295.24: oneiroid catatonia as a variant of shiftlike progressive schizophrenia (Russian: кататония онейроидная как вариант шубообразной шизофрении);
- ICD-9 code 295.25: oneiroid catatonia as a variant of recurrent schizophrenia (Russian: кататония онейроидная как вариант периодической шизофрении).

Soviet psychiatric research indicates that oneiroid syndrome most commonly occurs in conjunction with catatonic schizophrenia. In the majority of cases, the catatonic phenomena associated with catatonic schizophrenia (ICD-10 code F20.2) are accompanied by oneiroid syndrome, as outlined in the current ICD-10 classification.

== Clinical characteristics ==
Oneiroid syndrome is distinguished by the fantastical and dreamlike nature of its psychotic experiences. Key features include conflicting emotions, contradictory thoughts, and actions, as well as a profound sense of dramatic changes in reality. Patients often experience mixed feelings of triumph and catastrophe simultaneously. The syndrome is commonly accompanied by frequent hallucinations, pseudohallucinations, and visual illusions.

Individuals with oneiroid syndrome typically recognise the perceived phenomena as belonging to alternate realms or dimensions inaccessible to ordinary people, rather than to the tangible, external world. These experiences often involve elaborate, detailed narratives in which patients mentally participate, sometimes observing themselves from an external perspective. However, their outward behaviour rarely reflects the richness or intensity of these internal experiences.

Patients frequently report vivid and colourful pseudohallucinations. The environment may appear to them as a staged theatrical production, and in some cases, they perceive their own lives as a staged performance, akin to the Truman Show delusion.

Disorientation regarding time and place is common, accompanied by a "double awareness," where the patient simultaneously perceives themselves as being in their current physical location (e.g., a psychiatric hospital) while also engaging in the fantastical narrative. Others around the patient may be perceived as participants in this imagined storyline, seen as either allies or antagonists.

Despite these vivid internal experiences, patients often display limited physical activity. They may lie still with their eyes closed, occasionally making slow, fluid hand movements suggestive of "flying." Some patients wander through their environment with an "enchanted smile," appearing withdrawn into their inner world. Distortions of time are frequent, with patients describing experiences spanning years, even millennia, often involving themes such as death, resurrection, and cloning.

The themes of oneiroid experiences are typically influenced by the patient's personal history, as well as by literature, films, or other media. Patients are sometimes capable of reporting these experiences directly, though their accounts are often fragmented or inconsistent.

=== Catatonic disorder due to oneiroid syndrome ===
Oneiroid catatonia combines dreamlike psychotic experiences with catatonic symptoms. This condition can manifest as catatonic stupor with clear consciousness (lucid catatonia) or with altered consciousness (oneiroid catatonia). During these episodes, patients may exhibit:

- Restricted movements or stereotypies (e.g., body-rocking, head banging).
- Mutism or incoherent speech, although occasionally they may respond to questions, providing insight into their disoriented state.
- Waxy flexibility, impulsive actions, or negativism (resistance to commands or active opposition).

Patients may experience profound disorientation, not only regarding place and time but also about their own identity and personality.

=== Aetiology and Course ===
Oneiroid syndrome often presents as an acute episode of schizophrenia, typically lasting a few days to weeks. Early signs include sleep disturbances and escalating anxiety, which rapidly progress to confusion and vivid derealization. This state serves as the foundation for unsystematic and fragmented delusions, often accompanied by strong emotional responses such as amazement or ecstasy.

Over time, patients may develop catatonic symptoms, alternating between stupor and agitation. The psychosis generally resolves gradually, with hallucinations disappearing first, while catatonic behaviours may persist longer. After recovery, patients may recall fragments of their psychotic experiences but often have amnesia regarding real-world events during the episode.

Oneiroid states can also be associated with Kandinsky-Clérambault syndrome, particularly in individuals with paranoid schizophrenia.

=== Prognosis ===
Oneiroid catatonia is considered one of the more favourable forms of schizophrenic psychosis. Spontaneous recovery is common, and with appropriate treatment, patients typically recover without significant long-term personality changes. Residual delusions may persist briefly after the episode, but complications are minimal.

=== Lethal catatonia ===
During episodes of severe consciousness disruption, patients may very rarely develop hyperthermia, which can lead to increasing cerebral oedema and impaired cardiac function. This condition, referred to as "febrile schizophrenia" in Russia and "lethal catatonia" in Western literature, is a critical medical emergency. Immediate initiation of intensive therapy has significantly improved survival rates for these patients.

The use of antipsychotics in cases of lethal catatonia is considered both ineffective and highly dangerous. Instead, recommended treatments include:

- Benzodiazepines, for their sedative and muscle-relaxing properties.
- Symptomatic therapy, to manage specific clinical manifestations.
- Dantrolene, to counteract hyperthermia and muscle rigidity.
- Bromocriptine, a dopamine agonist.
- Ketamine and amantadine, which may have therapeutic benefits in this condition.

Prompt and appropriate intervention is essential to prevent fatal outcomes in lethal catatonia.

== Pathological associations ==
The precise aetiology of oneiroid syndrome remains unclear. However, it is pathologically associated with the following conditions:

- Endogenous diseases, particularly schizophrenia (with a strong association with catatonic schizophrenia).
- Exogenous organic diseases, such as:
  - Infectious conditions (e.g., encephalitis)
  - Intoxication (e.g., hallucinogenic substances such as LSD, hashish, or ketamine)
  - Traumatic brain injury
  - Epilepsy
  - Delirium tremens

While most cases of oneiroid syndrome are linked to schizophrenia (specifically oneiroid catatonia), it has also been observed in the context of organic brain lesions and intoxications.

=== Features of exogenous oneiroid syndrome ===
Oneiroid syndrome associated with exogenous diseases differs significantly from its schizophrenic counterpart:

- Self-consciousness is preserved, unlike in schizophrenic oneiroid states.
- Catatonic symptoms are absent, and the syndrome typically resolves more quickly.

In cases of exogenous organic oneiroid syndrome, its presence signals a severe pathological response to the underlying organic condition. A transition to amential syndrome (characterised by severe confusion and disorientation) or mental fog is considered an unfavourable prognostic sign.

=== Differences between schizophrenic and exogenous oneiroid ===
Exogenous oneiroid syndrome presents distinct clinical features compared to schizophrenic oneiroid:

- It often occupies an intermediate position between delirium and oneiroid, with a rapid onset and dynamic progression of symptoms.
- Symptoms frequently intensify during the evening, a pattern characteristic of delirium.
- Resolution of symptoms often occurs following deep sleep, further aligning with delirium.
- This overlap suggests that these exogenous psychoses could be classified as variants of "fantastic delirium." Hallucinogens (LSD, hashish, ketamine) and hormonal preparations (e.g., corticosteroids) are recognised triggers for exogenous oneiroid syndrome.

== Stages of the oneiroid syndrome ==
In 1961, Bulgarian psychiatrist S. T. Stoianov conducted a study on the dynamics and progression of oneiroid syndrome in cases of "periodic" or recurrent schizophrenia. At the time, the ICD-9 included the diagnosis 295.79: recurrent schizophrenia without other specifications (also referred to as periodic or circular schizophrenia). This diagnosis was removed from the ICD-10 and is not present in the DSM-5 either.

Based on Stoianov's research, the course of oneiroid syndrome in recurrent schizophrenia is divided into six distinct stages:

- Initial general-somatic and vegetative disorder
- Delusional mood
- Affective-delusional depersonalization and derealization
- Fantastic-delusional and affective depersonalization and derealization
- Illusional depersonalization and derealization
- Catatonic-oneiroid state

This six-stage framework provides a detailed understanding of the progression of oneiroid syndrome in recurrent schizophrenia.

== Electroencephalography ==
In most of the cases of the oneiroid syndrome, there were crude pathological changes in the electroencephalography (EEG).

== See also ==
- Clouding of consciousness
- Delirium
