= Anxiety sensitivity =

Fear of anxious behaviors or feelings

Anxiety sensitivity (AS) refers to the fear of behaviors or sensations associated with the experience of anxiety, and a misinterpretation of such sensations as dangerous. According to David Clark and Aaron Beck anxiety sensitivity is an intolerance (even fear) of the physical, behavioral, and cognitive symptoms of anxiety because of beliefs that these symptoms have negative physical, social, or psychological consequences. Bodily sensations related to anxiety, such as nausea and palpitations, are mistaken as harmful experiences, causing anxiety or fear to intensify. For example, a person with high anxiety sensitivity may fear the shakes as impending neurological disorder, or may suspect lightheadedness is the result of a brain tumour; conversely, a person with low anxiety sensitivity is likely to identify these as harmless and attach no significance to them. The Anxiety Sensitivity Index attempts to assess anxiety sensitivity.

Anxiety sensitivity (fear of anxiety-related sensations) is distinct from, although related to and associated with, health anxiety (a key feature of which is heightened awareness of physical sensations, known as body vigilance).

Similarly, it is distinguished from general "trait anxiety" by a focus on physical (somatic) symptoms and sensations, as opposed to general stress.

== History ==
In the 1970s and 1980s the fear of fear was considered as an important consequence of panic attacks. It was assumed that after a first panic attack, people learn to fear recurrence, and thus develop agoraphobia.

In 1985, Reiss and McNally re-interpreted the "fear of fear" as anxiety sensitivity. Instead of viewing it as the anticipation of recurrent panic attacks, Reiss and McNally suggested that it arises from beliefs that the experience of anxiety is itself harmful. A person who believes that a pounding heart is a sign of impending cardiac trouble, for example, might show a fear of fear rooted in cognitive beliefs rather than in associative learning.

The concept of anxiety sensitivity expressed two ideas. First, it implied that the fear of fear is at least sometimes rooted in cognition or beliefs, not Pavlovian associations with prior panic experiences. Second, it implied that the fear of fear could precede panic experiences and even presage panic attacks, post-traumatic stress, phobias, and other anxiety conditions.

=== Anxiety Sensitivity Index ===
In 1984, Steven Reiss wrote the 16 items on the brief questionnaire he called and copyrighted as the "Anxiety Sensitivity Index" (ASI). In 1986 Reiss, Peterson, Gursky, & McNally published the ASI questionnaire along with initial validity evidence. As of July, 2013, the ASI has been used in more than 1,600 research studies. As was predicted by Reiss and McNally (1985), a high score on the ASI is a powerful and unique predictor of who will have panic attacks, post-traumatic stress, and ordinary fears or phobias.

By helping researchers identify people with a high risk of panic disorder and other anxiety condition, the construct of anxiety sensitivity has created new research opportunities to study the prevention of disorders affecting more than five million Americans.

Harvard's Richard McNally, Florida State's Norman Schmidt, and University of Houston psychologist Michael Zvolensky published research that established the validity of anxiety sensitivity. George Washington University psychologist Rolf Peterson, and Yale's Wendy Silverman, extended the anxiety sensitivity concept to children.

When the ASI was first published, it was widely criticized as superfluous. It was thought that, since everybody avoids anxiety, there is no need to study individual differences. We now know, however, that while everybody avoids anxiety, some people go to much greater lengths than others to do so. These individuals are at risk for panic attacks, post-traumatic stress disorder, and phobias. These individuals also agree with the statement that the sensations and behaviours of anxiety are harmful or dangerous.

Steven Taylor and his colleagues published several variants of the original ASI, seeking to rectify limitations of the original ASI. Given the mounting evidence that anxiety sensitivity was not a unidimensional construct, as originally conceptualized by Reiss, Taylor and colleagues developed the ASI-3 in order to assess the basic dimensions of anxiety sensitivity: (1) fear of physical symptoms, (2) fear of cognitive symptoms, and (3) fear of publicly observable symptoms (Taylor et al., 2007). Each dimension predicts different types of psychopathology (e.g., fear of physical symptoms is most closely associated with panic disorder). The analysis of the dimensions of anxiety sensitivity provides are more nuanced way of examining the relationship between specific types of anxiety sensitivity and specific types of psychopathology.

Reiss (2013) has expanded the concept of a "motivational sensitivity" into a comprehensive theory of human motivation, known as the theory of 16 basic desires, or Reiss Motivation Profile. By definition, a "motivational sensitivity" is an individual difference in valuation of a goal common to everyone and deeply rooted in human nature. Everybody wants to be safe and avoid anxiety, for example, but people with high anxiety sensitivity place a significantly higher value on their safety than does the average person. Reiss's model is based on research on the largest cross-cultural database of human motives ever collected. It identifies 16 motivational sensitivities, one of which is called need for tranquility, which is the same as anxiety sensitivity.
