= Kandinsky–Clérambault syndrome =

- Other names: Syndrome of mental automatism
- Specialty: Psychiatry
- Symptoms: pseudohallucinations, delusions, thought broadcasting, thought insertion

Kandinsky–Clérambault syndrome, also known as the syndrome of mental automatism, is a psychopathological syndrome primarily associated with paranoid schizophrenia. It is characterised by pseudohallucinations, a delusion of being controlled by an external source, telepathy, thought broadcasting, and thought insertion by an external force.

== History ==
Kandinsky–Clérambault syndrome remains relatively obscure in English-speaking countries and is mainly referenced by Russian, French, and German psychiatrists.

The syndrome was independently described by Victor Kandinsky, a Russian psychiatrist, and Gaëtan Gatian de Clérambault, a French psychiatrist. Victor Kandinsky (1849–1889) was the first to document mental automatism based on his own subjective experiences during a psychotic episode. This was detailed in his posthumously published monograph, "On Pseudohallucinations" (Russian: О псевдогаллюцинациях), released in 1890 by his wife, Elizaveta Freimut. Gaëtan Gatian de Clérambault (1872–1934) further developed the concept and introduced the term "mental automatism."

== Mental automatism ==
De Clérambault’s early research in 1909 focused on hallucinations, proposing that the mechanism of mental automatism could be responsible for hallucinatory experiences. He categorised mental automatism into three distinct types:

- Sensory (senestopathic): This type involves unpleasant sensations in internal organs attributed to external influence—delusions of physical influence.
- Motor (kinesthetic): This manifests as the belief that someone else controls one’s movements and actions.
- Sociale (ideatoric or ideoverbal): This involves disturbances in thought processes, such as derailment, loosening of associations, thought blocking, and flight of ideas, along with delusions of influence on mental processes (e.g., thought broadcasting).

All three forms may occur simultaneously, a phenomenon referred to as "triple automatism." This describes a state involving auditory hallucinations that were perceived to be "made by someone else," which he termed pseudohallucinations. Over time, he found the term "pseudohallucinations" confusing and preferred terms such as "hallucinoid," "presentation," "illumination", and "illustration." He defined these experiences as vivid, subjective perceptions that closely resemble real hallucinations, yet lack objective reality. He emphasised that these hallucinations were not simply products of imagination or memory, but were sensory, involuntary, and vivid.
