= Interoceptive exposure =

Cognitive behavioral therapy technique used to treat panic disorder

Interoceptive exposure is a cognitive behavioral therapy technique used in the treatment of panic disorder. It refers to carrying out exercises that bring about the physical sensations of a panic attack, such as hyperventilation and high muscle tension, and in the process removing the patient's conditioned response that the physical sensations will cause an attack to happen.

== Description ==
By removing the fear of a panic attack happening whenever the person is exposed to a stimulus that has become a precursor to the attack, interoceptive exposure lessens the occurrences of attacks in patients who have received treatment. In short, interoceptive exposure seeks to remove the "fear of fear", where the attacks happen because of the fear of actually having an attack. Interoceptive exposure can be contrasted with in vivo exposure, which exposes the person directly to a feared situation. Interoceptive exposure can be used as a means to induce depersonalization and derealization.

== History ==
Behavioral therapy began primarily between 1950 and 1970 by researchers in the United States, United Kingdom, and South Africa. Joseph Wolpe pioneered the method of systematic desensitization, which started the search for fear reduction techniques. Reiss and McNally developed an expectancy model of fear in 1985 based on the concept of "fear of fear," which they called anxiety sensitivity. They were some of the first researchers to begin examining how anxiety sensitivity influences panic disorder. This theory postulates that individuals with high anxiety sensitivity tend to believe that anxiety causes mental illness, leads to heart attacks, or produces more anxiety.

Early experiments in the 1990s yielded mixed results on the effectiveness of interoceptive exposure. Throughout the 21st century, scientists began to create treatment protocol to help those with Panic Disorder. Barlow and Craske (2007) constructed a popular treatment procedure in which therapists use a low dose of IE therapy along with controlled breathing skills. However, scientists still question whether a low-dose IE therapy or a more intensive approach is more effective.

== Specific applications ==
Post traumatic stress disorder and chronic obstructive pulmonary disease, conditions commonly comorbid with Panic Disorder, can be treated using interoceptive exposures. IE has been shown to reduce Anxiety Sensitivity, the main characteristic of those with Panic Disorder, which is also associated with Generalized Anxiety Disorder (GAD) and Social Phobia.

== Post traumatic stress disorder ==
It is postulated that IE helps those with PTSD because many of the exercises serve as reminders of the individual's traumatic experiences. IE creates high anxiety reactions for those with PTSD and reduces their anxiety sensitivity for future encounters to the traumatic event. For example, a spinning exercise could make some individuals remember spinning in their vehicle after being hit. Also, after completing a tension exercise, individuals may remember a time when they were physically hit in some way (e.g. physical assault, recreational accident, road traffic collision). These exercises can make some individuals feel distressed from the recall of trauma.

== Chronic obstructive pulmonary disease ==
Panic disorder has been found to commonly co-occur with chronic obstructive pulmonary disease (COPD). COPD is a serious lung disease that involves restriction of airways from chronic bronchitis and/or emphysema. Research suggests that IE breathing exercises are safe and similar to the existing exercises that are used to help COPD. CBT (cognitive behavioral therapy) is not commonly used to help treat COPD, but recent research has shown that CBT including interoceptive exposures could be extremely beneficial. Specifically, IE extinguishes the learned fear response paired with breathing difficulties and disconfirms the catastrophic cognitions connected with increased physiological arousal.

== Anxiety sensitivity ==
Researchers reported high degrees of anxiety sensitivity in patients with GAD, social phobia, and panic disorder. This led researchers to believe that there may be alternative treatment options involving IE therapy that would benefit these individuals. For example, for those with GAD, caffeine could be administered to make thoughts race and provoke worry about loss of cognitive control. Also individuals with social phobia could induce sweating before doing a speech challenge. Acknowledging these physical symptoms associated with high anxiety may be beneficial in reducing future anxiety when it does occur.

== Implementation differences ==
Treatment manuals for IE are not consistent in how the therapy should be implemented. Despite minimal reports of adverse outcomes due to IE from both patients and therapists, therapists have been cautious when applying interoceptive exposure and have tended to implement it in a less prolonged and intense fashion than treatment manuals suggest.

== See also ==
- Exposure therapy
- Interoception
