= Phobophobia =

Fear of developing or having phobias

Phobophobia is a phobia defined as the fear of phobias, or the fear of fear, including intense anxiety and unrealistic and persistent fear of the somatic sensations and the feared phobia ensuing. Phobophobia can also be defined as the fear of phobias or fear of developing a phobia. Phobophobia is related to anxiety disorders and panic attacks directly linked to other types of phobias, such as agoraphobia. When a patient has developed phobophobia, their condition must be diagnosed and treated as part of anxiety disorders. Commonly stemming from an innate previous or current phobia

Phobophobia is the fear of fear itself: the internal sensations associated with another phobia and anxiety. This binds it closely to other anxiety disorders, especially generalized anxiety disorders and panic attacks. It is a condition in which anxiety disorders are maintained in an extended way, which, combined with the psychological fear generated by phobophobia of encountering the feared phobia, would ultimately lead to the intensifying of the effects of said phobia that the patient might have developed, such as agoraphobia, and specially with it, and making them susceptible to having an extreme fear of panicking. Phobophobia comes in between the stress the patient might be experiencing and the phobia that the patient has developed as well as the effects on their life, or in other words, it is a bridge between anxiety/panic the patient might be experiencing and the type of phobia they fear, creating an intense and extreme predisposition to the feared phobia. Nevertheless, phobophobia is not necessarily developed as part of other phobias, but can be an important factor for maintaining them.

Phobophobia differentiates itself from other kinds of phobias by the fact that there is no environmental stimulus per se, but rather internal dreadful sensations similar to psychological symptoms of panic attacks. The psychological state of the mind creates an anxious response that has itself a conditioned stimuli leading to further anxiety, resulting in a vicious cycle. Phobophobia is a fear experienced before actually experiencing the fear of the feared phobias its somatic sensations that precede it, which is preceded by generalized anxiety disorders and can generate panic attacks. Like all the phobias, the patients avoids the feared phobia in order to avoid the fear of it.

== Cause and symptoms ==
Phobophobia is mainly linked with internal predispositions. It is developed by the unconscious mind which is linked to an event in which phobia was experienced with emotional trauma and stress, which are closely linked to anxiety disorders and by forgetting and recalling the initiating trauma. Phobophobia might develop from other phobias, in which the intense anxiety and panic caused by the phobia might lead to fearing the phobia itself, which triggers phobophobia before actually experiencing the other phobia. The extreme fear towards the other phobia can lead the patient to believe that their condition may develop into something worse, intensifying the effects of the other phobias by fearing it. Also, phobophobia can be developed when anxiety disorders are not treated, creating an extreme predisposition to other phobias. The development of phobophobia can also be attributed to characteristics of the patient itself, such as phylogenetic influence, the prepotency of certain stimuli, individual genetic inheritance, age incidence, sex incidence, personality background, cultural influence inside and outside the family, physiological variables and biochemical factors. Phobophobia shares the symptoms of many other anxiety disorders, more specifically panic attacks and generalized anxiety disorder:

1. Dizziness
2. Heart pounding
3. An excess of perspiration
4. Slight paresthesia
5. Tension
6. Hyperventilation
7. Angst
8. Faintness
9. Avoidance

== Association with generalized anxiety disorder ==
Generalized anxiety disorder is when our minds are troubled about some uncertain event, or in other words, when we feel threatened, although the source of the threat might not be obvious to us. It is a disorder when it happens frequently, and disables people from accomplishing some of their daily activities. Generalized anxiety disorder always comes before phobophobia, and some of its symptoms are listed below:

1. Paleness of skin
2. Sweating
3. Dilation of pupils
4. Rapid pounding of heart
5. Rise in blood pressure
6. Tension in the muscles
7. Trembling
8. Readiness to be startled
9. Dryness and tightness of the throat and mouth
10. Rapid breathing
11. Desperation
12. A sinking feeling in the stomach
13. A strong desire to cry, run or hide

The main problem with this disorder is that we do not know what we are troubled about, which may lead to our desire to escape. Anxiety becomes a disorder only when we experience psychological trauma, in which our knowledge of past events trigger a fear of uncertain danger in the future. In other words, the primarily event is anxiety which arises for no accountable reason, panic might develop from anxiety and the phobophobia is developed in the very end as a consequence of both of them, sharing some of the symptoms. If either of these initiating disorders are not treated, phobophobia can be developed because an extended susceptibility and experience of this feelings can create an extreme predisposition to other phobias. Anxiety is mainly fixed to a certain specific event or specific events, a strong learned drive which is situationally evoked which is stressful to one person but not to another, and this makes it much easier for phobophobia to develop, as well as other phobias.

== Association with panic attacks ==
When people experience panic attacks, they are convinced that they are about to die or suffer some extreme calamity in which some kind of action is done by the individual (such as fleeing or screaming). In case of phobophobia, a panic attack might be encountered as the fear that they will in fact experience the calamities of the feared phobia and see it as something inevitable. Also, the nature of the panic is of profound personal significance to the individual, on a similar way phobophobia is related to the individual. This is why panic attacks are closely related to phobophobia. Nevertheless, they can differentiate themselves by the fact that phobophobia is a psychological fear of the phobia itself that intensifies it, while panic attacks are extreme fear of encountering the calamities of an imminent disaster, and in this particular case, of encountering other phobias, which can be often accompanied by at least four of the following common symptoms of panic attacks:

1. Dyspnea
2. Palpitations
3. Chest pain or discomfort
4. Choking or smothering sensations
5. Vertigo or unsteady feelings
6. Feelings of unreality (depersonalization or derealization)
7. Paresthesias (tingling in hands or feet)
8. Hot and cold flushes
9. Faintness
10. Trembling or shaking
11. Difficult breathing
12. Sweating

Panic attacks can also be accompanied by disturbance in heart action and feelings of desperation and angst. Being closely related, phobophobia and panic attacks, the first one can be treated like a panic attack with psychological therapy. Moreover, in combination with phobophobia, a patient might be more susceptible to believe that their continuing anxiety symptoms will eventually culminate in a much more severe mental disorder, such as schizophrenia.

== Treatment ==
There are many ways to treat phobophobia, and the methods used to treat panic disorders have been shown to be effective to treat phobophobia, because panic disorder patients will present in a similar fashion to conventional phobics and perceive their fear as totally irrational. Also, exposure based techniques have formed the basis of the armamentarium of behaviour therapists in the treatment of phobic disorders for many years, they are the most effective forms of treatment for phobic avoidance behavior. Phobics are treated by exposing them to the stimuli which they specially fear, and in case of phobophobia, it is both the phobia they fear and their own sensations. There are two ways to approach interoceptive exposure on patients:

- Paradoxical intention: This method is especially useful to treat the fear towards the phobophobia and the phobia they fear, as well as some of the sensations the patient fears. This method exposes the patient to the stimuli that causes the fear, which they avoid. The patient is directly exposed to it bringing them to experience the sensations that they fear, as well as the phobia. This exposure based technique helps the doctor by guiding the patient to encounter their fears and overcome them by feeling no danger around them.
- Symptoms artificially produced: This method is very useful to treat the fear towards the sensations encountered when experiencing phobophobia, the main feared stimuli of this anxiety disorder. By ingestion of different chemical agents, such as caffeine, CO_{2}-O_{2} or adrenaline, some of the symptoms the patient feels when encountering phobophobia and other anxiety disorders are triggered, such as hyperventilation, heart pounding, blurring of vision and paresthesia, which can lead to the controlling of the sensations by the patients. At first, panic attacks will be encountered, but eventually, as the study made by Doctor Griez and Van den Hout shows, the patient shows no fear to somatic sensations and panic attacks and eventually of the phobia feared.

Cognitive modification is another method that helps considerably to treat phobophobics. When treating the patients with the method, doctors correct some wrong information the patient might have about his disease, such as their catastrophic beliefs or imminent disaster by the feared phobia. Some doctors have even agreed that this is the most helpful component, since it has shown to be very effective especially if combined with other methods, like interoceptive exposure. The doctor seeks to convince patients that their symptoms do not signify danger or loss of control, for example, if combined with the interoceptive exposure, the doctor can show them that there is no unavoidable calamity and if the patient can keep themselves under control, they learn by themselves that there is no real threat and that it is just in their mind. Cognitive modification also seeks to correct other minor misconceptions, such as the belief that the individual will go crazy and may need to be "locked away forever" or that they will totally lose control and perhaps "run amok". Probably, the most difficult aspect of cognitive restructuring for the majority of the patients will simply be to identify their aberrant beliefs and approach them realistically.

Relaxation and breathing control techniques are used to produce the symptoms naturally. The somatic sensations, the feared stimuli of phobophobia, are sought to be controlled by the patient to reduce the effects of phobophobia. One of the major symptoms encountered is that of hyperventilation, which produce dizziness, faintness, etc. So, hyperventilation is induced in the patients in order to increase their CO_{2} levels that produce some of this symptoms. By teaching the patients to control this sensations by relaxing and controlling the way they breathe, this symptoms can be avoided and reduce phobophobia. This method is useful if combined with other methods, because alone it does not treat other main problems of phobophobia.

== Etymology ==
The word phobophobia is an English adaptation of the Greek φόβος, phobos, "fear". Phobophobia literally translates to "fear of fear".

== See also ==
- Anxiety sensitivity
- First inauguration of Franklin D. Roosevelt, the speech for which contained the line "the only thing we have to fear is fear itself"
