= Kandinsky (disambiguation) =

Kandinsky is a surname. Notable people with the surname include:

- Victor Kandinsky (1849–1889), Russian physician
- Wassily Kandinsky (1866–1944), Russian painter and art theorist

== See also ==
- Bibliothèque Kandinsky
- Kandinsky Prize
