= Ganser syndrome =

Ganser Syndrome
- Specialty: Psychiatry

Ganser syndrome is a rare dissociative disorder characterized by nonsensical or wrong answers to questions and other dissociative symptoms such as fugue, amnesia or conversion disorder, often with visual pseudohallucinations and a decreased state of consciousness. The syndrome has also been called nonsense syndrome, balderdash syndrome, syndrome of approximate answers, hysterical pseudodementia or prison psychosis.

The term prison psychosis is sometimes used because the syndrome occurs most frequently in prison inmates, where it may be seen as an attempt to gain leniency from prison or court officials. Psychological symptoms generally resemble the patient's sense of mental illness rather than any recognized category. The syndrome may occur in persons with other mental disorders such as schizophrenia, depressive disorders, toxic states, paresis, alcohol use disorders and factitious disorders. Ganser syndrome can sometimes be diagnosed as merely malingering, but it is more often defined as a dissociative disorder.

The identification of Ganser syndrome is attributed to German psychiatrist Sigbert Ganser (1853–1931). In 1898, he described the disorder in prisoners awaiting trial in a penal institution in Halle, Germany. He named impaired consciousness and distorted communication, namely in the form of approximate answers (also referred to as Vorbeireden in the literature, German for "to talk past; to have a misunderstanding"), as the defining symptoms of the syndrome. Vorbeireden involves the inability to answer questions precisely, although the content of the questions is understood.

Ganser syndrome is described as a dissociative disorder not otherwise specified (DDNOS) in the DSM-IV, and is not currently listed in the DSM-5. It is a rare and an often overlooked clinical phenomenon. In most cases, it is preceded by extreme stress and followed by amnesia for the period of psychosis. In addition to approximate answers, other symptoms include a clouding of consciousness, somatic conversion disorder symptoms, confusion, stress, loss of personal identity, echolalia, and echopraxia.

== Cause ==
To date, no definitive cause or reason of the disorder has been established. The sources that classify the syndrome as a dissociative disorder or a factitious disorder conflict in their proposed aetiologies. As a result, there are differing theories as to why the syndrome develops.

Ganser syndrome was previously classified as a factitious disorder, explaining the symptoms as mimicking of what patients who do not experience psychosis believe is typical of the experience. However, the DSM-IV placed the syndrome under "Dissociative Disorders Not Otherwise Specified". There has been evidence of a strong correlation between approximate answers and amnesia, suggesting that these have an underlying dissociative mechanism.

Both Ganser's syndrome and the broader category of dissociative disorders have been linked to histories of hysteria, psychosis, conversion, multiple personality and possible feigning. Despite this, the condition's aetiology remains under question due to associations with established psychiatric disorders, as well as organic states.

According to Stern and Whiles (1942), Ganser syndrome is a fundamentally psychotic illness. As evidence, they describe the case of a woman with recurrent mania and a head injury before being submitted to treatment and the report of a man with schizophrenia who suffered from alcoholism and had recently been in prison.

Ganser syndrome is also sometimes referred to as "prison psychosis", emphasizing its prevalence among prisoners, generating discussion about whether the disorder only appears in this population. In a study of prisoners, Estes and New concluded that escaping an intolerable situation, such as being incarcerated, prompted the syndrome's key symptoms. The study touched on the malingering controversy surrounding the syndrome, as well as the stress component that often precedes the disorder.

According to consultant psychiatrist F. A. Whitlock, Ganser syndrome is a hysterical disorder, on par with Ganser's description of the disorder. Whitlock pointed to the number of cases in which Ganser syndrome was reported in settings of organic brain disease or functional psychosis as evidence of its hysterical foundations. Kraepelin and Bumke also believed the syndrome to be of a hysterical nature. Bumke thought the syndrome hysterical because amnesia for a traumatic emotional event tends to occur in hysteria more than in other disorders. The giving of approximate answers is thought to be produced in hysterical personalities.

According to Mayer-Gross and Bleuler, Ganser syndrome occurs mainly in epileptic or schizophrenic patients.

Still others claim that an organic condition that could lead to the manifestation of Ganser syndrome symptoms would have to be at an advanced stage in which a diagnosis could be easily given.

There have also been reports of trauma and stroke patients with the syndrome. A study investigating the neurological basis of Ganser syndrome described a patient with symptoms of the disorder who had a history of stroke and bifrontal infarcts. They discovered that hyperglutamatergic states, which are caused by both strokes and stress, share a relationship with dissociative symptoms, suggesting a possible organic pathology that can predispose individuals to the syndrome. Wirtz and colleagues (2008) described a patient with Ganser syndrome after a left-hemispheric middle cerebral artery infarct. A neuropsychological examination revealed atypical lateralisation of cognitive functions, leading to the conclusion that the giving of approximate answers might be related to frontal-executive cerebral dysfunction.

== Diagnosis ==
Ganser syndrome was listed under Factitious Disorder with Psychological Symptoms in the DSM-III. The criteria of this category emphasized symptoms that cannot be explained by other mental disorders, psychological symptoms under the control of the individual, and the goal of assuming a patient role, not otherwise understandable given their circumstances.

The DSM-IV-TR classified Ganser syndrome as a dissociative disorder defined by the giving of approximate answers to questions (e.g. '2 plus 2 equals 5' when not associated with dissociative amnesia or dissociative fugue). The ICD-10 and DSM-IV do not specify any diagnostic criteria—apart from approximate answers—as a requirement for a Ganser syndrome diagnosis. Most case studies of the syndrome also depend on the presence of approximate answers and at least one of the other symptoms described by Ganser in his original paper. Usually when giving wrong answers, individuals are only slightly off, showing that the individual understood the question For instance, when asked how many legs a horse has, they might say, "five". Although subjects appear confused in their answers, in other respects they appear to understand their surroundings. Amnesia, loss of personal identity, and clouding of consciousness were among the most common symptoms apart from approximate answers.

Although there is currently no uniform way to diagnose the syndrome, a full neurological and mental state examination is recommended to determine its presence as well as tests that assess malingering. In addition to mental examination, other investigations should be done to exclude other underlying causes. These include computer tomography scans (CT) or magnetic resonance imaging (MRI) scans to exclude structural pathology, lumbar puncture to exclude meningitis or encephalitis, and electroencephalography (EEG), to exclude delirium or seizure disorder.

Diagnosing Ganser syndrome is challenging because of its rarity and symptom variability. The manifested symptoms may be dependent on the individual's conception of what mental illness entails, creating the possibility of a wide range of combinations of symptoms present in an individual with Ganser syndrome.

== Treatment ==
In many cases, the symptoms seem to dwindle after a few days, and patients are often left with amnesia for the period of psychosis. Hospitalization may be necessary during the acute phase of symptoms, and psychiatric care if the patient is a danger to self or others. A neurological consult is advised to rule out any organic cause. Psychotherapy may also recommended for ensuring and maintaining safety.

Ganser patients typically recover quickly and completely. Since Ganser syndrome can be a response to psychic deterioration, its resolution may be followed by other psychiatric symptoms, such as schizophrenia and depression, hence the rationale behind the recommendation of psychotherapy. Medication is usually not required.

== Epidemiology ==
Reviewing multiple collections of case studies, the incidence of the disorder is not precisely known. Individuals of multiple backgrounds have been reported as having the disorder. The syndrome was historically thought to be more common in men. However, Whitlock speculates that the higher reported rate of Ganser in men might be due to the greater proportion of men who are incarcerated. It has been most frequently seen in individuals ages 15 to 40 and has also been observed in children. This wide age range is derived from case studies, and therefore may not be an accurate estimate. Ganser syndrome has also been observed in groups other than prison populations.

== Controversy ==
There is controversy regarding whether Ganser syndrome is a valid clinical entity. For example, Bromberg (1986) has argued that the syndrome is not due to or related to mental illness, but rather a sort of defense against legal punishment. Some see it as conscious lying, denial and repression, presenting Ganser syndrome symptoms as malingering instead of a dissociative or factitious disorder.

One case study of Ganser syndrome presented a middle-aged man who had been in a car crash and wanted disability insurance benefits. Since he had a big incentive, psychologists took careful measures and implemented testing with malingering instruments, which showed that the man performed below chance on simple memory tests and claimed to experience non-existent symptoms. Upon further inspection of the collateral information, they found that the patient took part in high-level sports and other activities that were inconsistent with the cognitive dysfunctions he reported, and they determined it to be a case of malingering.

Estes and New (1948) concluded that the motivation for the symptoms of the syndrome was escaping an "intolerable situation". Stern and Whiles proposed an alternative explanation, citing Ganser syndrome presented itself in individuals who, although not psychologically well, do not realize it, and want to appear so. Still others attribute the syndrome to inattention, purposeful evasion, suppression, alcoholic excess, head injury, and to unconscious attempts to deceive others as a means to free themselves from responsibility for their actions. This denial of behaviour can be seen as a way to overcome anxiety and helplessness brought on by the stressful event that often precedes the syndrome.

These aetiological debates focus on the main symptom of Ganser syndrome and its importance in its diagnosis. Approximate answers are prominent in the Ganser syndrome literature, causing concern in those who believe that this is a relatively simple symptom to feign.

Ganser syndrome was regarded as an Adjustment Reaction of Adult Life in the DSM-II and later was moved under the category of Factitious Disorder with Psychological Symptoms in the DSM-III. Ganser syndrome can also be found under the Dissociative Disorder Not Otherwise Specified (DDNOS) section of the DSM-IV-TR, however it is not listed in the DSM-5, which got rid of the DDNOS section and replaced it with Other Specified Dissociative Disorder (OSDD) and Unspecified Dissociative Disorder (USDD). Despite this, the International Classification of Diseases has Ganser syndrome listed under dissociative disorders.

== See also ==
- Paraphasia
