= Erotomania =

Romantic delusional disorder

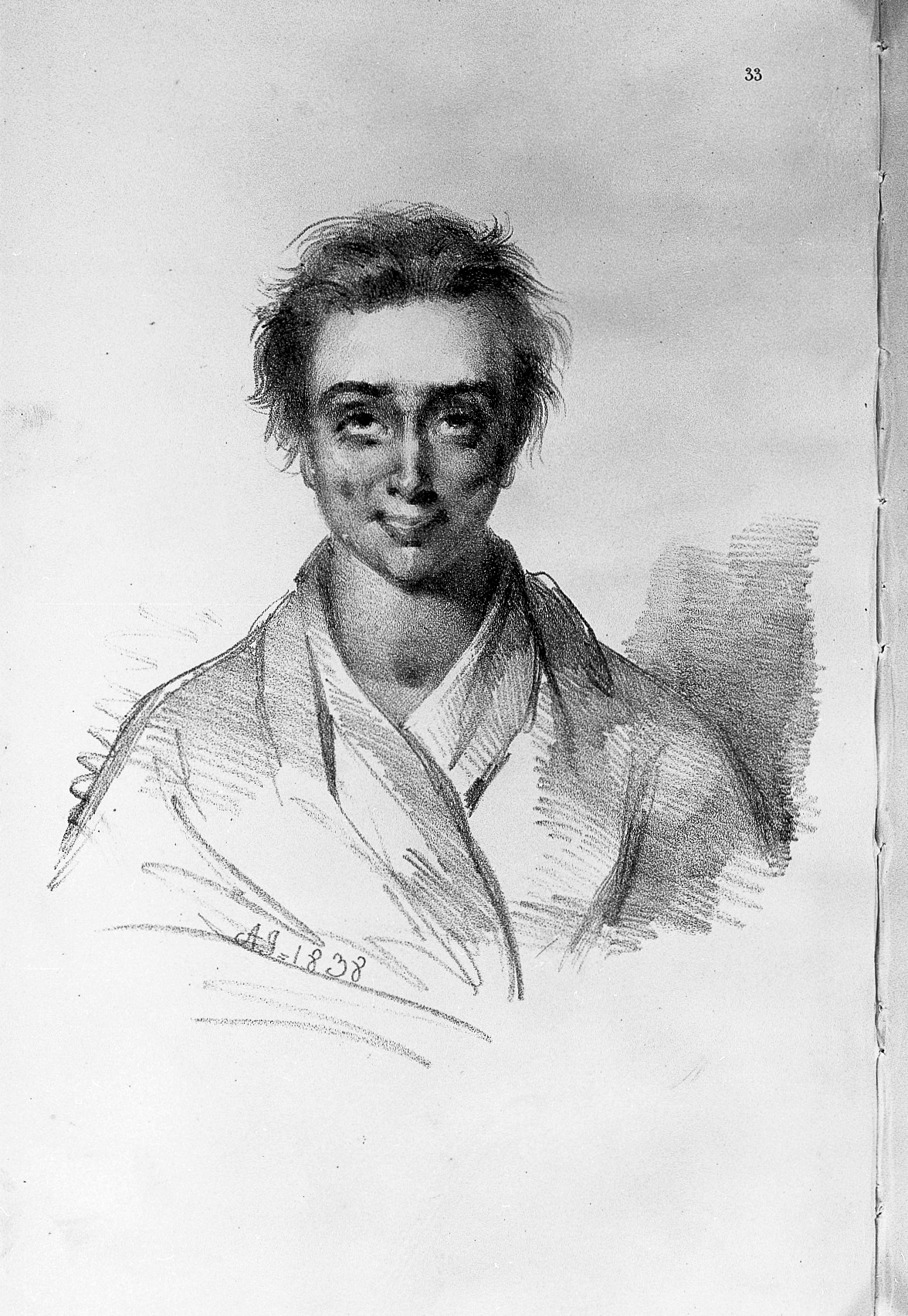
- M.S.P. "Female patient suffering from erotomania", from Alexander Morison's The Physiognomy of Mental Diseases (1843)
- Specialty: Psychiatry
- Symptoms: False attraction
- Duration: Chronic

Erotomania, also known as de Clérambault's syndrome, is an uncommon paranoid condition that is characterized by an individual's delusions of another person being infatuated with them. It is listed in the DSM-5 as a subtype of a delusional disorder. Commonly, the onset of erotomania is sudden, and the course is chronic.

This disorder is most often seen (though not exclusively) in female patients who are shy, dependent, and sexually inexperienced. The object of the delusion is typically a man who is unattainable due to high social or financial status, already being in a relationship, or lack of interest. The object of obsession may be imaginary, deceased, or someone the patient has never met. Delusions of reference are common, as the erotomanic individual often perceives that they are being sent messages from the secret admirer through innocuous events such as seeing license plates from specific regions.

== Symptoms ==
Erotomania is more common in women, but men are more likely to exhibit violent and stalker-like behaviors. The core symptom of erotomania is that the individual holds an unshakable belief that another person is secretly in love with them. In some cases, the person with the condition may believe several people at once are "secret admirers". Most commonly, the individual has delusions of being loved by an unattainable person who is usually an acquaintance or someone the person has never met. They may also experience other types of delusions concurrently with erotomania, such as delusions of reference, wherein the perceived admirer secretly communicates their love by subtle methods such as body posture, arrangement of household objects, colors, numbers, license plates on cars from specific states and other seemingly innocuous acts—or, if the person is a public figure, through clues in the media such as coded social media posts and meaningful clothing choices. Some delusions may be extreme such as the conception, birth, and kidnapping of children that never existed or the belief that the individual was predestined or chosen by God to be with the object of their obsession. The delusional objects may be replaced by others over time, and some may be chronic in fixed forms. Denial is characteristic with this disorder as the patients do not accept the fact that their object of delusion may be married, unavailable, or uninterested. The phantom lover may also be imaginary or deceased.

Erotomania has two forms: primary and secondary. Primary erotomania is also commonly referred to as de Clérambault's syndrome and old maid's insanity and it exists alone without comorbidities, has a sudden onset and a chronic outcome. The secondary form is found along with mental disorders like paranoid schizophrenia, often includes persecutory delusions, hallucinations, and grandiose ideas, and has a more gradual onset. Patients with a "fixed" condition are more seriously ill with constant delusions and are less responsive to treatment. These individuals are usually timid, dependent women that are often sexually or socially inexperienced. In those with a more mild, recurrent condition, delusions are shorter-lived and the disorder can exist undetected by others for years. Problematic behaviors include actions like calling and texting, sending letters and unwanted gifts, persistent Internet harassment via social media and email, making unannounced house visits, contacting or attempting to contact the individual's friends, family or co-workers and other persistent stalking behaviors.

== Cause ==
Erotomania may present as a primary mental disorder, or as a symptom of another psychiatric illness. With secondary erotomania, the erotomanic delusions are due to other mental disorders such as bipolar I disorder or schizophrenia. Symptoms may also be precipitated by alcoholism, substance abuse (including cannabis use) and the use of antidepressants. There may be a potential genetic component involved as family histories of first degree relatives (parents, siblings) with histories of psychiatric disorders and/or dementia are common. The disorder also has behavioral similarities to early onset Alzheimer's disease (mood swings, poor judgement, confusion, hallucinations). Sigmund Freud explained erotomania as a defense mechanism to ward off homosexual impulses which can lead to strong feelings of paranoia, denial, displacement and projection. Similarly, it has been explained as a way to cope with severe loneliness or ego deficit following a major loss. Erotomania may also be linked to unsatiated urges dealing with homosexuality or narcissism. Some research shows brain abnormalities occurring in patients with erotomania such as heightened temporal lobe asymmetry and greater volumes of lateral ventricles than those with no mental disorders.

== Treatment ==
Prognosis differs from person to person, and the ideal treatment is not completely understood. Treatment for this disorder gains the best results when tailored specifically for each individual. To date, the mainline pharmacological treatments have been pimozide (a typical antipsychotic which was also approved for treating Tourette's syndrome), and atypical antipsychotics like risperidone and clozapine. Non-pharmacologic treatments that have shown some degree of efficacy are electroconvulsive therapy (ECT), supportive psychotherapy, family and environment therapy, rehousing, risk management and treating underlying disorders in cases of secondary erotomania. ECT may provide temporary remission of delusional beliefs; antipsychotics help attenuate delusions and reduce agitation or associated dangerous behaviors, and SSRIs may be used to treat secondary depression. In delusional disorder there is some evidence that pimozide has superior efficacy compared with other antipsychotics. Psychosocial psychiatric interventions can enhance the quality of life through allowing some social functioning, and treating comorbid disorders is a priority for secondary erotomania. Family therapy, adjustment of socio-environmental factors, and replacing delusions with something positive may be beneficial to all. In most cases, harsh confrontation should be avoided. Structured risk assessment helps to manage risky behaviors in those individuals more likely to engage in actions that include violence, stalking, and crime. For particularly troublesome cases, neuroleptics and enforced separation may be moderately effective.

== History ==
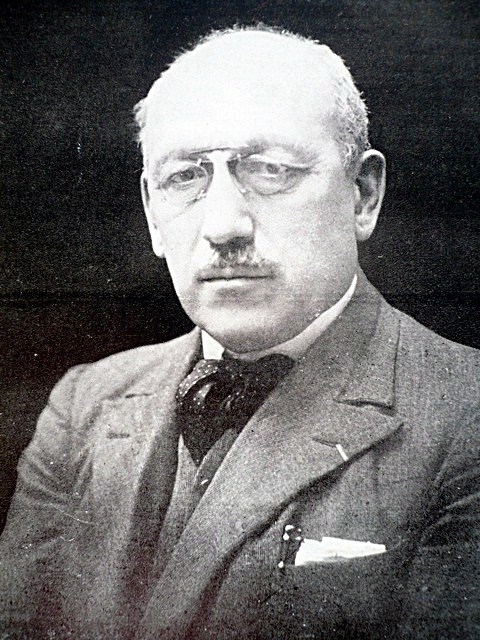
Gaëtan Gatian de Clérambault, French psychiatrist from whom erotomania gets its other name, de Clérambault's syndrome.

Early references to the condition can be found in the work of Hippocrates, Freud (1911), French psychiatrist Gaëtan Gatian de Clérambault (1942), Erasistratus, Plutarch and Galen. Parisian physician, Bartholomy Pardoux (1545–1611) covered the topics of nymphomania and erotomania. In 1623, erotomania was referred to in a treatise by Jacques Ferrand (Maladie d'amour ou Mélancolie érotique) and has been called "erotic paranoia" and "erotic self-referent delusion" until the common usage of the terms erotomania and de Clérambault's syndrome. In 1971 and 1977, M.V. Seeman referred to the disorder as "phantom lover syndrome" and "psychotic erotic transference reaction and delusional loving". Emil Kraepelin and Bernard also wrote of erotomania and more recently, Winokur, Kendler, and Munro have contributed to knowledge on the disorder.

G. E. Berrios and N. Kennedy outlined in "Erotomania: a conceptual history" (2002) several periods of history through which the definition of erotomania has changed considerably:

- Classical times – early eighteenth century: General disease caused by unrequited love
- Early eighteenth-beginning of nineteenth century: Practise of excess physical love (akin to nymphomania or satyriasis)
- Early nineteenth century – beginning twentieth century: Unrequited love as a form of mental disease
- Early twentieth century – present: Delusional belief of "being loved by someone else"

In one case, erotomania was reported in a patient who had undergone surgery for a ruptured cerebral aneurysm.

== Well-known cases ==
In his paper that described the syndrome, de Clérambault referenced a patient he had counselled who was obsessed with British monarch George V. She had stood outside Buckingham Palace for hours at a time, believing that the king was communicating his desire for her by moving the curtains. Parallels were drawn between this and a 2011 case where the body of a homeless American man was found on a secluded island in St James's Park, within sight of Buckingham Palace. The man had sent hundreds of "strange and offensive" packages to Queen Elizabeth II over the previous fifteen years.

The attempted assassination of United States president Ronald Reagan by John Hinckley Jr. has been reported to have been driven by an erotomaniac fixation on actress Jodie Foster, whom Hinckley was attempting to impress.

In November 1996, U.S. Army veteran Gerald Atkins opened fire inside the Wixom Assembly Plant, a Ford manufacturing facility in Wixom, Michigan, where he killed a manager and injured three others believing that Ford was disrupting his relationship with a female employee who barely knew him.

Late-night TV entertainer David Letterman and former astronaut Story Musgrave were both stalked by Margaret Mary Ray, who had erotomania.

Michael David Barrett allegedly had erotomania, stalking ESPN correspondent Erin Andrews across the country, trying to see her and taking lewd videos.

Many cases of obsession or stalking can be linked to erotomania but do not always necessarily go hand in hand.

=== In media ===
- In Black Narcissus (1947) Sister Ruth exhibits erotomania towards Mr Dean
- Girls Town (1959)
- The Exquisite Cadaver (1969)
- Play Misty for Me (1971)
- Fatal Attraction (1987)
- Nurse Betty (2000)
- Perfect Blue (1997)
- A main character in the American TV series Orange Is the New Black, Lorna Morello, exhibits erotomanic behavior towards a man to whom she deludedly believes herself to be engaged
- He Loves Me... He Loves Me Not (2002)
- A 2011 episode (season 5, episode 3) of the British TV series Lewis features a character with erotomania, referred to in the show as de Clérambault's syndrome
- Enduring Love (1997)
- Criminal Minds – season 1, episode 5: "Broken Mirror"
- Criminal Minds – season 1, episode 18: "Somebody's Watching"
- Doc Martin – season 6, episode 3: "The Tameness of a Wolf"
- Law & Order – season 3, episode 18: "Animal Instinct"
- Wire in the Blood - season 3, episode 3: "Nothing But the Night"
- A 2019 episode (season 1, episode 2) of the British-Austrian series Vienna Blood features a character who displays symptoms of de Clérambault's syndrome (although correctly not described as such, since the programme is set in 1907, 14 years before de Clérambault himself described the syndrome)
- Chance (2016) the main character, Dr Eldon Chance was diagnosed with delusional erotomania as a young resident.
- You (2018) Joe Goldberg experiences erotomania in most of his interactions with women he meets for the first time
- Erotomaniac (2022) an animated horror film about erotomania
- The Brokenwood Mysteries – series 10, episode 4: "Love You to Death"

== See also ==
- Adèle Hugo – Youngest child of Victor Hugo (1830–1915)
- Case of Aimée – 1932 French doctoral thesis used to argue the theory of self-punishing paranoia
- Delusion – Fixation of holding false beliefs
- Limerence – Love madness or intense infatuation
- Love addiction – Proposed disorder of problematic passion & distress
- Monomania – Mental illness involving an unhealthily intense obsession with one specific thing
- Obsessive love – Possessiveness and inability to accept rejection
- Schizophrenia – Mental disorder with psychotic symptoms
- Stalking – Unwanted observation
