= Depersonalization =

Anomaly of self-awareness

In psychiatry, depersonalization is a dissociative phenomenon characterized by a subjective feeling of detachment from oneself, manifesting as a sense of disconnection from one's thoughts, emotions, sensations, or actions, and often accompanied by a feeling of observing oneself from an external perspective. Those affected often feel as though they are observing the world from a distance, as if separated by a barrier "behind glass". They maintain insight into the subjective nature of their experience, recognizing that it pertains to their own perception rather than altering objective reality. This distinction between subjective experience and objective reality distinguishes depersonalization from delusions, where individuals firmly believe in false perceptions as genuine truths. Depersonalization is also distinct from derealization, which involves a sense of detachment from the external world rather than from oneself.

Chronic depersonalization is often associated with depersonalization derealization disorder (DPDR), which is classified by the DSM-5 as a dissociative disorder, based on the findings that depersonalization and derealization are prevalent in other dissociative disorders including dissociative identity disorder.

Though degrees of depersonalization can happen to anyone subject to temporary anxiety or stress, chronic depersonalization is more related to individuals who have experienced a severe trauma or prolonged stress/anxiety. Both depersonalization and derealization are important symptoms in the spectrum of dissociative disorders, including dissociative identity disorder and "dissociative disorder not otherwise specified" (DD-NOS). They are also prominent symptoms in some other non-dissociative disorders, such as anxiety disorders, clinical depression, bipolar disorder, schizophrenia, schizoid personality disorder, hypothyroidism, endocrine disorders, schizotypal personality disorder, borderline personality disorder, obsessive–compulsive disorder, migraines, and sleep deprivation; they can also be symptoms of some types of neurological seizure, and it has been suggested that there could be common aetiology between depersonalization symptoms and panic disorder, on the basis of their high co-occurrence rates.

In social psychology, and in particular self-categorization theory, the term depersonalization has a different meaning and refers to "the stereotypical perception of the self as an example of some defining social category".

== Description ==
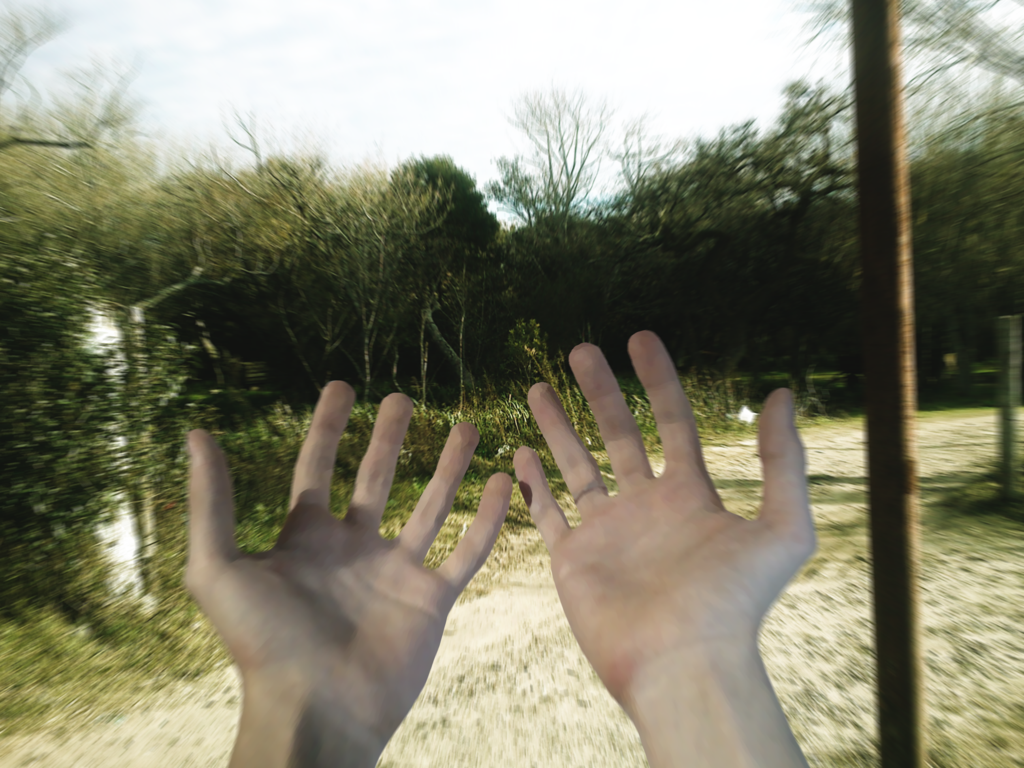
An attempt at a visual representation of depersonalization

Individuals who experience depersonalization feel divorced from their own personal self by sensing their body sensations, feelings, emotions, behaviors, etc. as not belonging to the same person or identity. Often a person who has experienced depersonalization claims that things seem unreal or hazy. Also, a recognition of a self breaks down (hence the name). Depersonalization can result in very high anxiety levels, which further increase these perceptions.

Depersonalization is a subjective experience of unreality in oneself, while derealization is unreality of the outside world. Although most authors currently regard depersonalization (personal/self) and derealization (reality/surroundings) as independent constructs, many do not want to separate derealization from depersonalization.

== History ==
In 1904, Sigmund Freud described his own experience of depersonalization at the Athens' Acropolis. He described the incident 32 years later, in 1936. He interpreted his experience as an unconscious psychological defense, in which he was repressing feelings of guilt for outliving his father, whose cause of death remained unknown.

In his case study of the Wolf Man, Freud emphasized that depersonalization and derealization serve psychologically defensive functions. A young Russian man known as the "Wolf Man" experienced derealization, which is the sensation of being separated from his surroundings by a veil. This description of being separated from one's surroundings by a veil is reminiscent of derealization. This symptom was accompanied by fear of wolves. Freud's case description revolves around the man's dream of white wolves in a tree peering at him through an open window.

== Epidemiology ==
Despite the distressing nature of symptoms, estimating the prevalence rates of depersonalization is challenging due to inconsistent definitions and variable timeframes.

Depersonalization can be a symptom of anxiety disorders, specifically panic disorder. It can also accompany sleep deprivation (often occurring when experiencing jet lag), migraine, epilepsy (especially temporal lobe epilepsy, complex-partial seizure, both as part of the aura and during the seizure), obsessive-compulsive disorder, severe stress or trauma, anxiety, the use of recreational drugs—especially cannabis, hallucinogens, ketamine, and MDMA, certain types of meditation, deep hypnosis, extended mirror or crystal gazing, sensory deprivation, and mild-to-moderate head injury with little or full loss of consciousness (less likely if unconscious for more than 30 minutes). Interoceptive exposure is a non-pharmacological method that can be used to induce depersonalization.

In the general population, transient depersonalization and derealization are common, having a lifetime prevalence between 26 and 74%. A random community-based survey of 1,000 adults in the US rural south found a 1-year depersonalization prevalence rate at 19%. Standardized diagnostic interviews have reported prevalence rates of 1.2% to 1.7% over one month in UK samples, and a rate of 2.4% in a single-point Canadian sample. In clinical populations, prevalence rates range from 1% to 16%, with varying rates in specific psychiatric disorders such as panic disorder and unipolar depression. Co-occurrence between depersonalization/derealization and panic disorder is common, suggesting a possible common etiology.

Depersonalization is reported 2–4 times more in women than in men, but depersonalization/derealization disorder is diagnosed approximately equally across men and women, with symptoms typically emerging in adolescence.

A similar and overlapping concept called ipseity disturbance (ipse is Latin for "self" or "itself") may be part of the core process of schizophrenia spectrum disorders. However, specific to the schizophrenia spectrum seems to be "a dislocation of first-person perspective such that self and other or self and world may seem to be non-distinguishable, or in which the individual self or field of consciousness takes on an inordinate significance in relation to the objective or intersubjective world" (emphasis in original).

For the purposes of evaluation and measurement, depersonalization can be conceived of as a construct and scales are now available to map its dimensions in frequency and duration. A study of undergraduate students found that individuals high on the depersonalization/derealization subscale of the Dissociative Experiences Scale exhibited a more pronounced cortisol response in stress. Individuals high on the absorption subscale, which measures a subject's experiences of concentration to the exclusion of awareness of other events, showed weaker cortisol responses.

== Causes ==
A case-control study conducted at a specialized depersonalization clinic included 164 individuals with chronic depersonalization symptoms, of which 40 linked their symptoms to illicit drug use. Phenomenological similarity between drug-induced and non-drug groups was observed, and comparison with matched controls further supported the lack of distinction. The severity of clinical depersonalization symptoms remains consistent regardless of whether they are triggered by illicit drugs or psychological factors.

=== Pharmacological ===
Depersonalization has been described by some as a desirable state, particularly by those who have experienced it under the influence of mood-altering recreational drugs. It is an effect of dissociatives and psychedelics, as well as a possible side effect of caffeine, alcohol, amphetamine, cannabis, and antidepressants. It is a classic withdrawal symptom from many drugs.

Benzodiazepine dependence, which can occur with long-term use of benzodiazepines, can induce chronic depersonalization symptomatology and perceptual disturbances in some people, even in those who are taking a stable daily dosage, and it can also become a protracted feature of the benzodiazepine withdrawal syndrome.

Lieutenant Colonel Dave Grossman, in his book On Killing, suggests that military training artificially creates depersonalization in soldiers, suppressing empathy and making it easier for them to kill other human beings.

Graham Reed (1974) claimed that depersonalization occurs in relation to the experience of falling in love.

=== Situational ===
Experiences of depersonalization/derealization occur on a continuum, ranging from momentary episodes in healthy individuals under conditions of stress, fatigue, or drug use, to severe and chronic disorders that can persist for decades. Several studies found that over 60% of individuals in life-threatening accidents report at least transient depersonalization during or immediately after the accidents. A significant portion of those with mild to moderate head injury experience significant depersonalization and derealization. Military studies have found that depersonalization can be invoked by stress and fatigue, and that depersonalization can interfere with performance.

=== Biological ===
Studies have linked dysregulation of the immune system with depersonalisation. Researchers compared protein expression in serum samples of individuals with depersonalisation-derealization disorder (DPDR) and healthy controls, and found that many key proteins involved in maintaining homeostasis were present at altered levels. Decreased levels of C-reactive protein (CRP), complement C1q subcomponent subunit B, and apolipoprotein A-IV, and increased levels of alpha-1-antichymotrypsin (SERPINA3) were observed in patients with DPDR. Furthermore, expressions of CRP and SERPINA3 were found to be linked with the ability to inhibit cognitive interference of DPDR.

== Psychobiological mechanisms ==
=== Proximate mechanism ===
Depersonalization involves disruptions in the integration of interoceptive and exteroceptive signals, particularly in response to acute anxiety or trauma-related events. Studies have highlighted abnormalities in primary somatosensory cortex processing and insula activity as contributing factors to depersonalization experiences. Additionally, abnormal EEG activities, notably in the theta band, suggest potential biomarkers for emotion processing, attention, and working memory. Reduced brain activities in sensory processing units, along with alterations in visceral signal processing regions, are observed, particularly in the early stages of information processing. Furthermore, vestibular signal processing, crucial for balance and spatial orientation, is increasingly recognized as a factor contributing to feelings of disembodiment during depersonalization experiences. Brain imaging studies have revealed alterations in metabolic activity in the sensory association cortex, prefrontal hyperactivation, and limbic inhibition in response to aversive stimuli.

Neurochemically, potential involvement of serotonergic, endogenous opioid, and glutamatergic NMDA pathways has also been proposed.

=== Ultimate mechanism ===
Depersonalization is a classic response to acute trauma, and may be highly prevalent in individuals involved in different traumatic situations including motor vehicle collision and imprisonment.

Psychologically depersonalization can, just like dissociation in general, be considered a type of coping mechanism, used to decrease the intensity of unpleasant experience, whether that is something as mild as stress or something as severe as chronically high anxiety and post-traumatic stress disorder.

The decrease in anxiety and psychobiological hyperarousal helps preserve adaptive behaviors and resources under threat or danger.

Depersonalization is an overgeneralized reaction in that it does not diminish just the unpleasant experience, but more or less all experience – leading to a feeling of being detached from the world and experiencing it more blandly. An important distinction must be made between depersonalization as a mild, short-term reaction to unpleasant experience and depersonalization as a chronic symptom stemming from a severe mental disorder such as PTSD or dissociative identity disorder.

Chronic symptoms may represent persistence of depersonalization beyond the situations under threat.

== Treatment ==
Treatment is dependent on the underlying cause, whether it is organic or psychological in origin. If depersonalization is a symptom of neurological disease, then diagnosis and treatment of the specific disease is the first approach. Depersonalization can be a cognitive symptom of such diseases as amyotrophic lateral sclerosis, Alzheimer's disease, multiple sclerosis (MS), or any other neurological disease affecting the brain. For those with both depersonalization and migraine, tricyclic antidepressants are often prescribed.

If depersonalization is a symptom of psychological causes such as developmental trauma, treatment depends on the diagnosis. In cases of dissociative identity disorder or other dissociative disorders in which extreme developmental trauma interferes with formation of a single cohesive identity, treatment requires proper psychotherapy. Depersonalization can also be a symptom of borderline personality disorder, which can be treated in the long term with proper psychotherapy and psychopharmacology.

The treatment of chronic depersonalization is considered in depersonalization derealization disorder.

A 2001 Russian study showed that naloxone, a drug used to reverse the intoxicating effects of opioid drugs, can successfully treat depersonalization disorder. According to the study: "In three of 14 patients, depersonalization symptoms disappeared entirely and seven patients showed a marked improvement. The therapeutic effect of naloxone provides evidence for the role of the endogenous opioid system in the pathogenesis of depersonalization." The anticonvulsant drug lamotrigine has shown some success in treating symptoms of depersonalization, often in combination with a selective serotonin reuptake inhibitor and is the first drug of choice at the depersonalisation research unit at King's College London.

== Research directions ==
The Depersonalisation Research Unit at the Institute of Psychiatry, Psychology and Neuroscience in London conducts research into depersonalization disorder. Researchers there use the acronym DPAFU (Depersonalisation and Feelings of Unreality) as a shortened label for the disorder.

In a 2020 article in the journal Nature, Vesuna, et al. describe experimental findings which show that layer 5 of the retrosplenial cortex is likely responsible for dissociative states of consciousness in mammals.

== See also ==
- Alienation
- Brain fog
- Catatonic state
- Cognition
- Derealization
- Ego death
- Falling (sensation)
- Hallucinogen persisting perception disorder
- Human spirit
- Nina Searl
- Out-of-body experience
- Post-assault treatment of sexual assault victims
- Psychedelic experience
- Social identity complexity
- Śūnyatā
- Spiritual crisis
- Weltschmerz
- Xenomelia
