= Richard McNally =

American psychologist (born 1954)

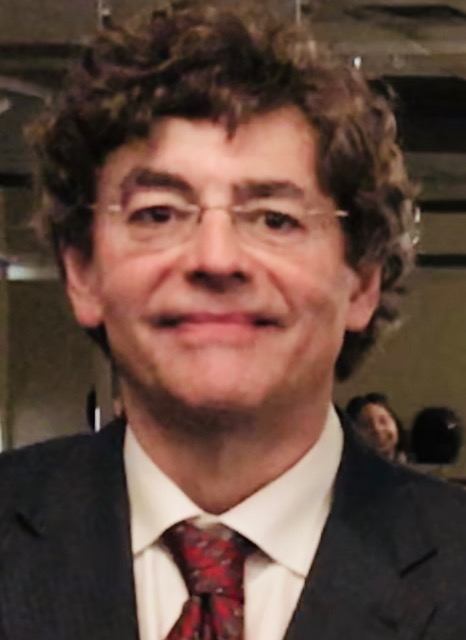
- Born: April 17, 1954 (age 72); Detroit, Michigan, U.S.
- Education: Wayne State University (BS); University of Illinois at Chicago (PhD)
- Known for: Research into anxiety disorders
- Scientific career
- Fields: Psychology Pathology Psychopathology
- Workplaces: Harvard University

Richard J. McNally (born April 17, 1954) is an American psychologist and director of clinical training at Harvard University's department of psychology. As a clinical psychologist and experimental psycho-pathologist, McNally studies anxiety disorders and related syndromes, such as post-traumatic stress disorder, obsessive–compulsive disorder, and complicated grief.

== Biography ==
McNally was born April 17, 1954, in Detroit, Michigan. McNally attended Edsel Ford High School and graduated in 1972. After graduating, he pursued a degree in journalism at Henry Ford Community College in Dearborn, Michigan. He later transferred to Wayne State University in his hometown of Detroit to study psychology.

He received his B.S. in psychology from Wayne State University in 1976, and his Ph.D. in clinical psychology from the University of Illinois at Chicago in 1982. While studying, he was mentored by Steven Reiss.

McNally received his clinical internship and postdoctoral fellowship at Temple University's behavioral therapy unit. McNally's clinical and research mentor was fellow University of Illinois alumni Edna B. Foa. He also received clinical supervision from Ford fellowship recipient Joseph Wolpe. In 1984, he was appointed as an assistant professor in the department of psychology at the University of Health Sciences/the Chicago Medical School, where he established the Anxiety Disorders Clinic and directed the university counseling center. In 1991, he took a new position at the department of psychology of Harvard University, where he currently serves as a professor and director of clinical training.

McNally is a licensed clinical psychologist, a fellow of the Association for Psychological Science and the Association for Behavioral and Cognitive Therapies, winner of the 2005 Distinguished Scientist Award from the Society for the Science of Clinical Psychology, and the winner of the 2010 Outstanding Mentor Award from the Association for Behavioral and Cognitive Therapies.

He has been an associate editor for the journal Behavior Therapy, and has served on the editorial boards of Clinical Psychology Review, Journal of Anxiety Disorders, Behavior Research and Therapy, Journal of Abnormal Psychology, and Psychological Science. McNally also served on the specific phobia and post-traumatic stress disorder committees of the DSM-IV task force. McNally is on the Institute for Scientific Information's "highly cited" list for psychology and psychiatry (top 0.5% of authors worldwide in terms of citation impact).

McNally has over 430 publications, most concerning anxiety disorders, including the books Panic Disorder: A Critical Analysis (1994), Remembering Trauma (2003), and What is Mental Illness? (2011). He has also conducted laboratory studies concerning cognitive functioning in adults reporting histories of childhood sexual abuse (including those reporting recovered memories of abuse). Based upon his research on the controversial topic of recovered memories of childhood sexual abuse in adulthood, he concluded that there is no scientifically convincing evidence that people can repress or dissociate memories of truly traumatic events that they have experienced. A recent research emphasis is the application of network analysis to the understanding of psychopathology.

== Research ==
McNally's early research revolved much around psycho-physiological experiments involving Pavlovian fear conditioning tests of the preparedness theory of phobias. This work fostered the reformulation of central ideas concerning the evolutionary background of specific phobias.

A second early emphasis concerned conceptual, empirical, and psychometric work on the Anxiety Sensitivity Index (ASI), a dispositional measure of the fear of anxiety-related symptoms. Anxiety sensitivity is a risk factor for panic disorder and related syndromes.

McNally was among the first investigators to apply information-processing paradigms to elucidate biases in attention, memory, and interpretation in patients with panic disorder, obsessive-compulsive disorder, and PTSD. More recent work concerns social anxiety disorder and complicated grief, including experiments designed to attenuate cognitive biases in people with social anxiety.

Other publications on various controversies concern the epidemiology of PTSD, psychological debriefing following trauma recovered memories of childhood sexual abuse, cognitive and psychophysiology studies on people reporting having been abducted by space aliens or claiming to have memories from their “past lives”, and research on the emotional impact of “trigger warnings” akin to those increasingly common in academia.

Current research includes network analytic studies on psychopathology, including PTSD, OCD, social anxiety disorder, complicated grief, rumination, and post-traumatic growth.

== Publications ==
- McNally, R. J., & Reiss, S. (1984). The preparedness theory of phobias: The effects of initial fear level on safety-signal conditioning to fear-relevant stimuli. Psychophysiology, 21, 647–652.
- McNally, R. J. (1987). Preparedness and phobias: A review. Psychological Bulletin, 101, 283–303.
- McNally, R. J. (2016). The legacy of Seligman's (1971) Phobias and Preparedness. Behavior Therapy, 47, 585–594.
- Reiss, S., & McNally, R. J. (1985). Expectancy model of fear. In S. Reiss & R. R. Bootzin (Eds.) Theoretical issues in behavior therapy, (pp. 107–121). New York: Academic Press.
- Reiss, S., Peterson, R. A., Gursky, D. M., & McNally, R. J. (1986). Anxiety sensitivity, anxiety frequency and the prediction of fearfulness. Behaviour Research and Therapy, 24, 1–8.
- McNally, R. J., & Eke, M. (1996). Anxiety sensitivity, suffocation fear, and breath-holding duration as predictors of response to carbon dioxide challenge. Journal of Abnormal Psychology, 105, 146–149.
- McNally, R. J. (2002). Anxiety sensitivity and panic disorder. Biological Psychiatry, 52, 938–946.
- McNally, R. J., Foa, E. B., & Donnell, C. D. (1989). Memory bias for anxiety information in patients with panic disorder. Cognition and Emotion, 3, 27–44.
- Foa, E. B., & McNally, R. J. (1986). Sensitivity to feared stimuli in obsessive-compulsives: A dichotic listening analysis. Cognitive Therapy and Research, 10, 477–485.
- McNally, R. J., Kaspi, S. P., Riemann, B. C., & Zeitlin, S. B. (1990). Selective processing of threat cues in posttraumatic stress disorder. Journal of Abnormal Psychology, 99, 398–402.
- Hezel, D. M., & McNally, R. J. (2014). Theory of mind: Impairments in social anxiety disorder. Behavior Therapy, 45, 530–540.
- Robinaugh, D. J., & McNally, R. J. (2013). Remembering the past and envisioning the future in bereaved adults with and without complicated grief. Clinical Psychological Science, 1, 290–300.
- McNally, R. J., Enock, P. E., Tsai, C., & Tousian, M. (2013). Attention bias modification for reducing speech anxiety. Behaviour Research and Therapy, 51, 882–888.
- Enock, P. M., Hofmann, S. G., & McNally, R. J. (2014). Attention bias modification training via smartphone to reduce social anxiety: A randomized, controlled, multi-session experiment. Cognitive Therapy and Research, 38, 200–216.
- McNally, R. J. (2007). Revisiting Dohrenwend et al.’s revisit of the National Vietnam Veterans Readjustment Study. Journal of Traumatic Stress, 20, 481–486.
- McNally, R. J. (2012). Are we winning the war against posttraumatic stress disorder? Science, 336, 872–874.
- McNally, R. J., & Frueh, B. C. (2013). Why are Iraq and Afghanistan war veterans seeking PTSD disability compensation at unprecedented rates? Journal of Anxiety Disorders, 27, 520–526.
- McNally, R. J., Bryant, R. A., & Ehlers, A. (2003). Does early psychological intervention promote recovery from posttraumatic stress? Psychological Science in the Public Interest, 4, 45–79.
- McNally, R. J., Clancy, S. A., Barrett, H. M., & Parker, H. A. (2004). Inhibiting retrieval of trauma cues in adults reporting histories of childhood sexual abuse. Cognition and Emotion, 18, 479–493.
- McNally, R. J., Ristuccia, C. S., & Perlman, C. A. (2005). Forgetting of trauma cues in adults reporting continuous or recovered memories of childhood sexual abuse. Psychological Science, 16, 336–340.
- Clancy, S. A., McNally, R. J., Schacter, D. L., Lenzenweger, M. F., & Pitman, R. K. (2002). Memory distortion in people reporting abduction by aliens. Journal of Abnormal Psychology, 111, 455–461.
- McNally, R. J., Lasko, N. B., Clancy, S. A., Macklin, M. L., Pitman, R. K., & Orr, S. P. (2004). Psychophysiological responding during script-driven imagery in people reporting abduction by space aliens. Psychological Science, 15, 493–497.
- Meyersburg, C. A., Carson, S. H. Mathis, M. B., & McNally, R. J. (2014). Creative histories: Memories of past lives and measures of creativity. Psychology of Consciousness: Theory, Research, and Practice, 1, 70–81.
- McNally, R. J. (2014). Hazards ahead: Five studies you should read before you deploy a trigger warning. Pacific Standard: The Science of Society, 7(4), 16–17.
- Bellet, B. W., Jones, P. J., & McNally, R. J. (2018). Trigger warning: Empirical evidence ahead. Journal of Behavior Therapy and Experimental Psychiatry, 61, 134–141.
- McNally, R. J. (2016). Can network analysis transform psychopathology? Behaviour Research and Therapy, 86, 95–104.
- McNally, R. J., Robinaugh, D. J., Wu, G. W. Y., Wang, L., Deserno, M., & Borsboom, D. (2015). Mental disorders as causal systems: A network approach to posttraumatic stress disorder. Clinical Psychological Science, 3, 836–849.
- McNally, R. J., Mair, P., Mugno, B. L., & Riemann, B. C. (2017). Comorbid obsessive-compulsive disorder and depression: A Bayesian network approach. Psychological Medicine, 47, 1204–1214.
- Heeren, A., Jones, P. J., & McNally, R. J. (2018). Mapping network connectivity among symptoms of social anxiety disorder and comorbid depression in people with social anxiety disorder. Journal of Affective Disorders, 228, 75–82.
- Robinaugh, D. J., LeBlanc, N. J., Vuletich, H. A., & McNally, R. J. (2014). Network analysis of persistent complex bereavement disorder in conjugally bereaved adults. Journal of Abnormal Psychology, 123, 510–522.
- Bernstein, E. E., Heeren, A., & McNally, R. J. (2017). Unpacking rumination and executive control: A network perspective. Clinical Psychological Science, 5, 816–826.
- Bellet, B. W., Jones, P. J., Neimeyer, R. A., & McNally, R. J. (2018). Bereavement outcomes as causal systems: A network analysis of the co-occurrence of complicated grief and posttraumatic growth. Clinical Psychological Science, 6, 797-809.

=== Books ===
- Panic Disorder: A Critical Analysis. McNally RJ (1994). New York: Guilford Press.
- Remembering trauma. McNally RJ (2003). Cambridge, MA: Belknap Press/Harvard University Press.
- What is mental illness?. McNally RJ (2011). Cambridge, MA: The Belknap Press of Harvard University Press.
