= Pseudohallucination =

Hallucination recognised as unreal by patient

A pseudohallucination (from Ancient Greek: ψευδής (pseudḗs) 'false, lying' + hallucination) is an involuntary sensory experience that is vivid enough to be perceived as a hallucination, but is recognised by the individual as subjective and lacking objective reality.

== History ==
The concept of pseudohallucination has evolved over time, with its interpretation varying throughout its historical development.

The term "pseudohallucination" appears to have been coined by German psychiatrist Friedrich Wilhelm Hagen. Hagen published his 1868 book Zur Theorie der Halluzination, to define them as "illusions or sensory errors". The term was further explored by the Russian psychiatrist Victor Kandinsky (1849–1889). In his work On Pseudohallucinations (Russian: О псевдогаллюцинациях, romanized: O psevdogallûcinaciâh), Kandinsky described his psychotic experiences, defining pseudohallucinations as "subjective perceptions similar to hallucinations in terms of their character and vividness, but distinct from true hallucinations as they lack objective reality." As an example of pseudohallucinations, Kandinsky cited hypnagogic hallucinations that occur in healthy individuals just before falling asleep. Karl Jaspers further developed Kandinsky's ideas, emphasizing the "inner subjective space" as the locus of these experiences, where vivid sensory images occurred spontaneously but were devoid of the external reality attributed to hallucinations. Similarly, Eugen Bleuler conceptualized pseudohallucinations as perceptions marked by full sensory clarity and internal localization, while retaining intact reality testing. A common theme in these early perspectives was the differentiation of pseudohallucinations from hallucinations based on their subjective, internal nature and absence of sensory realness.

The relevance of pseudohallucinations in contemporary psychiatry has grown with the establishment of initiatives like the Hearing Voices Network.

== Definitions ==
The term "pseudohallucination" encompasses two primary conceptual uses.

Firstly, pseudohallucinations refer to perceptions that are experienced as arising from within the mind, rather than from external stimuli. These experiences are not tied to the boundaries of external reality, but are internal and perceived as distinct from objective reality. For example, auditory pseudohallucinations may involve hearing voices that are perceived as alien or attributed to other beings, but are acknowledged by the individual as originating from within the mind rather than from an external source.

Secondly, pseudohallucinations are also used to describe hallucinatory experiences where the individual experiences doubt regarding their reality. This second category, more accurately described as partial hallucination, mirrors the concept of partial delusion.

The term is not widely used in the psychiatric and medical fields, as it is considered ambiguous; the term nonpsychotic hallucination is preferred. Pseudohallucinations are more likely to happen with a hallucinogenic drug. However, the current understanding of pseudohallucinations is largely based on the work of Karl Jaspers.

A further distinction is made between pseudohallucinations and parahallucinations, the latter being a result of damage to the peripheral nervous system.

== Competing definitions ==
Several reviews have been conducted that concluded, as recently as the first decade of the 21st century, practitioners were using the term pseudohallucination in inconsistent ways. Some of the competing definitions were precise but completely disagreed which aspects of hallucination were included. The authors of these reviews have generally tried to remedy the situation by proposing either new definitions or new terminology.

Authors, such as Feras Ali Mustafa, have argued use of the term pseudohallucination should be discontinued entirely, as the public can misinterpret it to mean some patient's symptoms are less "real" than others.

== Disorders ==
Pseudohallucinations may be considered a symptom of conversion disorder in DSM-IV (2000), though this definition was removed in DSM-5 (2013). Pseudohallucinations can also occur in individuals with visual loss, a condition known as Charles Bonnet syndrome.

In psychiatry, pseudohallucinations are often described as perceptual disturbances with preserved insight and intact reality testing. Patients generally recognize the perceptual experiences as internal and unreal, whereas true psychotic hallucinations are perceived as indistinguishable from external reality.

Commonly associated conditions include:

- Dissociative disorders
  - Dissociative identity disorder (DID)
  - Other specified or unspecified dissociative disorder
  - Depersonalization-derealization disorder (DPDR)
  - Ganser syndrome
- Severe anxiety disorders
  - Post-traumatic stress disorder (PTSD)
  - Obsessive–compulsive disorder (OCD)
  - Panic disorder
- Certain personality disorders
  - Borderline personality disorder (BPD)
  - Schizotypal personality disorder (STPD)

== See also ==
- Anomalous experiences
- Auditory hallucination
- Hyperphantasia
- Illusion
- Lucid dream
- Phosphene
