= Gaëtan Gatian de Clérambault =

French psychiatrist

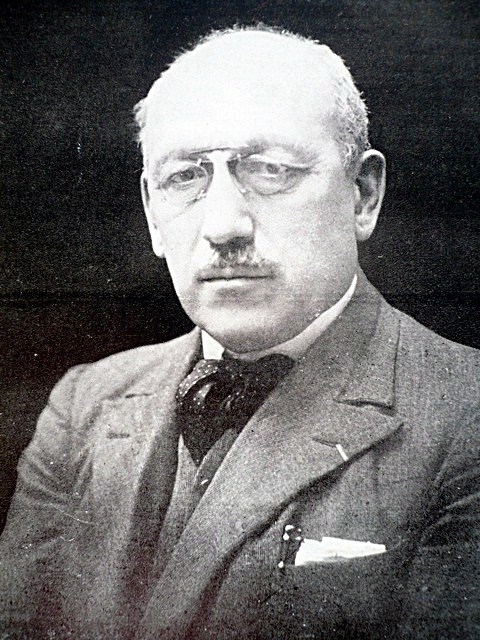
- Gaëtan Gatian de Clérambault
- Born: Gaëtan Henri Alfred Edouard Léon Marie Gatian de Clérambault; 2 July 1872; Bourges, France
- Died: 17 November 1934 (aged 62); Malakoff, France
- Education: École nationale supérieure des arts décoratifs
- Occupation: psychiatry
- Known for: de Clérambault's syndrome, Kandinsky-Clérambault syndrome, mental automatism

Gaëtan Henri Alfred Edouard Léon Marie Gatian de Clérambault (French pronunciation: [ɡaɛtɑ̃ ɑ̃ʁi alfʁɛd edwaʁ leɔ̃ maʁi ɡatjɑ̃ də kleʁɑ̃bo]; 2 July 1872 – 17 November 1934) was a French psychiatrist.

Apart from his psychiatric studies, he was an acclaimed painter and wrote on the costumes of various native tribes. He was also a professional photographer; from 1914 to 1918 he took around 30,000 photographs. Some of the photos were taken as part of a research project involving symptoms of hysteria. Many of his photos were later placed in the Musée de l'Homme.

== Career ==
De Clérambault gained his thesis in 1899, later becoming an assistant physician at the special infirmary for the insane, Préfecture de Police (1905). From 1920 onward, he was head of this institution.

For a period of time, Clérambault conducted classes on the art of draped costumes at the École nationale supérieure des Beaux-Arts in Paris.

He is credited with introducing the term "psychological (mental) automatism", proposing that the mechanism of mental automatism could be blamed for hallucinatory experiences. He divided mental automatisms into three types: associative, motor and sensitive. He considered the mental automatism to be the primary process of psychosis while the delusional state was to be regarded as secondary. Clérambault is also credited with describing and cataloguing individual automatisms — there are considered to be around eighty distinct automatisms.

For his actions during World War I, de Clérambault was awarded with a cross of the Légion d'Honneur as well as the Croix de Guerre.

He committed suicide by firearm on 17 November 1934 in Malakoff, a commune southwest of Paris. Famously, the French psychoanalyst Jacques Lacan attributed his 'entry into psychoanalysis' as largely due to the influence of de Clérambault, whom he regarded as his 'only master in psychiatry'. Eugène Minkowski and Henri Ey were also deeply influenced by Clérambault's work in psychiatry.

In 1942, one of his former pupils, Jean Fretet, published two volumes of Clérambault's works with the title "Oeuvre Psychiatrique".

Clérambault's life and art are depicted in the film "Cry of Silk" (1996).

== Associated syndromes ==
- de Clérambault's syndrome; (also called erotomania) a condition in which a person becomes deluded that a certain person of higher social status is in love with them. It was described by Clérambault in a treatise titled "Les psychoses passionelles" (1921).
- Kandinsky-Clérambault syndrome; a confusing clinical entity in which the patient believes his mind is being controlled by someone else or external forces. Named along with Russian physician Victor Khrisanfovich Kandinsky (1849–1889).

== Publications (selection) ==
- Contribution à l'étude de l'othématome (pathogénie, anatomie pathologique et traitement). Thèse Paris, 1899.
- Contribution à l'étude de la folie communiquée et simultanée, 1903.
- Syndrome mécanique et conception mécanisiste des psychoses hallucinatoires. Annales médico-psychologiques, Paris, 1927, 85: 398–413.
- L'Automatisme mental par De Clérambault; Département psychiatrique Théraplix, 1942 (with Jean Fretet).
- Oeuvre psychiatrique. Paris, PUF, 1942 (2 vols.). Facs.ed.: Oeuvres psychiatriques. Paris, Frénésie, 1987, ISBN 2-906225-07-X
- Passion érotique des étoffes chez la femme, Montreuil-sous-bois, Les empêcheurs de penser en rond, 1991.
- "Mental automatisms. A conceptual journey into psychosis". Translation and commentaries [by Paul Hriso] on the works of Gaëtan Gatian de Clérambault. [Bayonne, N.J.], Hermes Whispers Press, 2002. ISBN 0-9718923-4-2.
