= Dissociative disorder =

Set of mental health conditions

Dissociative disorders
- Specialty: Psychiatry, clinical psychology

Dissociative disorders (DDs) are a range of mental disorders characterized by significant disruptions or fragmentation "in the normal integration of consciousness, memory, identity, emotion, perception, body representation, motor control, and behavior." Dissociative disorders involve involuntary dissociation as an unconscious defense mechanism, wherein the individual with a dissociative disorder experiences separation in these areas as a means to protect against traumatic stress. Some dissociative disorders are caused by major psychological trauma, though the onset of depersonalization-derealization disorder may be preceded by less severe stress, by the influence of psychoactive substances, or occur without any discernible trigger.

== Classification ==
Of frameworks for classification of mental disorders, the two most prominent are the Diagnostic and Statistical Manual of Mental Disorders and the International Classification of Diseases; the latest versions of these are the DSM-5-TR and ICD-11, respectively.

The DSM-IV category of dissociative disorder not otherwise specified has been split into two diagnoses: other specified dissociative disorder and unspecified dissociative disorder. These categories are used for forms of pathological dissociation that do not fully meet the criteria of the other specified dissociative disorders; or if the correct category has not been determined; or the disorder is transient. Other specified dissociative disorder (OSDD) has multiple types, which OSDD-1 falling on the spectrum of dissociative identity disorder; it is known as partial DID in the International Classification of Diseases.

The dissociative disorders listed in the American Psychiatric Association's Diagnostic and Statistical Manual of Mental Disorders, Fifth Edition (DSM-5) are as follows:

=== Dissociative identity disorder ===
Dissociative identity disorder (DID), previously known as multiple personality disorder (MPD), is a dissociative disorder characterized by the presence of at least two personality states or "alters". The diagnosis is controversial and remains disputed. Proponents of DID support the trauma model, viewing the disorder as an organic response to severe childhood trauma. Critics of the trauma model support the sociogenic model of DID as a societal construct and learned behavior used to express distress; developed through iatrogenesis in therapy, cultural beliefs, and exposure to the behavior in media or online.

According to the DSM, the disorder is accompanied by memory gaps more severe than could be explained by ordinary forgetfulness, including gaps in consciousness, basic bodily functions, and perception. Research has challenged this premise; McNally found that although patients reported amnesia between alters, objective tests found their memory function was intact. After a sharp decline in publications in the early 2000s from the peak in the 1990s, Pope et al. (2006) described the disorder as an academic fad. Boysen et al. (2012) described research as steady, but lacking in convincing evidence.

=== Dissociative amnesia ===
Dissociative amnesia or psychogenic amnesia is a dissociative disorder characterized by retrospectively reported memory gaps. These gaps involve an inability to recall personal information, usually of a traumatic or stressful nature. The concept is scientifically controversial and remains disputed.

Dissociative amnesia was previously known as psychogenic amnesia, a memory disorder, which was characterized by sudden retrograde episodic memory loss, said to occur for a period of time ranging from hours to years to decades.

The atypical clinical syndrome of the memory disorder (as opposed to organic amnesia) is that a person with dissociative amnesia is profoundly unable to remember personal information about themselves; there is a lack of conscious self-knowledge which affects even simple self-knowledge, such as who they are. Dissociative amnesia is distinguished from organic amnesia in that it is supposed to result from a nonorganic cause: no structural brain damage should be evident but some form of psychological stress should precipitate the amnesia. Dissociative amnesia as a memory disorder is controversial.

=== Depersonalization-derealization disorder ===
Depersonalization-derealization disorder (DPDR) is a dissociative disorder in which the person experiences or has persistent or recurrent feelings of depersonalization or derealization. Depersonalization is a feeling of being disconnected or detached from oneself. Individuals may report feeling as if they are an outside observer of their own thoughts or body, and often report feeling a loss of control over their thoughts or actions. Derealization is described as detachment from one's surroundings. Individuals experiencing derealization may report perceiving the world around them as foggy, dreamlike, surreal, detached or visually distorted.

=== Others ===
Dissociative fugue was previously a separate category but is now treated as a specifier for dissociative amnesia, though many patients with dissociative fugue are ultimately diagnosed with dissociative identity disorder.The ICD-11 lists dissociative disorders as:

- Dissociative neurological symptom disorder
- Dissociative amnesia
- Dissociative amnesia with dissociative fugue
- Trance disorder
- Possession trance disorder
- Dissociative identity disorder [complete]
- Partial dissociative identity disorder
- Depersonalization-derealization disorder

== Causes ==
Dissociative disorders most often develop as a way to cope with psychological trauma. People with dissociative disorders were commonly subjected to chronic physical, sexual, or emotional abuse as children (or, less frequently, an otherwise frightening or highly unpredictable home environment). Some categories of DD, however, can form due to trauma that occurs later in life and is unrelated to abuse, such as war or the death of a loved one.

=== Dissociative identity disorder ===
The cause of dissociative identity disorder is contentious; it is most often considered to be caused either by ongoing childhood trauma that occurs before the ages of six to nine, or as an unintentional product of therapy, fantasy, or other sociogenic factors.

=== Dissociative amnesia ===
This disorder is caused by psychological trauma. While a history of child abuse is common in patients, it is not a necessary factor in determining if a person will develop dissociative amnesia.

=== Depersonalization-derealization disorder ===
While not as strongly linked as other dissociative disorders, there is a correlation between depersonalization-derealization disorder and childhood trauma, especially emotional abuse or neglect. It can also be caused by other forms of stress such as sudden death of a loved one.

== Mechanism ==
=== Differences in brain activity ===
Dissociative disorders are characterized by distinct brain differences in the activation of various brain regions including the inferior parietal lobe, prefrontal cortex, and limbic system.Those with dissociative disorders have higher activity levels in the prefrontal lobe and a more inhibited limbic system on average than healthy controls. Heightened corticolimbic inhibition is associated with distinctly dissociative symptoms such as depersonalization and derealization. The function of these symptoms is thought to be a coping mechanism employed in extremely threatening or traumatic events. By inhibiting structures in the limbic system, such as the amygdala, the brain is able to reduce extreme levels of arousal. In the dissociative subtype of PTSD, there is both excessive control of emotions through suppressed limbic structures and insufficient control of emotions in the hyperactivity of the medial prefrontal cortex. Increased activity in the medial prefrontal cortex is associated with non-dissociative symptoms such as re-experiencing and hyperarousal.

=== Differences in volume of brain structures ===
There are notable differences in the volume of certain areas of the brain such as reduced cortical and subcortical volumes in the hippocampus and amygdala. Reduced volume of the amygdala may account for the lessened emotional reactivity observed during dissociation. The hippocampus is associated with learning and the formation of memory, and its reduced volume is associated with impairments in memory for those with DID and PTSD. Brain-imaging studies demonstrating the link between reduced hippocampal volume and DID as well as PTSD have added to empirical support for the existence of the disorder, as additional brain-imaging studies have demonstrated a negative correlation between hippocampal volume and early childhood trauma (which is hypothesized to be a potential etiological factor for dissociative symptoms).

The Amygdala

The Hippocampus

The Prefrontal Cortex

== Diagnosis ==
Diagnosis can be made with the help of structured clinical interviews such as the Dissociative Disorders Interview Schedule (DDIS) and the Structured Clinical Interview for DSM-IV Dissociative Disorders (SCID-D), and behavioral observation of dissociative signs during the interview. Additional information can be helpful in diagnosis, including the Dissociative Experiences Scale or other questionnaires, performance-based measures, records from doctors or academic records, and information from partners, parents, or friends. A dissociative disorder cannot be ruled out in a single session and it is common for patients diagnosed with a dissociative disorder to not have a previous dissociative disorder diagnosis due to a lack of clinician training. Some diagnostic tests have also been adapted or developed for use with children and adolescents such as the Adolescent Dissociative Experiences Scale, Children's Version of the Response Evaluation Measure (REM-Y-71), Child Interview for Subjective Dissociative Experiences, Child Dissociative Checklist (CDC), Child Behavior Checklist (CBCL) Dissociation Subscale, and the Trauma Symptom Checklist for Children Dissociation Subscale.

There are problems with classification, diagnosis and therapeutic strategies of dissociative and conversion disorders which can be understood by the historic context of hysteria. Even current systems used to diagnose DD such as the DSM-IV and ICD-10 differ in the way the classification is determined. In most cases mental health professionals are still hesitant to diagnose patients with dissociative disorder, because before they are considered to be diagnosed with dissociative disorder these patients have more than likely been diagnosed with major depressive disorder, anxiety disorder, and most often post-traumatic stress disorder. It has been found from interviews with those who may be afflicted with dissociative disorders may be more effective at getting an accurate diagnosis than self-scoring assessments and scales.

An important concern in the diagnosis of dissociative disorders in forensic interviews is the possibility that the patient may be feigning symptoms in order to escape negative consequences. Young criminal offenders report much higher levels of dissociative disorders, such as amnesia. In one study it was found that 1% of young offenders reported complete amnesia for a violent crime, while 19% claimed partial amnesia. There have also been cases in which people with dissociative identity disorder provide conflicting testimonies in court, depending on the personality that is present. The world-wide prevalence of dissociative disorders is not well understood due to different cultural beliefs surrounding human emotions and the human brain.

== Treatment ==
There are no medications to cure or completely treat dissociative disorders, however, drugs to treat anxiety and depression that may accompany the disorders can be given.

=== Dissociative identity disorder ===
This disorder is treated by means of long-term psychotherapy to improve the patient's quality of life. Psychotherapy often involves hypnosis (to help a patient remember and work through the trauma), creative art therapy (using creative process to help a person who cannot express their thoughts), cognitive therapy (talk therapy to identify unhealthy and negative beliefs or behaviors), and medications (antidepressants, anti-anxiety medications, or sedatives). These medications can help control the symptoms associated with DID and other DD, but there are no medications yet that specifically treat dissociative disorders.

=== Dissociative amnesia ===
Psychotherapy counseling or psychosocial therapy for this disorder involves talking about the disorder and related issues with a mental health provider. The medication pentothal can sometimes help to restore the memories. The length of an event of dissociative amnesia may be a few minutes or several years. If an episode is associated with a traumatic event, the amnesia may clear up when the person is removed from the traumatic situation.

=== Depersonalization-derealization disorder ===
For this disorder, the same treatment as for dissociative amnesia is utilized. An episode of depersonalization-derealization disorder can be as brief as a few seconds or continue for several years.

== Epidemiology ==
=== Prevalence ===
The lifetime prevalence of dissociative disorders varies from 10% in the general population to 46% in psychiatric inpatients.Dissociative disorders have been found to be quite prevalent in outpatient populations, as well as within low-income communities. One study found that in a population of poor inner-city outpatients, there was a 29% prevalence of dissociative disorders.

The prevalence of dissociative disorders is not completely understood due to the many difficulties in diagnosing dissociative disorders. Many of these difficulties stem from a misunderstanding of dissociative disorders, from an unfamiliarity diagnosis or symptoms to disbelief in some dissociative disorders entirely. Due to this it has been found that only 28% to 48% of people diagnosed with a dissociative disorder receive treatment for their mental health. Patients who are misdiagnosed are often those more likely to be hospitalised repeatedly, and lack of treatment can result in intensive outpatient treatment and higher rates of disability.

== Children and adolescents ==
Dissociative disorders (DD) are widely believed to have roots in adverse childhood experiences including abuse and loss, but the symptoms often go unrecognized or are misdiagnosed in children and adolescents. However, a recent western Chinese study showed an increase in awareness of dissociative disorders present in children. These studies show that DD's have an intricate relationship with the patient's mental, physical and socio-cultural environments. This study suggested that dissociative disorders are more common in Western, or developing countries, however, some cases have been seen in both clinical and non-clinical Chinese populations. There are several reasons why recognizing symptoms of dissociation in children is challenging: it may be difficult for children to describe their internal experiences; caregivers may miss signals or attempt to conceal their own abusive or neglectful behaviors; symptoms can be subtle or fleeting; disturbances of memory, mood, or concentration associated with dissociation may be misinterpreted as symptoms of other disorders.

Another resource, Beacon House, informs us of dissociative disorder in children, suggesting that it is a survival mechanism that often goes unnoticed in children that have been traumatised. Dr. Shoshanah Lyons suggests that traumatised children often continue to dissociate even though they might not be in any danger, and that they are often unaware that they are dissociating. In addition to developing diagnostic tests for children and adolescents (see above), a number of approaches have been developed to improve recognition and understanding of dissociation in children. Recent research has focused on clarifying the neurological basis of symptoms associated with dissociation by studying neurochemical, functional and structural brain abnormalities that can result from childhood trauma. Others in the field have argued that recognizing disorganized attachment (DA) in children can help alert clinicians to the possibility of dissociative disorders. In their 2008 article, Rebecca Seligman and Laurence Kirmayer suggest the existence of evidence of linkages between trauma experienced in childhood and the capacity for dissociation or depersonalisation. They also suggest that individuals who are able to utilise dissociative techniques are able to keep this as an extended strategy to cope with stressful situations.

Clinicians and researchers stress the importance of using a developmental model to understand both symptoms and the future course of DDs. In other words, symptoms of dissociation may manifest differently at different stages of child and adolescent development and individuals may be more or less susceptible to developing dissociative symptoms at different ages. Further research into the manifestation of dissociative symptoms and vulnerability throughout development is needed. Related to this developmental approach, more research is required to establish whether a young patient's recovery will remain stable over time.

== Current debates and the DSM-5 ==
A number of aspects of dissociative disorders are currently in active debate. First, there is ongoing debate surrounding the etiology of dissociative identity disorder (DID). The crux of this debate is if DID is the result of childhood trauma or disorganized attachment. A proposed view is that dissociation has a physiological basis, in that it involves automatically triggered mechanisms such as increased blood pressure and alertness, that would, as Lynn contends, imply its existence as a cross-species disorder. A second area of discussion surrounds the question of whether there is a qualitative or quantitative difference between dissociation as a defense versus pathological dissociation. Experiences and symptoms of dissociation can range from the more mundane to those associated with post traumatic stress disorder (PTSD) or acute stress disorder (ASD) to dissociative disorders. Mirroring this complexity, the DSM-5 workgroup considered grouping dissociative disorders with other trauma/stress disorders, but instead decided to put them in the following chapter to emphasize the close relationship. The DSM-5 also introduced a dissociative subtype of PTSD.

A 2012 review article supports the hypothesis that current or recent trauma may affect an individual's assessment of the more distant past, changing the experience of the past and resulting in dissociative states. However, experimental research in cognitive science continues to challenge claims concerning the validity of the dissociation construct, which is still based on Janetian notions of structural dissociation. Even the claimed etiological link between trauma/abuse and dissociation has been questioned. Links observed between trauma/abuse and DD are largely only present from a Western cultural context. For non-Western cultures dissociation "may constitute a "normal" psychological capacity". An alternative model proposes a perspective on dissociation based on a recently established link between a labile sleep–wake cycle and memory errors, cognitive failures, problems in attentional control, and difficulties in distinguishing fantasy from reality."

Debates around DD also stem from Western versus non-Western lenses of viewing the disorder, and associated views of causes of DD. DID was initially believed to be specific to the West, until cross-cultural studies indicated its occurrence worldwide. Conversely, anthropologists have largely done little work on DD in the West relating to its perceptions of possession syndromes that would be present in non-Western societies. While dissociation has been viewed and catalogued by anthropologists differently in the West and non-Western societies, there are aspects of each that show DD has universal characteristics. For example, while shamanic and rituals of non-Western societies may hold dissociative aspects, this is not exclusive as many Christian sects, such as "possession by the Holy Ghost" share similar qualities to those of non-Western trances.

== See also ==
- Complex post-traumatic stress disorder
- Dissociative (substance)
- Absence seizures
- Psychogenic non-epileptic (dissociative) seizure
- Borderline personality disorder
