= Social identity complexity =

The concept of Social Identity Complexity (Roccas and Brewer, 2002) is a theoretical construct that refers to an individual's subjective representation of the interrelationships among their multiple group identities.

Social identity complexity reflects the degree of overlap perceived to exist between groups of which a person is simultaneously a member.

Roccas and Brewer report that membership in many different groups (multiple social identities) can lead to greater social identity complexity, which can foster the development of superordinate social identities and global identity, making international identity more likely in individualist cultures (see Tajfel & Turner [1986] for a review of social identity theory).

Social identity complexity may be a crucial factor to consider in applying social psychological models of bias reduction.

Poetics – like coolitude or creolization – have used the rhizome to refer to multiple identities.

Social identity complexity has also been applied heuristically in other fields, like in Theology (e.g. by J. Kok and others), specifically in New Testament studies to study the complexity of identity and boundaries in the New Testament and Early Christianity. This kind of approach can then be used to reflect critically on ways that Christianity forms identity and how to deal with conflict and mediation.
