= Other and unspecified dissociative disorders =

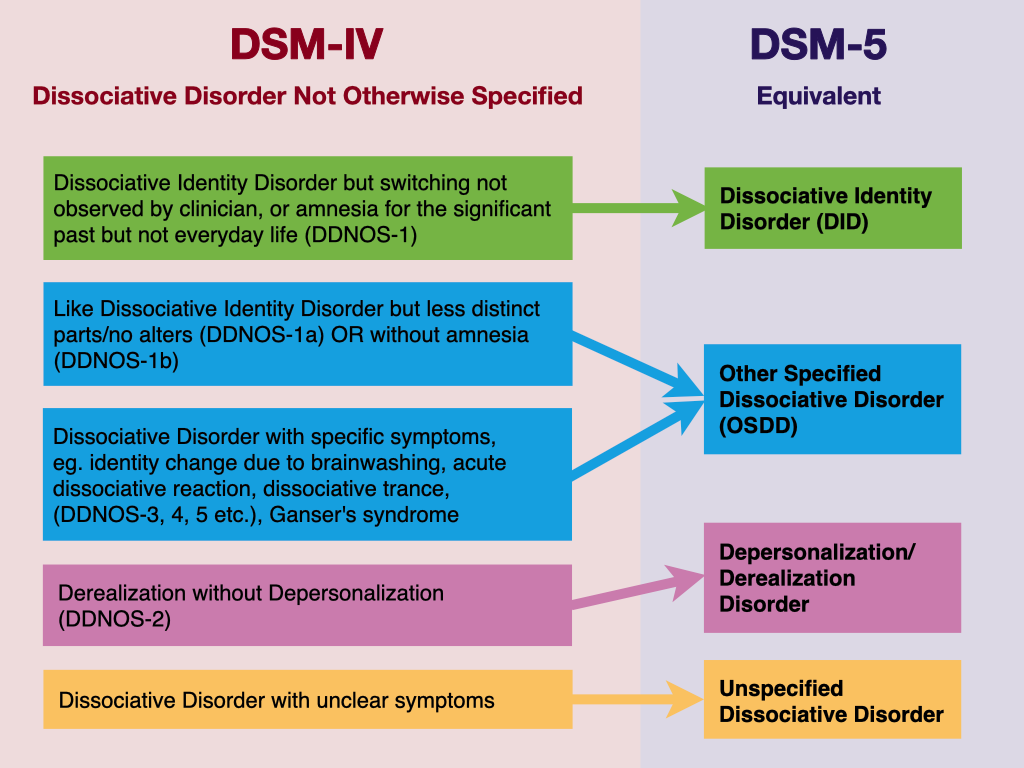
Visualization of the transition from DD-NOS in the DSM-IV-TR to diagnoses in the DSM-5.

Other specified dissociative disorder (OSDD) and Unspecified dissociative disorder (UDD) are two diagnostic categories for dissociative disorders (DDs) defined in the fifth edition (DSM-5) of the Diagnostic and Statistical Manual of Mental Disorders for individuals experiencing pathological dissociation that does not meet the full criteria for any specific dissociative disorder, such as dissociative identity disorder or depersonalization-derealization disorder. These two categories replaced the earlier Dissociative Disorder Not Otherwise Specified (DDNOS) used in the DSM-IV and DSM-IV-TR.

OSDD is used when the clinician can identify the reason why the presentation doesn’t fit a specific diagnosis, such as mixed dissociative symptoms or identity disturbance following coercive persuasion. A diagnosis of unspecified dissociative disorder is given when this reason is not specified.

Like other dissociative disorders, these conditions are often trauma-related and may co-occur with other mental health diagnoses. Dissociative conditions appear to respond well to psychotherapy. There are currently no drugs available that treat dissociative symptoms directly.

== Other specified dissociative disorder ==
Other specified dissociative disorder
- Specialty: Psychiatry
- Symptoms: Various dissociative symptoms which do not align well with specific dissociative disorders
- Causes: Trauma

Other specified dissociative disorder (OSDD) is a mental health diagnosis for pathological dissociation that matches the DSM-5 criteria for a dissociative disorder, but does not fit the full criteria for any of the dissociative disorders, such as dissociative identity disorder, dissociative amnesia, and depersonalization/derealization disorder. Additionally, a diagnosis requires that reasons why the presentation does not fit specific diagnoses are specified. The ICD-10 diagnosis which includes the DSM-5's OSDD (F44.89) is "Other dissociative [conversion] disorders" (F44.8). The ICD-11 includes the diagnosis "Other specified dissociative disorders" (6B6Y).

There are currently four examples of presentations of OSDD given in the DSM:

1. “Chronic and recurrent syndromes of mixed dissociative symptoms: This category includes identity disturbance associated with less-than-marked discontinuities in sense of self and agency, or alterations of identity or episodes of possession in an individual who reports no dissociative amnesia”

- OSDD-1 was previously known as DDNOS-1. While it was its own disorder, it was also split into two further subcategories: 1a and 1b. DDNOS-1a was defined by disturbances associated with alterations of identity that were less marked than in dissociative identity disorder (DID). These parts could not be described as "distinct personality states"^{[1]} or "alters", for they lacked distinct differentiation. People often experienced these parts as different modes, versions, or ages of themselves, and amnesia was still present. Alternatively, DDNOS-1b was often considered functionally closer to DID, although individuals presented with little to no dissociative amnesia, less fragmented identities, and simpler internal organisation/splitting patterns. While OSDD now encompasses both of these diagnostic subcategories in a single, catch-all diagnosis, some individuals (especially in the DID/OSDD community) choose to continue using this terminology alongside the updated format, applying specifiers such as 1a or 1b to the OSDD label, even though they are now unofficial.

2. "Identity disturbance due to prolonged and intense coercive persuasion: Individuals who have been subjected to intense coercive persuasion (e.g., brainwashing, thought reform, indoctrination while captive, torture, long-term political imprisonment, recruitment by sects/cults or by terror organizations) may present with prolonged changes in, or conscious questioning of, their identity."

3. "Acute dissociative reactions to stressful events: This category is for acute, transient conditions that typically last less than 1 month, and sometimes only a few hours or days. These conditions are characterized by constriction of consciousness; depersonalization; derealization; perceptual disturbances (e.g., time slowing, macropsia); microamnesias; transient stupor; and/or alterations in sensory-motor functioning (e.g., analgesia, paralysis)."

4. "Dissociative trance: This condition is characterized by an acute narrowing or complete loss of awareness of immediate surroundings that manifests as profound unresponsiveness or insensitivity to environmental stimuli. The unresponsiveness may be accompanied by minor stereotyped behaviors (e.g., finger movements) of which the individual is unaware and/or that they cannot control, as well as transient paralysis or loss of consciousness. The dissociative trance is not a normal part of a broadly accepted collective cultural or religious practice."

- Note: This may sound, and even look, similar to catatonia on the surface. However, this a dissociative disorder marked by temporary alterations in consciousness, identity and/or environment. Meanwhile, catatonia is neuropsychiatric condition often associated with psychosis. It frequently involves symptoms such as posturing, mannerism, echopraxia and/or stupor.

When diagnosing OSDD, a clinician specifies more detail on the diagnosis in the client's file. The DSM-5 gives the example of "recording 'other specified dissociative disorder' followed by the specific reason (e.g., 'dissociative trance')." A common misconception with the examples listed in the DSM is that they are four "types" of OSDD, but the DSM never actually names the examples as "types" of OSDD; rather, it lists them as examples of what the clinician could specify in the client's file.

OSDD is the most common dissociative disorder and is diagnosed in 40% of dissociative disorder cases. It is often co-morbid with other mental illnesses such as complex posttraumatic stress disorder, major depressive disorder, generalized anxiety disorder, personality disorders, substance use disorders, and eating disorders.

== Unspecified dissociative disorder ==
A diagnosis of Unspecified dissociative disorder is given when the clinician does not give a reason for criteria for a specific dissociative disorder not being met. The DSM-5 gives the example of "insufficient information to make a more specific diagnosis (e.g., in emergency room settings)" as a reason for why this might be the case. The ICD-10 contains the similarly named diagnosis Dissociative [conversion] disorder, unspecified (F44.9), and the ICD-11 contains Dissociative disorders, unspecified (6B6Z).

== Dissociative disorder not otherwise specified ==
Dissociative disorder not otherwise specified
- Other names: Other dissociative and conversion disorders, partial dissociative identity disorder
- Specialty: Psychiatry
- Differential diagnosis: Conversion disorder (CD)/Functional neurologic symptom disorder (FNsD), Dissociative identity disorder, Depersonalization-derealization disorder, Borderline personality disorder, Post-traumatic stress disorder, Unspecified dissociative disorder

Dissociative disorder not otherwise specified (DDNOS) was a mental health diagnosis for pathological dissociation that matched the DSM-IV criteria for a dissociative disorder, but did not fit the full criteria for any of the specific dissociative disorders.

=== Diagnosis ===
Several examples of how DDNOS can manifest are provided in the DSM-IV. These examples, due to being numbered have been used as distinct subtypes of DDNOS in the following manner:

- DDNOS 1 – DID but switching not observed by clinician, or amnesia for the significant past but not everyday life.
- DDNOS 1a – Like DID but with less distinct parts/no alters. Alters may be emotional fragments or the same individual at different ages. Can experience emotional amnesia rather than physical amnesia.
- DDNOS 1b – Like DID but no amnesia between alters.
- DDNOS 2 – Derealization without depersonalization.
- DDNOS 3, 4, 5, etc. – DID but with specific symptoms. Eg.: Identity change due to brainwashing, acute dissociative reaction, dissociative trance, Ganser syndrome.
- Dissociative disorder with unclear symptoms.

== See also ==
- Conversion disorder
- Dissociation
- Identity
- Jamais vu
- Post-traumatic stress disorder (PTSD)
- Complex post-traumatic stress disorder (C-PTSD)
