= Norman Brad Schmidt =

American psychologist

Norman Bradley Schmidt is an American psychologist. Earned PhD from the University of Texas in 1991. Distinguished research professor at Florida State University.

Focuses on anxiety and related psychopathology. Author of more than 500 peer-reviewed publications. Received over 15 million dollars in research funding.
