= Wilhelm Mayer-Gross =

German-British professor and psychiatrist (1889–1961)

Wilhelm Mayer-Gross (January 15, 1889 – February 15, 1961) was a German-British psychiatrist and professor. He was one of the founders of the British school of psychiatry.

== Early life and education ==
He was born in Bingen am Rhein, Germany, however in 1933 he moved to England. He was one of the disciples of Franz Nissl.
