= Victor Kandinsky =

Russian psychiatrist (1849–1889)

- Виктор Хрисанфович Кандинский
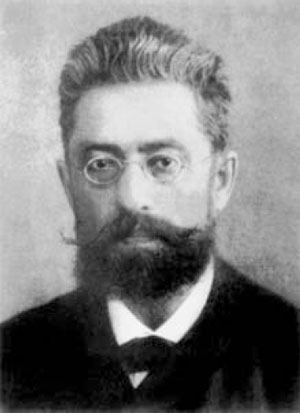
- Portrait of Victor Kandinsky, 1880
- Born: 6 April 1849; Byankino, Nerchinsky District, Transbaikal Oblast, Russian Empire
- Died: 3 July 1889 (aged 40); Saint Petersburg, Russian Empire
- Cause of death: suicide by opium
- Citizenship: Russian Empire
- Education: Moscow Imperial University (1872)
- Known for: research on the psychopathology of pseudohallucinations
- Spouse: Elizaveta Karlovna Freimut–Kandinskaya
- Scientific career
- Fields: Psychiatry
- Workplaces: Psychiatric Hospital of St. Nicholas the Wonderworker (1881–1889)
- Academic advisors: Aleksei Kozhevnikov

Victor Khrisanfovich Kandinsky (Russian: Виктор Хрисанфович Кандинский, IPA: [ˈvʲiktər xrʲɪˈsanfəvʲɪtɕ kɐnʲˈdʲinskʲɪj]; 6 April 1849 – 3 July 1889) was a psychiatrist from the Russian Empire and a second cousin to the renowned artist Wassily Kandinsky. Born in Siberia into a wealthy family of businessmen, Victor Kandinsky is regarded as a significant figure in Russian psychiatry, particularly for his contributions to the understanding of hallucinations. His posthumously published monograph "On Pseudohallucinations" described a condition later termed Kandinsky–Clérambault syndrome.

== Biography ==
Kandinsky graduated from Moscow Imperial University Medical School in 1872 and began his career as a general practitioner in a hospital in Moscow.

In 1877, while serving as a military physician during the Russo-Turkish War, he began experiencing mood swings and hallucinations. He was medically discharged on 13 May 1877 and admitted to a naval hospital for treatment. Following the end of the war, Kandinsky was awarded a bronze medal for his service in the conflict.

In 1878, he married his medical nurse, Elizaveta Karlovna Freimut (Russian: Елизавета Карловна Фреймут). Kandinsky’s personal physician diagnosed him with melancholia, but he self-identified his condition as primäre Verrücktheit (German for "primary paranoid psychosis"), which is anachronistically associated with modern concepts of schizophrenia-like disorders. Contemporary psychiatrists diagnose him with paranoid schizophrenia.

In October 1878, Victor was admitted to a psychiatric hospital once again. He was transferred to A. Y. Frey Private Psychiatric Hospital in Saint Petersburg. By 1879, he returned to Moscow.

In 1881, he relocated to Saint Petersburg, where he worked at the Psychiatric Hospital of St. Nicholas the Wonderworker since August 1881.

Kandinsky joined the St. Petersburg Psychiatric Association on 23 January 1882.

In 1885, he published a German-language book titled "Kritische und klinische Betrachtungen im Gebiete der Sinnestäuschungen" (Critical and Clinical Considerations in the Area of Hallucinations), detailing his personal experiences with pseudohallucinations.

In July 1889, feeling the recurrence of psychotic symptoms, Kandinsky tragically took his own life by overdosing on opium. His last written words were: "1) I had about n grams of opium… 2) I'm reading 'The Cossacks' by Tolstoy… 3) It is becoming difficult for me to read…" (Russian: "Проглотил n граммов опиума… Читаю "Казаков" Толстого… Читать становится трудно.). He died as a patient at the institution he had previously run as medical superintendent, the St. Nicholas Asylum in Saint Petersburg.

His wife, Elizaveta Freimut-Kandinsky, later arranged for the posthumous publication of his scientific works, including "On Pseudohallucinations" and "On Irresponsibility," before taking her own life.

== Scientific contribution ==
Kandinsky authored numerous journal papers in Russian, German, and French on psychiatric, medical, and philosophical subjects. His monograph "On Pseudohallucinations" (Russian: О псевдогаллюцинациях) published posthumously in 1890, described a condition characterised by alienation from personal mental processes, along with delusions of control by external forces. This condition was later termed Kandinsky–Clérambault syndrome, after Kandinsky and French psychiatrist Gaëtan Gatian de Clérambault, who also independently studied and described similar symptoms. The syndrome, also referred to as the syndrome of mental automatism, remains a notable concept in the study of psychotic disorders, particularly paranoid schizophrenia.

Kandinsky experienced various types of pseudohallucinations—visual, tactile, auditory—in all sensory modalities except taste. His initial studies on pseudohallucinations were based on detailed descriptions of his subjective personal experiences during psychotic episodes.

Kandinsky's major contributions to psychiatry include advancements in psychiatric classification, psychopathology, and forensic psychiatry. In 1882, he developed a diagnostic system with 16 categories of mental disorders, which was widely used by the Psychiatric Hospital of St. Nicholas the Wonderworker for many years. He also coined the term "Ideophrenia" in 1890 to describe a disorder of perception and thinking, which was later replaced by the term "schizophrenia" still in use today.

=== Works ===
Books in Russian

- Kandinsky, V. Kh. (1881). Общепонятные психологические этюды: I. Очерк прежних и современных воззрений на психическую жизнь человека и животных. II. Нервно-психический контагий и душевные эпидемии [Comprehensible Psychological "Etudes"] (in Russian). Moscow: Издание книгопродавца А. Ланг (A. Lang Publishing). p. 235.
- Kandinsky, V. Kh. (1890). К вопросу о невменяемости [On Irresponsibility] (in Russian). Moscow: Издание Е. К. Кандинской (Elizaveta Karlovna Kandinsky's Publishing). p. 239.
- Kandinsky, V. Kh. (1890). О псевдогаллюцинациях. Критико-клинический этюд ["On Pseudohallucinations" or "About Pseudohallucinations"] (in Russian). Saint Petersburg, Russia: Издание Е. К. Кандинской (Elizaveta Karlovna Kandinsky's Publishing). p. 164.

Reprinted books

- Kandinsky, V. Kh. (1952). О псевдогаллюцинациях. ["On Pseudohallucinations" or "About Pseudohallucinations"] (in Russian). Медгиз. p. 175.
- Kandinsky, V. Kh. (2001). О псевдогаллюцинациях. ["On Pseudohallucinations" or "About Pseudohallucinations"]. Раритеты медицинской литературы (in Russian). Saint Petersburg, Russia: Фонд "Содружество". p. 222. ISBN 5-94531-001-8.
- Kandinsky, V. Kh. (2001). О псевдогаллюцинациях. ["On Pseudohallucinations" or "About Pseudohallucinations"]. Библиотека медицинской классики. Психиатрия. (in Russian). Nizhny Novgorod: Nizhny Novgorod State Medical Academy. p. 155. ISBN 5-86093-055-0.

Philosophy

- Kandinsky, V. Kh. (1881). Современный монизм (популярно-философский этюд). [Modern Monism]. Мир (in Russian). 1: 239–268.
- Kandinsky, V. Kh. (1882). Современный монизм (популярно-философский этюд). [Modern Monism] (in Russian). Kharkiv: Издание книжного магазина В. А. Сыхра. p. 32.

Psychiatry

- Kandinsky, V. Kh. (1880). К учению о галлюцинациях. [To the theory of hallucinations.]. Медицинское обозрѣніе (Медицинское обозрение) (in Russian). 13: 815–824.
- Kandinsky, V. Kh. (1883). Случай сомнительного душевного состояния перед судом присяжных (Дело девицы Юлии Губаревой). [(The case of the young woman Julia Gubareva)]. Архив психиатрии, нейрологии и судебной психопатологии (in Russian). 2 (2): 1–70.
- Kandinsky, V. Kh. (1885). Клинические и критические изыскания в области чувств.. Медицинское обозрѣніе (Медицинское обозрение) (in Russian). 23 (3): 231–235.
- Kandinsky, V. Kh. (1876). Нервно-психический контагий и душевные эпидемии.. Природа (in Russian). 2: 138–191.

Medical articles (in medical journals)

- Kandinsky, V. Kh. (1874). Медицинские съезды на западе в 1873 г. [International Conventions in the West in 1873.]. Медицинское обозрѣніе (Медицинское обозрение) (in Russian). 1: 116–123.
- Kandinsky, V. Kh. (1874). Русская земская медицина в 1873 году. [Russian State Medicine in 1873.]. Медицинское обозрѣніе (Медицинское обозрение) (in Russian). 1: 102–112.
- Kandinsky, V. Kh. (1874). Съезд немецких естествоиспытателей и врачей в Бреславле.. Медицинское обозрѣніе (Медицинское обозрение) (in Russian). 2: 247–254.
- Kandinsky, V. Kh. (1874). Съезд немецких естествоиспытателей и врачей в Бреславле.. Медицинское обозрѣніе (Медицинское обозрение) (in Russian). 2: 309–312.
- Kandinsky, V. Kh. (1874). "IV съезд русских естествоиспытателей и врачей". Медицинское обозрѣніе (Медицинское обозрение) (in Russian). I: 112–115.
- Kandinsky, V. Kh. (1875). Заметки относительно санитарного дела в России.. Медицинское обозрѣніе (Медицинское обозрение) (in Russian). 3: 345–352.
- Kandinsky, V. Kh. (1875). О сжигании умерших. [On the Burning of Bodies.]. Медицинское обозрѣніе (Медицинское обозрение) (in Russian). 3: 422–433.
- Kandinsky, V. Kh. (1875). Обзор работ по болезням органов дыхания в 1874 году.. Медицинское обозрѣніе (Медицинское обозрение) (in Russian). 3: 97–127.
- Kandinsky, V. Kh. (1875). Обзор работ по болезням сердца в 1874 г.. Медицинское обозрѣніе (Медицинское обозрение) (in Russian). 3: 199–203.
- Kandinsky, V. Kh. (1875). Третий съезд земских врачей Самарской губернии в 1874 г.. Медицинское обозрѣніе (Медицинское обозрение) (in Russian). 3: 80–84.

In German and Polish

- Kandinsky W. H. (1885). "Kritische und klinische Betrachtungen im Gebiete der Sinnestäuschungen. Erste und zweite studie" (in German). Berlin: Friedländer und Sohn: 170.
- Kandinski W. C. (1956). "O pseudohalucynacjach" ["On Pseudohallucinations" or "About Pseudohallucinations".] (in Polish). Translated by Lidia Uszkiewicz. Warszawa: Państwowy Zakład Wydawnictw Lekarskich (PZWL): 163.
- Kandinsky W. H. (1881). "Zur Lehre von den Halluzinationen" [To the theory of hallucinations.]. Archiv für Psychiatrie und Nervenkrankheiten (in German). 11 (2): 453–464. doi:10.1007/BF02054811. S2CID 5766085.
- Kandinsky W. H. (1884). "Kritische und klinische Betrachtungen im Gebiete der Sinnestäuschungen". Centralblatt für Nervenheilkunde, Psychiatrie und gerichtliche Psychopathologie (in German) (21): 481–485.

Translated into Russian

- Механика душевной деятельности. Речь, произнесённая в собрании естествоиспытателей в Висбадене и в Венском Антропологическом обществе. (in Russian). Translated by V. Kh. Kandinsky. Moscow: Типография М. Н. Лаврова и К° [M. N. Lavrov and K° Publishing]. 1880. p. 31.
- Основания физиологической психологии. (in Russian). Vol. 1 & 2. Translated by V. Kh. Kandinsky. Moscow: Типография М. Н. Лаврова и К° [M. N. Lavrov and K° Publishing]. 1880. p. 512.
- Основания физиологической психологии. (in Russian). Vol. 2. Translated by V. Kh. Kandinsky. Moscow: Типография М. Н. Лаврова и К° [M. N. Lavrov and K° Publishing]. 1881. pp. 513–1038.
- Ландуа Л. (1881). Руководство к физиологии человека, со включением гистологии и микроскопической анатомии, обработанное с точки зрения практической медицины. (in Russian). Translated by V. Kh. Kandinsky. Moscow: Типография М. Н. Лаврова и К° [M. N. Lavrov and K° Publishing]. p. 224.
