= Steven Reiss =

American psychologist (1947–2016)

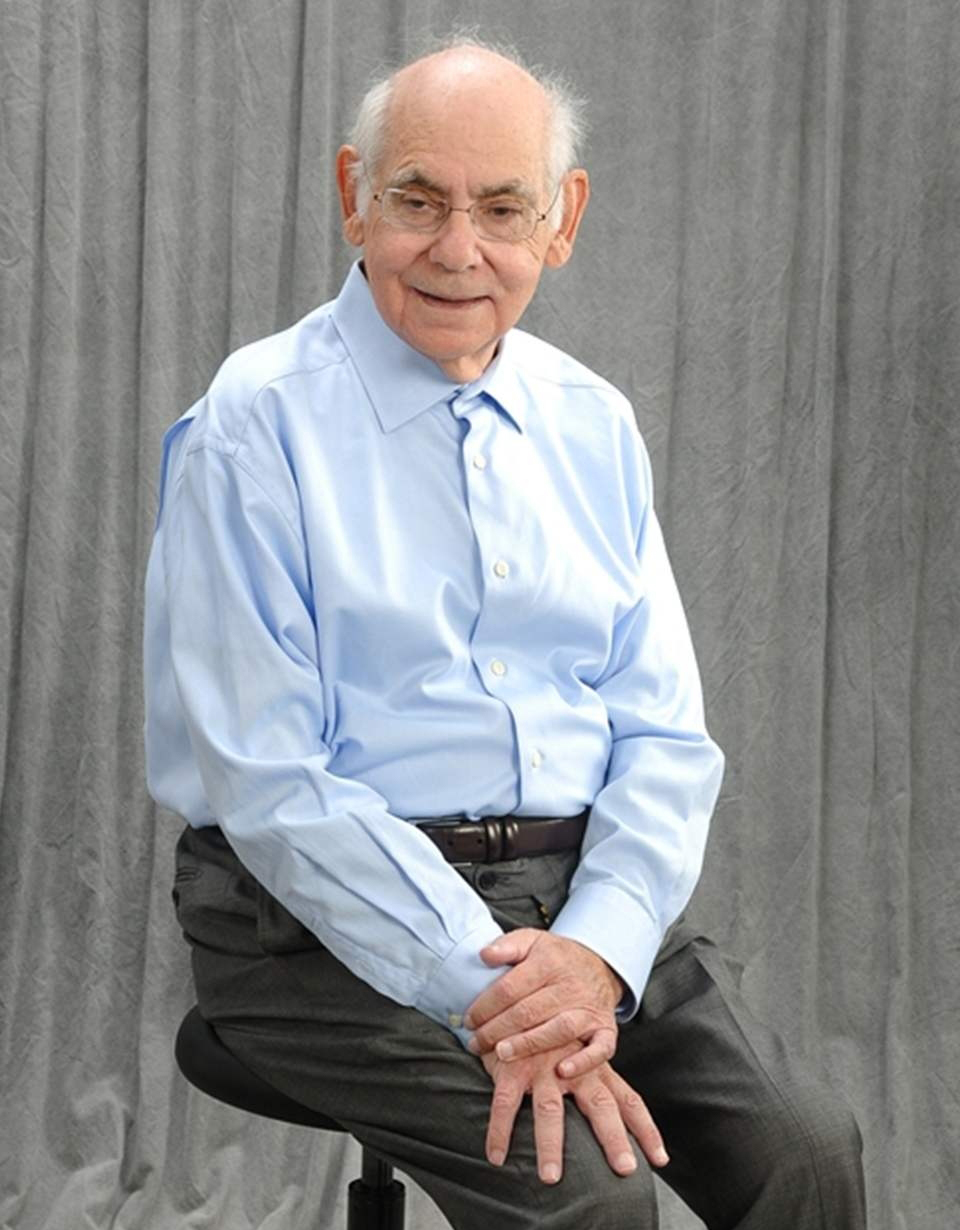
- Born: April 10, 1947
- Died: October 28, 2016 (aged 69)
- Education: Dartmouth College; Yale University; Harvard University
- Scientific career
- Fields: Psychology
- Workplaces: Ohio State University; University of Illinois Chicago

Steven Reiss (1947–2016) was an American psychologist who contributed original ideas, new assessment methods, and influential research studies to four topics in psychology: anxiety disorders, developmental disabilities, intrinsic motivation, and the psychology of religion.

== Biography ==
He was born in New York City in 1947 and was educated at Dartmouth College, Yale University, and Harvard University. At Dartmouth he was one of 16 members of his undergraduate class to be awarded Senior Fellow status. He served as a tenured professor at the University of Illinois at Chicago (1972–1991) and at Ohio State University (1991–2008), where for 16 years he directed the developmental disabilities center at Ohio State University Wexner Medical Center.

Reiss died, 28 October 2016, at age 69.

== Anxiety disorders ==
Reiss led the research team that discovered anxiety sensitivity, eventually overcoming fierce opposition to his idea that the fear of fear arises from beliefs about the consequences of anxiety and not just from Pavlovian associations with panic attacks. In the 1990s anxiety sensitivity became one of the most widely studied and important topics in clinical psychology, with more than 1,800 published studies. It changed how therapists evaluate and treat Posttraumatic Stress Disorder and Panic Disorder, disorders that affect 10 million Americans. Therapists now treat anxiety sensitivity cognitions they had erroneously dismissed as unimportant. Anxiety sensitivity sometimes predicts anxiety disorders before clinical symptoms can be observed, thereby creating new opportunities for prevention research. Reiss introduced the term “anxiety sensitivity,” defined the construct in terms of an information processing model, mentored graduate students who went on to study the construct, and wrote the Anxiety Sensitivity Index, which is widely used in the assessment of anxiety disorders.

== Developmental disabilities ==
Reiss was an authority on "dual diagnosis" or the co-occurrence of mental illness and intellectual disabilities. About one million Americans have a dual diagnosis, but in severe form the prevalence is closer to about 200,000 people, many of whom also have autism.

In 1980 Reiss founded an outpatient clinic for dual diagnosis in the Chicago metropolitan area, one of the first outpatient programs for dual diagnosis in the nation. Mental health professionals cited the success of this clinic to help justify and fund hundreds of new psychiatric services in North America and Europe.

Reiss introduced the term "diagnostic overshadowing" to refer to the tendency to overlook the mental health needs of people with developmental disabilities. In 1987, he organized the first international conference on the mental health aspects of intellectual disabilities. The director of the National Institute of Mental Health convened an ad hoc panel to fast-track funding for Reiss's conference. In 1987, Reiss also published the Reiss Screen for Maladaptive Behavior, which became the leading method in North America for screening for dual diagnosis. The tool greatly reduced the cost of identifying service needs for many thousands of people with a dual diagnosis. This was followed by a children's version, the Reiss Scales, in 1994.

In 1998 Reiss and Ohio State University professor Michael Aman convened a panel of 105 physicians and scientists from ten nations to write a consensus handbook of best practices aimed at reducing the abuse of psychiatric overmedication.

Reiss was among the scientists, therapists, and advocates who replaced custodial institutional care with community supports and appropriate education. Although his efforts were concentrated on dual diagnosis, he also served on official classification and terminology committees, advocated nationally to lessen discrimination for organ transplant operations, and helped build the Human Development Institute in Chicago. He received the 2008 Distinguished Research Award from the American Association on Intellectual and Developmental Disabilities (AAIDD), the 2006 Frank J. Menolascino Award for Career Research from the National Association on Dual Diagnosis, the 1991 Distinguished Award for Career Research from the Arc of the United States, and the 1987 Distinguished Services Award from AAIDD.

== Intrinsic motivation ==
Previous scholars answered the question, "What makes people tick", by observing primitive tribes, studying the unconscious mind, or through philosophical inquiry. Reiss and his colleagues executed the first large-scale, cross-cultural, scientific research surveys of what people say motivates them. More than 6,000 people from four continents were assessed. The results identified 16 psychological needs or "basic desires", goals common to everyone and deeply rooted in human nature. According to the study, everyone embraces the 16 basic desires, but individuals prioritize them differently. Reiss wrote the Reiss Motivation Profile psychological tool to assess what motivates a person.

In two books Reiss applied these concepts to a new method of life coaching. His methods have been used for leadership training and conflict resolution by multinational companies such as Comcast, Kraft, Chrysler, and Siemens. Reiss created an international network of seven training institutes located in Europe and Asia to train business consultants in his methods of life coaching. Reiss applied the 16 basic desires to assessing academic underachievement and motivating students. Many public schools located throughout the United States use the Reiss School Motivation Profile assessment tool.

In 2000 and 2004 Reiss first presented his scientific theory of what motivates religious experiences and practices. This theory holds that all religious experiences express one or more of the 16 basic desires.

Reiss and colleague James Wiltz published a seminal and widely publicized study on the popularity of reality television based on the 16 basic desires. This work was discussed on BBC television in the UK.

Peter Boltersdorf, a German coach, applied Reiss’s 16 basic desires to a comprehensive analysis of sports psychology. Boltersdorf’s clients have won an Olympic Gold Medal (Mathias Steiner, weightlifting, Beijing) and a world championship (handball, 2007).

Reiss was a critic of the social psychology attack on the profit motive. He exposed flaws in the underlying science and the failure to consider contradictory data. Reiss argued that the so-called undermining effect of extrinsic reward on intrinsic motivation is actually a trivial distraction effect (i.e. the reward mechanism distracts people from the task at hand), of no scientific significance.

== Psychology of religious experiences ==
In October 2015 Reiss published The 16 Strivings for God, the book-length treatment of his theory on the psychology of religious experiences. In this work Reiss proposed a peer-reviewed, original theory of mysticism, asceticism, spiritual personality, and religious beliefs and practices.

Reiss' theory of the psychology of religious experiences provides a link between personality, motivation and the often contradictory teachings and practices of the world's religions. Unlike previous theories that posit a single source and essence of religion such as fear of death, mysticism, sacredness, communal bonding, magic, or peak experiences, Reiss presented detailed support for his theory that religion is about the values motivated by the sixteen basic desires of human nature.

In The 16 Strivings for God Reiss develops the theory that people embrace religion because it provides them with opportunities to satisfy all 16 basic desires both in strong form and in weak form. For example, a person with a weak basic desire for social contact might be attracted to religious retreats, while a person with a strong basic desire for social contact might be attracted to religious festivals. A person with a weak basic desire for vengeance might be attracted to passages in scriptures that speak of peace and forgiveness, while a person with a strong basic desire for vengeance might be attracted to passages that speak of revenge.
