= Effects of meditation =

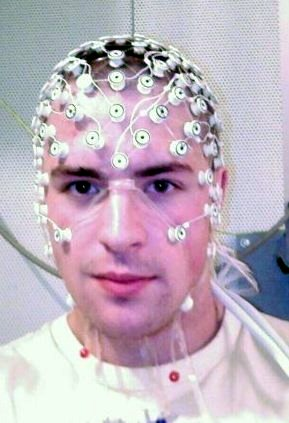
Electroencephalography has been used for meditation research.

The psychological and physiological effects of meditation have been studied. In recent years, studies of meditation have increasingly involved the use of modern instruments, such as functional magnetic resonance imaging and electroencephalography, which are able to observe brain physiology and neural activity in living subjects, either during the act of meditation itself or before and after meditation. Correlations can thus be established between meditative practices and brain structure or function.

Since the 1950s, hundreds of studies on meditation have been conducted, but many of the early studies were flawed and thus yielded unreliable results. Another major review article also cautioned about possible misinformation and misinterpretation of data related to the subject. Contemporary studies have attempted to address many of these flaws by employing randomized controlled trials, active control groups, and more rigorous methodological standards, with several meta-analyses of clinical studies also examining the potential mental and physical health effects of meditation across different populations.

An extensive review of 44 meta-analyses, encompassing 336 randomized controlled trials and over 30,000 participants, systematically evaluated the empirical status of mindfulness-based interventions. The authors concluded that these interventions demonstrate substantial transdiagnostic potential, while also identifying ways in which the evidence base could be further strengthened. Further, recent (2026) meta-analyses indicate that second-generation mindfulness-based interventions that incorporate compassion-based practices may be especially beneficial for clinical populations.

Some researchers have questioned the validity of self-reported mindfulness, suggesting that increases observed during interventions may be an artefact rather than an intervention effect, as similar increases have also been found in control groups. Others have stated that individual differences may exist in terms of who could benefit from mindfulness. However, more recent meta-analysis of randomized studies indicate that mindfulness practices can also bring about changes in objectively measured outcomes, including performance-based measures of cognitive functioning, physiological measures such as blood pressure, measures of brain function, and changes in biomarkers.

== Effects of mindfulness meditation ==
Several systematic reviews and meta-analyses show that mindfulness meditation has mental health benefits, including reductions in depression symptoms, improvements in mood, strengthening of stress-resilience, and attentional control. Mindfulness interventions also appear promising for managing depression in youth. Mindfulness meditation is useful for managing stress, anxiety, and also appears to be effective in treating substance use disorders. In 2016, Hilton and colleagues published a meta-analysis of 30 randomized controlled trials, found high-quality evidence for improvement in depressive symptoms. Other reviews have concluded that mindfulness meditation can enhance the psychological functioning of breast cancer survivors, is effective for people with eating disorders and may also be effective in treating psychosis.

Studies have also shown that rumination and worry contribute to mental illnesses such as depression and anxiety, and mindfulness-based interventions are effective in the reduction of worry. Some studies suggest that mindfulness meditation contributes to a more coherent and healthy sense of self and identity when considering aspects such as a sense of responsibility, authenticity, compassion, self-acceptance, and character.

=== Brain mechanisms ===
The analgesic effect of mindfulness meditation may involve multiple brain mechanisms, of which chronic pain is shown to have a slight decrease when performing meditation. Current research demonstrates a lack of high-quality data to support a strong case for clinical prescription of meditation, however future research may further change our understanding of chronic pain treatment and mindfulness, but there are too few studies to allow conclusions about its effects on chronic pain.

=== Changes in the brain ===
Mindfulness meditation alters the brain, leading to a heightened ability to improve emotions. In an 8-week mindfulness meditation study, Gotink et al. results showed activity in the amygdala, insula, cingulate cortex, and hippocampus to decrease. Short-term brain changes such as these are correlated to effects seen in people who have practiced mindfulness over longer periods such as months or years. Another meta-analysis found preliminary evidence for effects in the prefrontal cortex and other brain regions associated with body awareness. However, these results should be interpreted with caution as funnel plots indicate that publication bias is an issue in meditation research. A 2016 review using 78 functional neuroimaging studies suggests that different meditation styles result in different brain activity. While other studies have found structural changes in the brain may occur, most studies have utilized weak methodology.

=== Attention and mindfulness ===
==== Attention networks and mindfulness meditation ====
Psychological and Buddhist conceptualizations of mindfulness both highlight awareness and attention training as key components in which levels of mindfulness can be cultivated with the practice of mindfulness meditation. Focused attention meditation (FAM) and open monitoring meditation (OMM) are distinct types of mindfulness meditation; FAM refers to the practice of intently maintaining focus on one object, whereas OMM is the progression of general awareness of one's surroundings while regulating thoughts. Some forms of Buddhist mindfulness meditation may lead to greater cognitive flexibility.

In an active randomized controlled study completed in 2019, participants who practiced mindfulness meditation demonstrated a greater improvement in awareness and attention than participants in the active control condition. Alpha wave neural oscillation power (which is usually associated with an alert resting state) has been shown to be increased by mindfulness in both healthy subjects and patients.

===== Sustained attention =====
Tasks of sustained attention relate to vigilance and the preparedness that aids in completing a particular task goal. Psychological research into the relationship between mindfulness meditation and the sustained attention network has revealed the following:

- In a continuous performance task an association was found between higher dispositional mindfulness and more stable maintenance of sustained attention.
- In an electroencephalography study, the attentional blink effect was reduced, and P3b ERP amplitude decreased in a group of participants who completed a mindfulness retreat. The incidence of reduced attentional blink effect relates to an increase in the detectability of a second target.
- A greater degree of attentional resources may also be reflected in faster response times in task performance, as was found for participants with higher levels of mindfulness experience.

===== Selective attention =====
- Selective attention, linked with the orientation network, selects the relevant stimuli to attend to.
- Performance in the ability to limit attention to potential sensory inputs (i.e., selective attention) was found to be higher following the completion of an eight-week MBSR course, compared to a one-month retreat and control group (with no mindfulness training). The ANT task is a general applicable task designed to test the three attention networks, in which participants are required to determine the direction of a central arrow on a computer screen. Efficiency in orienting that represent the capacity to attend to stimuli selectively was calculated by examining changes in the reaction time that accompanied cues indicating where the target occurred relative to the aid of no cues.
- Meditation experience correlates negatively with reaction times on an Eriksen flanker task measuring responses to global and local figures. Similar findings have been observed for correlations between mindfulness experience and an orienting score of response times taken from Attention Network Task performance.
- Participants who engaged in the Meditation Breath Attention Score exercise performed better on anagram tasks and reported greater focused attention on this task compared to those who did not undergo this exercise.

===== Executive control attention =====
- Executive control attention includes functions of inhibiting the conscious processing of distracting information. In the context of mindful meditation, distracting information relates to attention-grabbing mental events, such as thoughts related to the future or past.
- More than one study has reported findings of a reduced Stroop effect following mindfulness meditation training. The Stroop effect indexes interference created by having words printed in a color different from the read semantic meaning, e.g., green printed in red. However, the findings for this task are not consistently found. For instance the MBSR may differ to how mindful one becomes relative to a person who is already high in trait mindfulness.
- Using the Attention Network Task, a version of the Eriksen flanker task, it was found that error scores that indicate executive control performance were reduced in experienced meditators and following a brief five-session mindfulness training program.
- A neuroimaging study supports behavioral research findings that higher levels of mindfulness are associated with greater proficiency in inhibiting distracting information. A greater activation of the rostral anterior cingulate cortex (ACC) was shown for mindfulness meditators than matched controls.
- Participants with at least 6 years of experience meditating performed better on the Stroop Test than participants without experience meditating. The group of meditators also had lower reaction times during this test than the group of non-meditators.
- Following a Stroop test, reduced amplitude of the P300 ERP component was found for a meditation group relative to control participants. This was taken to signify that mindfulness meditation improves executive control functions of attention. An increased amplitude in the N2 ERP component was also observed in the mindfulness meditation group, which was thought to reflect more efficient perceptual discrimination in earlier stages of perceptual processing.

=== Emotion regulation and mindfulness ===
Research shows meditation practices lead to greater emotional regulation abilities. Mindfulness can help people become more aware of thoughts in the present moment, and this increased self-awareness leads to better processing and control over one's responses to surroundings or circumstances.

Positive effects of this heightened awareness include a greater sense of empathy for others, increased positive thinking patterns, and reduced anxiety. Reductions in rumination also have been found following mindfulness meditation practice, contributing to the development of positive thinking and emotional well-being.

==== Evidence of mindfulness and emotion regulation outcomes ====
Emotional reactivity can be measured and reflected in brain regions related to the production of emotions. It can also be reflected in tests of attentional performance, indexed in poorer performance in attention-related tasks. The regulation of emotional reactivity as initiated by attentional control capacities can be taxing to performance, as attentional resources are limited.

- Patients with social anxiety disorder (SAD) exhibited reduced amygdala activation in response to negative self-beliefs following an MBSR intervention program that involves mindfulness meditation practice.
- The LPP ERP component indexes arousal and is larger in amplitude for emotionally salient stimuli relative to neutral. Individuals higher in trait mindfulness showed lower LPP responses to high arousal unpleasant images. These findings suggest that individuals with higher trait mindfulness were better able to regulate emotional reactivity to emotionally evocative stimuli.
- Participants who completed a seven-week mindfulness training program demonstrated a reduction in a measure of emotional interference (measured as slower response times following the presentation of emotion relative to neutral pictures). This suggests a reduction in emotional interference.
- Following an MBSR intervention, decreases in social anxiety symptom severity and increases in bilateral parietal cortex neural correlates were found. This is thought to reflect the increased employment of inhibitory attentional control capacities to regulate emotions.
- Participants who engaged in emotion-focus meditation and breathing meditation exhibited a delayed emotional response to negatively valenced film stimuli compared to participants who did not engage in any type of meditation.

==== Controversies in mindful emotion regulation ====
It is debated as to whether top-down executive control regions such as the dorsolateral prefrontal cortex (DLPFC), are required or not to inhibit reactivity of the amygdala activation related to the production of evoked emotional responses. Arguably, an initial increase in activation of executive control regions developed during mindfulness training may lessen with increasing mindfulness expertise.

Furthermore, current research data is inconclusive and incomplete in linking the positive effects of mindful meditation with a variety of reported positive effects. Additional high-fidelity studies are needed before a complete understanding of the full effects of mindfulness can be reached.

=== Stress reduction ===
Research has shown stress reduction benefits from mindfulness. A 2019 study tested the effects of meditation on the psychological well-being, work stress, and blood pressure of employees working in the United Kingdom. One group of participants was instructed to meditate once a day using a smartphone mindfulness app, while the control group did not engage in meditation. Measurements of well-being, stress, and perceived workplace support were taken for both groups before the intervention and then again after four months. Based on self-report questionnaires, the participants who engaged in meditation showed a significant increase in psychological well-being and perceived workplace support. The meditators also reported a significant decrease in anxiety and stress levels.

Another study conducted to understand the association between mindfulness, perceived stress, and work engagement indicated that mindfulness was associated with lower perceived stress and higher work engagement.

An additional study from 2021 looking at the effect of centering meditation intervention on stress levels of college students saw a statistically significant improvement in stress and mindfulness levels over time. Inclusive of this was the finding that it helped reduce stress and the variance of that stress on a participant-to-participant basis.

Other research shows decreased stress levels in people who engage in meditation after shorter periods of time as well. Evidence of significant stress reduction was found after only three weeks of meditation intervention. Brief, daily meditation sessions can alter one's behavioral response to stressors, improving coping mechanisms and decreasing the adverse impact caused by stress. A study from 2016 examined anxiety and emotional states of naive meditators before and after a seven-day meditation retreat in Thailand. Results displayed a significant reduction in perceived stress after this traditional Buddhist meditation retreat.

Cancer diagnosis and treatment often comes with psychological complications; as an example, rates of psychological distress in breast cancer patients in China was a staggering 49%. A meta-analysis of 869 studies saw that Mindfulness-based stress reduction resulted in significant decreases of anxiety and depression levels in cancer patients.

=== Insomnia and sleep ===
Chronic insomnia is often associated with anxious hyperarousal and frustration over the inability to sleep. Mindfulness has been shown to reduce insomnia and improve sleep quality, although self-reported measures show larger effects than objective measures.

A 2008 study looked at the combination of meditation and cognitive behavioral therapy in treating those meeting the diagnostic criteria for psychophysiological insomnia. Results after the 6-week intervention showed statistically significant improvements in pre-sleep arousal, sleep-related distress, and insomnia.

Sleep disturbance is a common symptom of cancer that many patients face, with incidence rates ranging anywhere from 30 - 90%. A 2023 meta-analysis looking at the relationship between meditation and cancer-related sleep disturbance saw significant immediate effects in patients on self-reported sleep disturbance levels.

=== Meditation And Cancer ===
Cancer itself and the treatment patients go through often comes with varying side effects including fatigue, nausea, sleep disturbance, pain, and others. Over the past few decades, the connection between meditation and its effect on cancer has been a topic of interest for researchers. Mindfulness meditation, in particular, has been shown to influence health outcomes associated with cancer diagnosis and treatment, including pain, mental health and sleep disturbance, which have susceptibility to play off of one another.

==== Pain ====
Pain is a common side effect of cancer patients, with 30-50% of patients experiencing moderate to severe levels. Mindfulness-based cognitive therapy was found to garner statistically significant effects in regards to self-reported pain levels in cancer patients after 8 weeks. Inclusive of this was another finding that pain severity may be lowered through mindfulness-based interventions. Research saw that mindfulness meditation may additionally be effective in pain management as the patient's report of the pain can be lessened through diverting their attention away from the symptoms, thus increasing pain tolerance. Though studies have brought about significant evidence of meditation's effect on pain management, scholars believe that it should not be used as a mainstay treatment for cancer pain without further research.

==== Mental Health ====
Cancer diagnosis and treatment often comes with psychological complications; as an example, rates of psychological distress in breast cancer patients in China was a staggering 49%. Armed with this information, researchers began to look into interventions to help alleviate the mental suffering of patients, including meditation. When regarding cancer-related effects on mental health, a meta-analysis of 869 studies saw that Mindfulness-based stress reduction resulted in lower anxiety and depression levels in cancer patients as well as improvement in physical functioning. In a review of 29 randomized controlled trials looking into nonpharmacological mediations for impairment of cognition relating to cancer, meditation was found to be the best option when compared to other interventions including yoga, acupuncture, and cognitive training.

==== Sleep Disturbance ====
Sleep disturbance is a common symptom of cancer that many patients face, with incidence rates ranging anywhere from 30 - 90%. Disturbances in sleep have been found to result in other consequences such as stress, fatigue, and cognitive impairment. Research has been conducted on the connection between meditation and sleep disturbance to see if it is deemed effective as an intervention. A meta analysis of 56 studies saw mindfulness to result in significant immediate effects on sleep disturbance. Additional results yielded statistically significant short-term effects on sleep in patients when compared to education and breath control. Sleep disturbance was found to be relieved in patients who underwent mindfulness-based intervention. When accounting for longevity, a meta-analysis found the effects of mindfulness on sleep to last around 6 months.

=== Future directions ===
A large part of mindfulness research is dependent on technology. As new technology develops, new imaging techniques will become helpful in this field. Real-time fMRI might give immediate feedback and guide participants through the programs. It could also be used to train and evaluate mental states more easily during meditation itself.

== Effects of other types of meditation ==
=== Insight (Vipassana) meditation ===
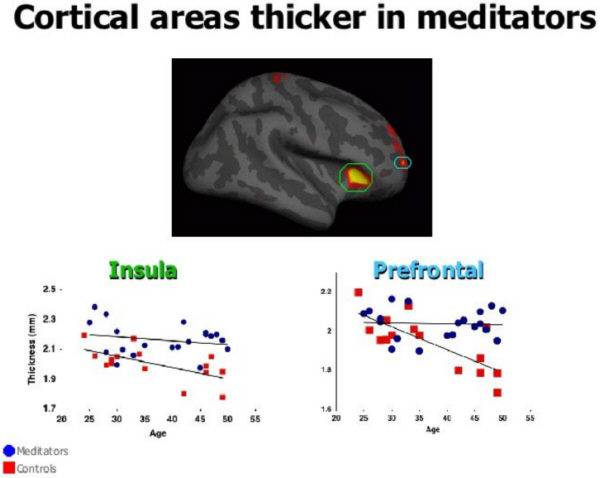

Vipassana or "insight" meditation is a form of mindfulness meditation attributed within the Buddhist tradition to the Buddha Gautama. The practice aims to increase a sense of awareness of the present moment. The practitioner becomes a quiet observer of their thoughts, emotions, and sensations; allowing them to come and go without passing judgement. A plethora of evidence now exists to suggest that vipassana meditation does indeed lead to increased mindfulness, but the benefits of the practice do not stop there. It has also been found to reduce stress and increase both self-kindness and overall well-being.

Electroencephalography studies on Vipassana meditators seemed to indicate significant increase in parieto-occipital gamma rhythms in experienced meditators (35–45 Hz). In another study conducted by NIMHANS on Vipassana meditators, researchers found readings associated with improved cognitive processing after a session of meditation, with distinct and graded difference in the readings between novice meditators and experienced meditators.

Khoury and colleagues (2017) conducted a meta-analysis including a total of 21 studies and 2,912 participants. The study aimed to evaluate the effects of traditional vipassana meditation retreats in various populations including advanced meditators, novice meditators, and incarcerated individuals. More specifically, it explored the psychological outcomes including anxiety symptoms, depressive symptoms, and stress following the retreats, evaluated the impacts of the retreats on levels of mindfulness, and explored variables moderating the effectiveness of traditional retreats. Results suggested that traditional vipassana meditation retreats were moderately effective at improving psychological outcomes, with novice meditators and members of the general population experiencing particularly large reductions in anxiety, depression, and stress when compared to both experienced meditators and incarcerated individuals. Moreover, the results suggested an increased capacity for emotional regulation, acceptance, compassion, and mindfulness as well as higher quality of life scores following the retreats across all populations. These results held steady even at follow-up.

An essential component to the Vipassana mediation approach is the focus on awareness, referring to bodily sensations and psychological status. In a study conducted by Zeng et al. (2013), awareness was described as the acknowledgement of consciousness which is monitoring all aspects of the environment. This definition differentiates the concept of awareness from mindfulness. The emphasis on awareness, and the way it assists in monitoring emotion, is unique to this meditative practice.

=== Kundalini yoga ===
Kundalini yoga has proved to increase the prevention of cognitive decline and evaluate the response of biomarkers to treatment, thereby shedding light on the underlying mechanisms of the link between Kundalini Yoga and cognitive impairment. For the study, 81 participants aged 55 and older who had subjective memory complaints and met criteria for mild cognitive impairment, indicated by a total score of 0.5 on the Clinical Dementia Rating Scale. The results showed that at 12 weeks, both the yoga group showed significant improvements in recall memory and visual memory and showed a significant sustained improvement in memory up to the 24-week follow-up, the yoga group showed significant improvement in verbal fluency and sustained significant improvements in executive functioning at week 24. In addition, the yoga cohort showed significant improvement in depressive symptoms, apathy, and resilience from emotional stress. This research was provided by Helen Lavretsky, M.D. and colleagues. In another study, Kundalini Yoga did not show significant effectiveness in treating obsessive-compulsive disorders compared with Relaxation/Meditation.

=== Sahaja yoga and mental silence ===
Sahaja yoga meditation is regarded as a mental silence meditation, and has been shown to correlate with particular brain and brain wave characteristics. One study has led to suggestions that Sahaja meditation involves 'switching off' irrelevant brain networks for the maintenance of focused internalized attention and inhibition of inappropriate information. Sahaja meditators appear to benefit from lower depression and scored above control group for emotional well-being and mental health measures on SF-36 ratings.

A study comparing practitioners of Sahaja Yoga meditation with a group of non-meditators doing a simple relaxation exercise, measured a drop in skin temperature in the meditators compared to a rise in skin temperature in the non-meditators as they relaxed. The researchers noted that all other meditation studies that have observed skin temperature have recorded increases and none have recorded a decrease in skin temperature. This suggests that Sahaja Yoga meditation, being a mental silence approach, may differ both experientially and physiologically from simple relaxation.

=== Transcendental Meditation ===
In a 2006 review, Transcendental Meditation proved comparable with other kinds of relaxation therapies in reducing anxiety. In another 2006 review, study participants demonstrated a one Hertz reduction in electroencephalography alpha wave frequency relative to controls.

A 2012 meta-analysis published in Psychological Bulletin, which reviewed 163 individual studies, found that Transcendental Meditation performed no better overall than other meditation techniques in improving psychological variables.

A 2013 statement from the American Heart Association said that Transcendental Meditation could be considered as a treatment for hypertension, although other interventions such as exercise and device-guided breathing were more effective and better supported by clinical evidence.

A 2014 review found moderate evidence for improvement in anxiety, depression and pain with low evidence for improvement in stress and mental health-related quality of life.

Transcendental Meditation may reduce blood pressure, according to a 2015 review that compared it to control groups. A trend over time indicated that practicing Transcendental Meditation may lower blood pressure. Such effects are comparable to other lifestyle interventions. Conflicting findings across reviews and a potential risk of bias indicated the necessity of further evidence.

=== Effects of loving, kindness, and compassion ===
Several meta-analyses have examined the effects of mindful meditation on one's loving, kindness, and compassionate disposition and behaviors. Significant increases in self-reported self-compassion. Compassion, and well-being were reported alongside decreases in depression and anxiety. Another study indicated an increase in positive emotions. There may be further benefits that are yet to be discovered, with only preliminary data on mindfulness and mediation. Further studies and explorations into the effects of mindful meditation on the self are needed to draw further conclusions.

=== Guided meditation ===
Benefits of guided meditation include lower levels of stress, reducing asthmatic episodes, physical pain, insomnia, episodic anger, negative or irrational thinking, and anxiety, as well as improving coping skills, focus, and a general feeling of well-being.

== Research on unspecified or multiple types of meditation ==
=== Brain activity ===
The medial prefrontal and posterior cingulate cortices have been found to be relatively deactivated during meditation by experienced meditators using concentration, loving-kindness, and choiceless awareness meditation. In addition experienced meditators were found to have stronger coupling between the posterior cingulate, dorsal anterior cingulate, and dorsolateral prefrontal cortices both when meditating and when not meditating. Over time meditation can actually increase the integrity of both gray and white matter. The added amount of gray matter found in the brain stem after meditation improves communication between the cortex and all other areas within the brain. Meditation often stimulates a large network of cortical regions including the frontal and parietal regions, lateral occipital lobe, the insular cortex, thalamic nuclei, basal ganglia, and the cerebellum region in the brain. These parts of the brain are connected with attention and the default network of the brain which is associated to day dreaming.

Strengthening of the caudate has been found in avid meditators and yogis.

In addition, both meditation and yoga have been found to have impacts on the brain, specifically the caudate. Strengthening of the caudate has been shown in meditators as well as yogis. The increased connectedness of the caudate has potential to be responsible for the improved well-being that is associated with yoga and meditation.

=== Changes in the brain ===
Meditation is under preliminary research to assess possible changes in grey matter concentrations.

Published research suggests that meditation can facilitate neuroplasticity and connectivity in brain regions specifically related to emotion regulation and attention.

=== Attention and mind wandering ===
Non-directive forms of meditation where the meditator lets their mind wander freely can actually produce higher levels of activity in the default mode network when compared to a resting state or having the brain in a neutral place. These Non directive forms of meditation allows the meditators to have better control over thoughts during everyday activities or when focusing on specific task due to a reduced frustration at the brains mind wandering process. When given a specific task, meditation can allow quicker response to changing environmental stimuli. Meditation can allow the brain to decrease attention to unwanted responses of irrelevant environmental stimuli and a reduces the Stroop effect. Those who meditate have regularly demonstrated more control on what they focus their attention on while maintaining a mindful awareness on what is around them. Experienced meditators have been shown to have an increased ability when it comes to conflict monitoring and find it easier to switch between competing stimuli. Those who practice meditation experience an increase of attentional resources in the brain and steady meditation practice can lead to the reduction of the attentional blink due to a decreased mental exertion when identifying important stimuli.

=== Perception ===
Studies have shown that meditation has both short-term and long-term effects on various perceptual faculties. In 1984 a study showed that meditators have a significantly lower detection threshold for light stimuli of short duration. In 2000 a study of the perception of visual illusions by zen masters, novice meditators, and non-meditators showed statistically significant effects found for the Poggendorff Illusion but not for the Müller-Lyer Illusion. The zen masters experienced a statistically significant reduction in initial illusion (measured as error in millimeters) and a lower decrement in illusion for subsequent trials. Tloczynski has described the theory of mechanism behind the changes in perception that accompany mindfulness meditation thus: "A person who meditates consequently perceives objects more as directly experienced stimuli and less as concepts… With the removal or minimization of cognitive stimuli and generally increasing awareness, meditation can therefore influence both the quality (accuracy) and quantity (detection) of perception." Brown points to this as a possible explanation of the phenomenon: "[the higher rate of detection of single light flashes] involves quieting some of the higher mental processes which normally obstruct the perception of subtle events." In other words, the practice may temporarily or permanently alter some of the top-down processing involved in filtering subtle events usually deemed noise by the perceptual filters.

=== Memory ===
Meditation enhances memory capacity specifically in the working memory and increases executive functioning by helping participants better understand what is happening moment for moment. Those who meditate regularly have demonstrated the ability to better process and distinguish important information from the working memory and store it into long-term memory with more accuracy than those who do not practice meditation techniques. Meditation may be able to expand the amount of information that can be held within working memory and by so doing is able to improve IQ scores and increase individual intelligence. The encoding process for both audio and visual information has been shown to be more accurate and detailed when meditation is used. Though there are limited studies on meditation's effects on long-term memory, because of meditations ability to increase attentional awareness, episodic long-term memory is believed to be more vivid and accurate for those who meditate regularly. Meditation has also shown to decrease memory complaints from those with Alzheimer's disease which also suggests the benefits meditation could have on episodic long-term memory which is linked to Alzheimer's.

=== Calming and relaxation ===
Electroencephalography activity slows as a result of meditation. Some types of meditation may lead to a calming effect by reducing sympathetic nervous system activity while increasing parasympathetic nervous system activity. Or, equivalently, that meditation produces a reduction in arousal and increase in relaxation.

Herbert Benson, founder of the Mind-Body Medical Institute, which is affiliated with Harvard University and several Boston hospitals, reports that meditation induces a host of biochemical and physical changes in the body collectively referred to as the "relaxation response". The relaxation response includes changes in metabolism, heart rate, respiration, blood pressure and brain chemistry. Benson and his team have also done clinical studies at Buddhist monasteries in the Himalayan Mountains. Benson wrote The Relaxation Response to document the benefits of meditation, which in 1975 were not yet widely known.

=== Aging ===
There is no good evidence to indicate that meditation affects the brain in aging.

=== Happiness and emotional well-being ===
Studies have shown meditators may have higher happiness than control groups, although this may be due to non-specific factors such as meditators having better general self-care.

Preliminary research indicates a possible relationship between the volume of gray matter in the right precuneus area of the brain and both meditation and the subject's subjective happiness score. A recent study found that participants who engaged in a body-scan meditation for about 20 minutes self-reported higher levels of happiness and decrease in anxiety compared to participants who just rested during the 20-minute time span. These results suggest that an increase in awareness of one's body through meditation causes a state of selflessness and a feeling of connectedness. This result then leads to reports of positive emotions.

=== Pain ===
Meditation has been shown to reduce pain perception. An intervention known as mindfulness-based pain management (MBPM) has been subject to a range of studies demonstrating its effectiveness.

== Adverse effects and limits of meditation and mindfulness ==
Meditation and mindfulness have also been correlated with unpleasant experiences, but the potential for adverse effects from meditation has received limited attention in scientific articles and the popular press. One in-depth investigation was produced by the Financial Times, and published in 2024 as a five-part podcast, entitled "Untold: The Retreat". In the podcast, the FT's special investigations editor Madison Marriage looks at claims of harm from people who had attended Goenka Vipassana retreats.

=== Contemplative traditions ===
According to Farias et al. (2020) the most common adverse effects of meditation are anxiety and depression. Other adverse affects may include depersonalization or altered sense of self or the world, distorted emotions or thoughts, and, in a few cases, visual and auditory psychosis, and with pre-existing historical factors suicide.

Schlosser et al. (2019) reported that, of 1,232 regular meditators with at least two months of meditation experience, about a quarter reported having had particularly unpleasant meditation-related experiences (such as anxiety, fear, distorted emotions or thoughts, altered sense of self or the world), which they thought may have been caused by their meditation practice. Meditators with high levels of repetitive negative thinking and those who only engage in deconstructive meditation were more likely to report unpleasant side effects. Adverse effects were less frequently reported in women and religious meditators.

Meditation also has an addictive potential as it both offers biochemical rewards and socially acceptable avenues for escapism (like internet use, social media, substance abuse). Using spiritual ideas and practices "to sidestep or avoid facing unresolved emotional issues, psychological wounds, and unfinished developmental tasks" is known as Spiritual bypass, a term introduced in the mid 1980s by John Welwood, a Buddhist teacher and psychotherapist.

"Zen sickness", exhaustion caused by prolonged intense practice and self-neglect is described by Hakuin and Bankei.

=== Mindfulness ===
In recent years both the soundness of the scientific foundations and the desirability of the societal effects of mindfulness have been questioned.

Britton et al. (2019), in a study on the effects of mindfulness-based programs (MBPs), found negative side-effects in 37% of the sample while lasting bad effects in 6–14% of the sample. Most of the side effects were related to signs of dysregulated arousal (i.e., hyperarousal and dissociation). The majority of these adverse events occurred as a result of regular practice at home or during class something that challenges the notion that it is only intense practice that can give rise to negative experiences; as it turns out intense all-day retreats or working with difficulty practice accounts for only 6% of adverse effects. The symptoms most readily recognized as negative were those of hyperarousal (e.g., anxiety and insomnia). On the other hand, while dissociation symptoms (e.g., emotional blunting, derealization, and self-disturbance) were both less frequent and less likely to be appraised as negative, they were still associated with more than 5–10 times greater risk for lasting bad effects. This means that re-appraisal of dissociative symptoms via non-judgmental acceptance is not sufficient to prevent impairment in functioning and should not constitute the only response. Instead, training in how to recognize dissociative symptoms as potential indicators of the need for intervention, which have recently been added to some mindfulness teacher training programs may be important.

There is also mounting evidence that mindfulness can disturb various prosocial behaviors. By blunting emotions, in particular the social emotions of guilt and shame, it may produce deficits in the feelings of empathy and remorse thus creating calm but callous practitioners. Hafenbrack et al. (2022), in a study on mindfulness with 1400 participants, found that focused-breathing meditation can dampen the relationship between transgressions and the desire to engage in reparative prosocial behaviors. Poullin et al. (2021) found that mindfulness can increase the trait of selfishness. The study, consisting of two interrelated parts and totaling 691 participants, found that a mindfulness induction, compared to a control condition, led to decreased prosocial behavior. This effect was moderated by self-construals such that people with relatively independent self-construals became less prosocial while people with relatively interdependent self-construals became more so. In the western world where independent self-construals generally predominate meditation may thus have potentially detrimental effects.

These new findings about mindfulness' socially problematic effects imply that it can be contraindicated to use mindfulness as a tool to handle acute personal conflicts or relational difficulties; in the words of Andrew Hafenbrack, one of the authors of the study, "If we 'artificially' reduce our guilt by meditating it away, we may end up with worse relationships, or even fewer relationships". In line with this, a meta-analysis by Kreplin et al. (2018) concluded that meditation only has a limited effect in increasing prosocial behaviours (e.g., empathy, compassion).

Mindfulness is not helpful if it used to avoid facing ongoing problems or emerging crises in the meditator's life, in which case it will function as just another form of experiential avoidance and potentially exacerbate the crisis. In such situations, it may instead be helpful to apply mindful attitudes while actively engaging with current problems. According to the NIH, meditation and mindfulness should not be used as a replacement for conventional health care or as a reason to postpone seeing a doctor.

=== Support ===
Organizations such as Cheetah House and Meditating in Safety document research on problems arising in meditation, and offer help for meditators in distress or those recovering from meditation-related health problems. In some cases, adverse effects may be attributed to "improper use of meditation" or the aggravation of a preexisting condition; however, developing research in this area suggests the need for deeper engagement with the causes of severe distress, which previous "meditation teachers have perhaps too quickly and rather insensitively dismissed as pre-existing or unrelated psychopathology". Where meditation is prescribed or offered as a treatment,

principles of informed consent require that treatment choice be based in part on the balance of benefits to harms, and therefore can only be made if harms are adequately measured and known.

== Difficulties in the scientific study of meditation ==
=== Weaknesses in historic meditation and mindfulness research ===
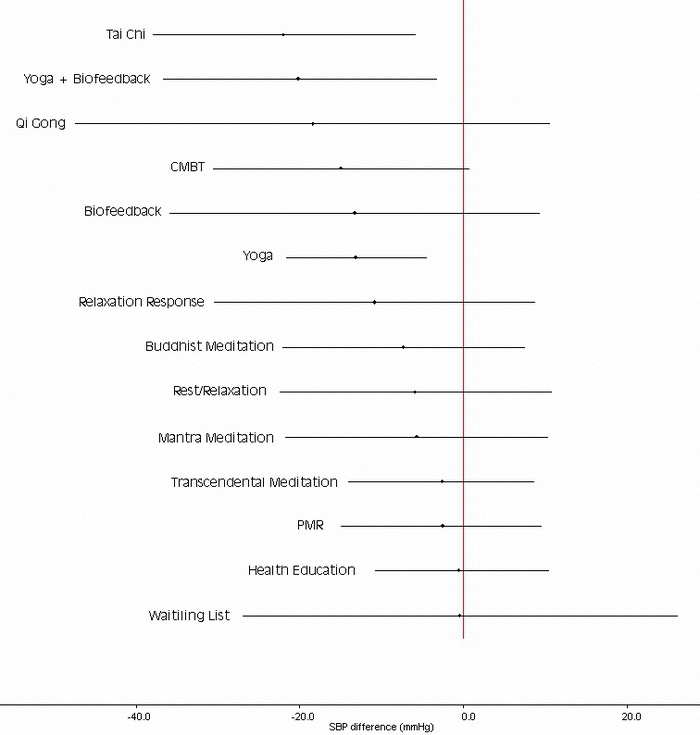
A comparison of the effect of various meditation techniques on systolic blood pressure

In June 2007, the United States National Center for Complementary and Integrative Health published an independent, peer-reviewed, meta-analysis of the state of meditation research, conducted by researchers at the University of Alberta Evidence-based Practice Center. The report reviewed 813 studies involving five broad categories of meditation: mantra meditation, mindfulness meditation, yoga, tai chi, and qigong, and included all studies on adults through September 2005, with a particular focus on research pertaining to hypertension, cardiovascular disease, and substance abuse. The report concluded:

Scientific research on meditation practices does not appear to have a common theoretical perspective and is characterized by poor methodological quality. Future research on meditation practices must be more rigorous in the design and execution of studies and in the analysis and reporting of results. (p. 6)

It noted that there is no theoretical explanation of health effects from meditation common to all meditation techniques.

A version of this report subsequently published in the Journal of Alternative and Complementary Medicine in 2008 stated: "Most clinical trials on meditation practices are generally characterized by poor methodological quality with significant threats to validity in every major quality domain assessed." This was despite a statistically significant increase in quality of all reviewed meditation research, in general, over time between 1956 and 2005. Of the 400 clinical studies, 10% were found to be good quality. A call was made for rigorous study of meditation. These authors also noted that this finding is not unique to the area of meditation research and that the quality of reporting is a frequent problem in other areas of complementary and alternative medicine (CAM) research and related therapy research domains.

Of more than 3,000 scientific studies that were found in a comprehensive search of 17 relevant databases, only about 4% had randomised controlled trials (RCTs), which are designed to exclude the placebo effect.

In a 2013 meta-analysis, Awasthi argued that meditation is defined poorly and despite the research studies showing clinical efficacy, exact mechanisms of action remain unclear. A 2017 commentary was similarly mixed, with concerns including the particular characteristics of individuals who tend to participate in mindfulness and meditation research.

=== Position statements ===
A 2013 statement from the American Heart Association evaluated the evidence for the effectiveness of Transcendental Meditation as a treatment for hypertension as "unknown/unclear/uncertain or not well-established", and stated: "Because of many negative studies or mixed results and a paucity of available trials... other meditation techniques are not recommended in clinical practice to lower BP at this time." According to the American Heart Association, while there are promising results about the impact of meditation in reducing blood pressure and managing insomnia, depression and anxiety, it is not a replacement for healthy lifestyle changes and is not a substitute for effective medication.

=== Methodological obstacles ===
The term meditation encompasses a wide range of practices and interventions rooted in different traditions, but research literature has sometimes failed to adequately specify the nature of the particular meditation practice(s) being studied. Different forms of meditation practice may yield different results depending on the factors being studied.

The presence of a number of intertwined factors including the effects of meditation, the theoretical orientation of how meditation practices are taught, the cultural background of meditators, and generic group effects complicates the task of isolating the effects of meditation:

Numerous studies have demonstrated the beneficial effects of a variety of meditation practices. It has been unclear to what extent these practices share neural correlates. Interestingly, a recent study compared electroencephalogram activity during a focused-attention and open monitoring meditation practice from practitioners of two Buddhist traditions. The researchers found that the differences between the two meditation traditions were more pronounced than the differences between the two types of meditation. These data are consistent with our findings that theoretical orientation of how a practice is taught strongly influences neural activity during these practices. However, the study used long-term practitioners from different cultures, which may have confounded the results.

== See also ==
- Buddhism and psychology
- Neuroplasticity

== Sources ==
Printed sources

- Farias M, Maraldi E, Wallenkampf KC, Lucchetti G (2020). "Adverse events in meditation practices and meditation-based therapies: a systematic review". Acta Psychiatrica Scandinavica. 142 (5): 374–393. doi:10.1111/acps.13225. PMID 32820538.
- Fossella T, Welwood J (Spring 2011). "Human nature, buddha nature: an interview with John Welwood" (PDF). Tricycle: The Buddhist Review. 20 (3).
- Perez-De-Albeniz A, Holmes J (2000). "Meditation: Concepts, effects and uses in therapy". International Journal of Psychotherapy. 5 (1): 49–58. doi:10.1080/13569080050020263.
- Shapiro Jr DH (1992). "Adverse Effects of Meditation: A Preliminary Investigation of Long-Term Meditators" (PDF). International Journal of Psychosomatics. 39 (1–4): 63. PMID 1428622.

Web-sources
