= Suzanne Segal =

American writer and teacher (1955–1997)

- Born: 1955
- Died: 1997 (aged 41–42)
- Education: UC Berkeley, Wright Institute
- Known for: Spiritual writing and teaching, descriptions of self-realization

Suzanne Segal (1955–1997) was an American writer and teacher about spiritual experience, known for her sudden experience of self-realization which she wrote about in her book Collision With the Infinite: A Life Beyond the Personal Self. In addition to gaining note in the spiritual community, Segal became a model case of the dissociative condition known as depersonalization derealization disorder (DPDR). Along her journey some therapists formally diagnosed her with DPDR, while others did not have clear explanations.

== Early life ==
Segal's childhood was filled with attempts to evoke a state of psychological detachment from her identity. She experienced moments which she described as "vastness" after repeating her name as a mantra. She started studying Transcendental Meditation and found the experience similarly awakening, but left the organization when she began to dislike the rigidity of the format. Segal moved to California and received a degree in English from the UC Berkeley. She then moved to Paris, where she had a daughter, and where her marked depersonalization experience began. In the fall of 1986 she enrolled in the John F. Kennedy University in their clinical psychology masters program transferring to the Wright Institute's PhD program in the fall of 1987. She completed her dissertation and received her doctorate in psychology in 1991.

== Enlightenment experience ==
One day in 1982, while boarding a bus in Paris, the 27-year-old Segal experienced a sudden shift in her consciousness. She described the experience in her book, Collisions With the Infinite. Segal described this first period of her experience as "witnessing", since she was aware of herself but also critically detached from it. In the years after her break Segal continued to function with seeming normalcy, completing a doctorate in psychology at the Wright Institute. She continued to feel completely depersonalized, literally as if her own name did not refer to anyone. Segal's state of mind terrified her, and she sought advice from California's Buddhist community. Buddhism intentionally cultivates loss of ego and a sense of emptiness and oneness, and spiritual teachers tried to help Segal see her condition positively. Several even congratulated her.

Twelve years after her initial break, Segal dramatically entered another phase of her experience. This sense of cognitive and spiritual oneness remained with Segal for two years, up through the publishing of Collisions in 1996.

== Spirituality ==
Segal's story received attention by many writers and publications. Collisions was reviewed by Yoga Journal magazine in 1997, the reviewer writing, "This frank and engaging account is a fascinating view of the unfolding of a realization without a spiritual practice or intention."

The 2004 book The Biology of Transcendence tried to characterize Segal's state of mind during her second phase of union: "[It was] fusion with 'the vastness' and her discovery that the vastness perceived its universe through her own sensory system, which was at that point the sensory system of the vastness itself ... [she] essentially perceived the universe perceiving itself, but without her, that perception did not exist."

A 2008 graduate dissertation by Arvin Paul used Segal's experience as an example of "Shift/s in the Locus of Identity Upon Initial Awakening", "a shift from the conventional sense of self to the uninvolved witness, and/or allpervasive presence, and/or boundless spaciousness, and/or pure awareness, and/or Being, and/or emptiness/void, and/or the Self, and/or the simple recognition of nonseparateness."

Segal was interviewed for the chapter devoted to her in the 2003 book The Awakening West by Lynn Marie Lumiere and John Lumiere-Wins.

== Experience with depersonalization disorder ==
After her initial break, Segal sought to determine what had happened to her and consulted various psychologists and psychiatrists. Though some had no clear explanation for the experience, one labelled it depersonalization disorder, stating "I don't know what else it could be but symptoms of depersonalization". Segal went on to read up on depersonalization, derealization, and dissociation, finding some related to her experience but none were a perfect fit and they ultimately failed to capture the sensation of lacking a self in conjunction with normal, or even improved functioning.

Segal's story was profiled in the 2006 book Feeling Unreal: Depersonalization Disorder and the Loss of the Self by Daphne Simeon and Jeffrey Abugel. It was suggested for a book review in The Journal of the American Psychological Association that rather than representing depersonalization, Segal's experiences may represent a dissociative disorder.

Suzanne spent that fall at her home in Stinson Beach, California. During this period she recovered memories of childhood abuse. Stranger documented this period as a retreat from the earlier spiritual themes that had defined her experience. "As a psychologist, she was well tutored in a possible ramification of childhood abuse—dissociation. Once again, Segal began to perceive things differently, this time from the psychological viewpoint rather than that of transcendent spirituality."

== Death ==
By February 1997, at the age of 42, her physical and mental capabilities began to quickly decline. She entered the hospital on February 27, and doctors discovered a malignant brain tumor, having surgery but refusing chemotherapy or radiation. On March 10 she married her fiancé Steve Kruszynski. After the wedding they traveled to Oklahoma to seek out alternative treatments, but Segal's debilitation returned during the trip and they had to return home, and she entered a coma several days later. She died on the morning of Tuesday, April 1. Members of the spiritual and psychological community went on to debate the significance of her experience. In the afterword to the 1998 edition of Collisions, Bodian gave his personal opinion, "Those of us who were close to Suzanne never doubted the depth or the authenticity of her realization."

== See also ==
- Spiritual bypass
