= Mary C. Lamia =

American psychologist, psychoanalyst, professor, and author

Mary C Lamia
- Citizenship: American
- Education: PhD, California School of Professional Psychology, 1977
- Occupations: Author & Psychologist
- Website: https://marylamia.com

Mary Lamia is an American psychologist, psychoanalyst, and author. Her work conveys an understanding of emotion and its significant role in motivation, identity, and behavior.

== Biography ==
She authored Grief Isn’t Something to Get Over: Finding a Home for Memories and Emotions After Losing a Loved One in which she demonstrates how emotional responses experienced in grief often follow the recall of positive emotional memories. Her co-authored book, The Upside of Shame: Therapeutic Interventions Using the Positive Aspects of a “Negative” Emotion, illustrates there is much more to shame than its reputation as a negative emotional state. This clinical book delves into the role of shame in many complex issues, such as personality disorders, anxiety, depression, and addictions. She published What Motivates Getting Things Done: Procrastination, Emotions, and Success, exploring the emotional lives of people who are successful in their endeavors—both procrastinators and non-procrastinators alike—to illustrate how the human motivational system works, why people respond to it differently, and how everyone can use their natural style of getting things done to their advantage. Her book, Emotions! Making Sense of Your Feelings, Lamia conveys how emotions are a powerful and extraordinary part of being human and serve as an instant cueing system to inform us about situations and motivate us to take action.

Her book for children, Understanding Myself: A Kid’s Guide to Intense Emotions and Strong Feelings. The book informs children about emotions and includes real-life stories from kids, interesting facts, and feeling quizzes. Another co-authored book, The White Knight Syndrome: Rescuing Yourself from Your Need to Rescue Others, focuses on people who enter into romantic relationships with damaged and vulnerable partners, hoping that love will transform their partner's behavior or life, yet this relationship pattern seldom leads to a storybook ending.

Lamia hosted a weekly call-in talk show for children, KidTalk with Dr. Mary, on Radio Disney stations for nine years. Lamia's blog posts for Psychology Today illustrate her endeavor to convey an understanding of emotion and its significant role in who we become. She is also a faculty member in the doctoral program of the Wright Institute in Berkeley and has a private practice in Kentfield, California.
