= Our Body =

Our Body may refer to:

- Our Body (2018 film), South Korean drama film
- Our Body (2023 film), French documentary film

== See also ==
- Our Bodies, Ourselves, a book about women's health and sexuality
- Our Bodies Our Doctors, a 2019 American documentary film
