= Clint Miller (musician) =

American musician and writer (born 1984)

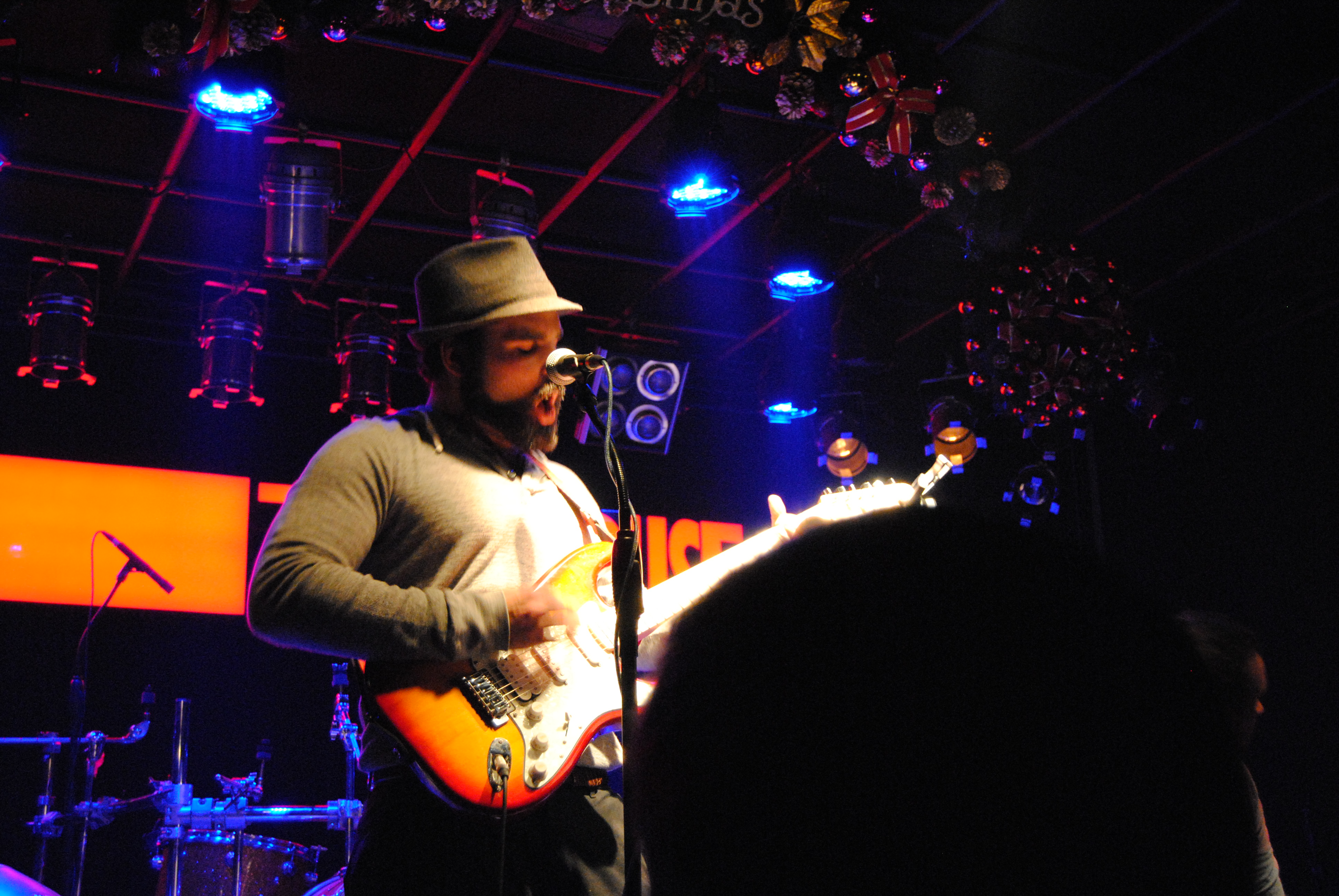
- Clint Miller live, 2013

Background information
- Born: Clinton Wray Miller; August 11, 1984
- Origin: Abingdon, Virginia, United States
- Genres: Blues, jazz, folk
- Occupations: Entertainer, producer, writer, researcher
- Instruments: Vocals, guitar, piano, harmonica, violin, dobro, banjo, mandolin, cello, lap steel, ukulele, clarinet, sax
- Years active: 1999–present
- Labels: Clint Miller Music, Ambitco
- Website: www.theclintmiller.com

Clint Miller (born August 11, 1984) is an American musician and writer.

== Music ==
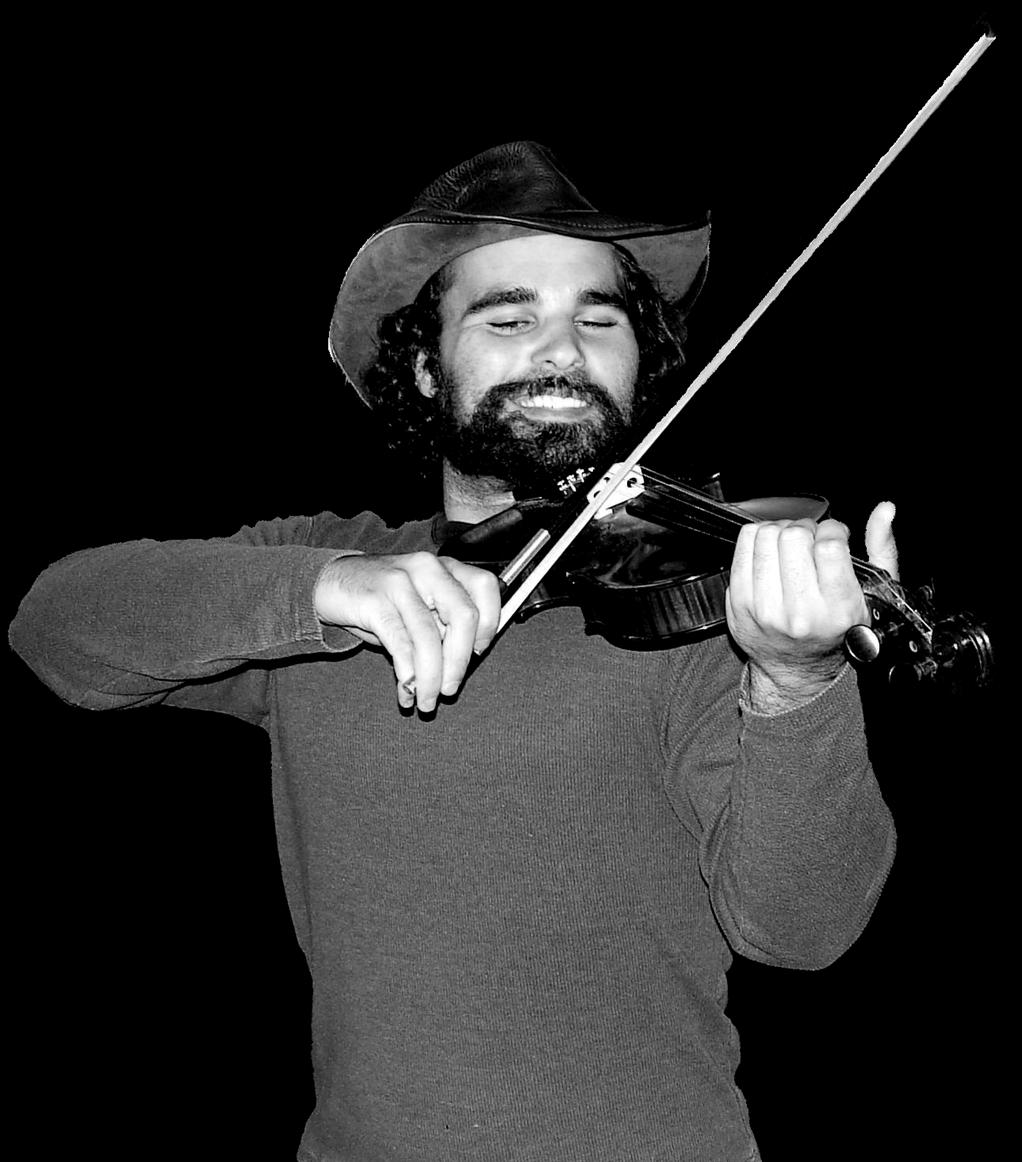
Clint Miller playing fiddle, 2007

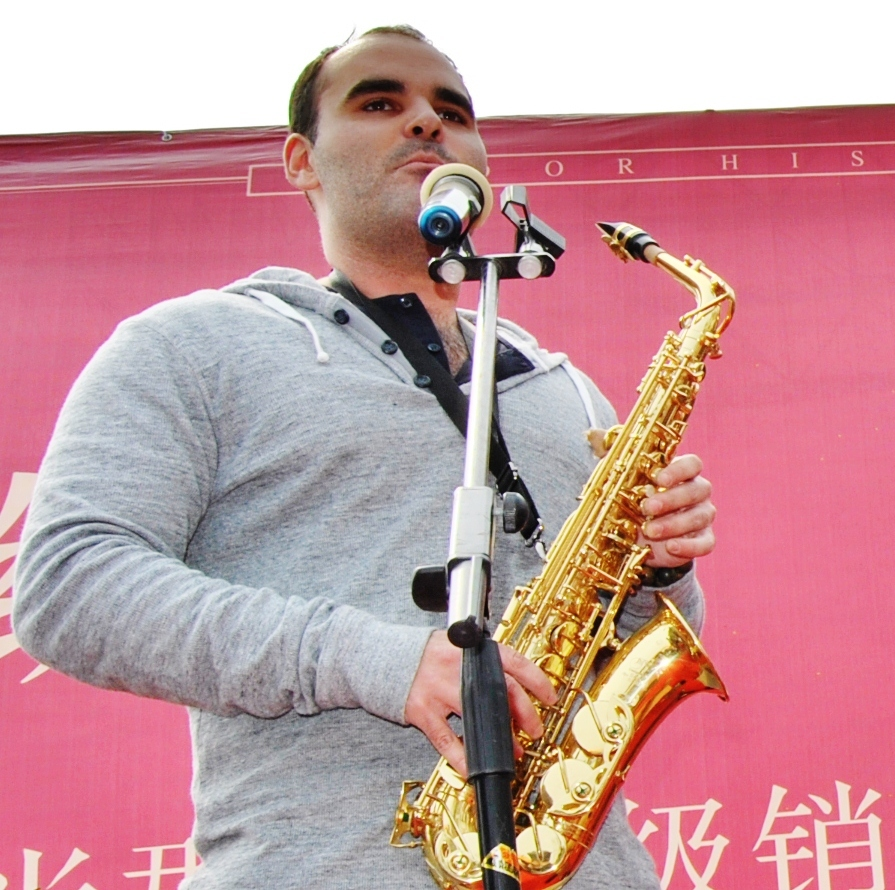
Clint Miller in Xuchang, 2013

Miller released Ballad of a Modern Day Cowboy: a Tragedy in Three Acts through his own independent label in 2006. In the United Kingdom, music critic Del Day noted, “There are few braver and indeed industrious records than this being released these days... given that there are elements of country, blues, soul, jazz and bluegrass here and that Miller plays no less than fourteen instruments overall.” American historian, reporter, and music critic Joe Tennis described Miller's vocal work as “a perfect vehicle for these 21 tales of woe on the road.” In the Netherlands, music critic Wim Bolujt wrote, “Hoe origineel en goed gespeeld ook…” (“How original and well played too…”). Appalachian music critic Mike Clark wrote, “He’s one heck of a musician as well, playing almost every instrument heard on Ballad of a Modern Day Cowboy… Miller is one of those once-in-a-lifetime writer/performers.”

After releasing the album, Miller was accepted into Harvard College, and in 2009 he was honored with an Artist Development Fellowship awarded by the Office of the Arts. With equipment he acquired through this Fellowship, Miller explored new avenues for music production and also began creating customized monaural and binaural beats.

Miller worked to popularize blues, ragtime, and bluegrass at Harvard, spreading awareness through festivals like Arts First and Cultural Rhythms while also being selected to speak and perform at the Harvard Bluegrass Symposium. Scott Lozier, at the Harvard Arts Blog, wrote "I think they should start casting the Grammy statues for Clint. What a musician."

== Poetry and Philosophy ==
Miller's first publication was a book of philosophy in verse, The Book of Change, which was released by Cambridge Scholars Publishing in the United Kingdom in 2007.

== Drama ==
Miller's first play, Fate as It Relates to Cats and God, was staged at the famous Barter Theatre during the Young Playwrights Festival in 2002. Miller's next play, Our Diamond, went on to be performed all across America. It was published by Baker's Plays in 2009 and is now published by Samuel French. His most recent play, An Experiment, was staged at the Harvard Playwrights Festival in 2011. Miller's plays introduce new techniques for breaking the fourth wall to engage audiences unprecedented ways.

== Research ==
Miller was invited to Zhengzhou University in 2012 by Dr. Li Ying, and he began to design and conduct original experiments in the Psychology Department. He and his new team of post grad assistants explored collective intelligence and group wisdom. A portion of the experiments used monaural and binaural beats to manipulate the perception of time for targeted groups of people, leading Miller to joke that he "invented time travel in China."
