= Briskin =

Briskin is a surname. Notable people with the surname include:

- Alan Briskin, American sociologist
- Bernard Briskin (1924–2020), American businessman, son of Samuel
- Irving Briskin (1903–1981), American film producer
- Jacqueline Briskin (1927–2014), British-born American writer
- Samuel J. Briskin (1896–1968), American film producer
