= Psychological solipsism =

Psychological state and condition

Psychological solipsism or solipsism syndrome is a psychological state in which a person feels detached from external reality and perceives the world as existing only within their own mind. Extended periods of social isolation and confinement may contribute to the development of this condition. In particular, the syndrome has been identified as a potential concern for individuals living in space for extended periods of time.

== Overview ==
The philosophical definition of solipsism is the idea that only one's mind is sure to exist. In a solipsistic position, a person only believes their mind or self is sure to exist. This is part of self-existence theory or the view of the self.

Individuals experiencing solipsism syndrome feel reality is not 'real' in the sense of being external to their own minds. The syndrome is characterized by feelings of loneliness, detachment and indifference to the outside world. Solipsism syndrome is not currently recognized as a psychiatric disorder by the American Psychiatric Association, though it shares similarities with depersonalization-derealization disorder, which is recognized. Solipsism syndrome is distinct from solipsism, which is a philosophical position that nothing exists or can be known to exist outside of one's own mind rather than a psychological state. Advocates of this philosophy do not necessarily suffer from solipsism syndrome, and sufferers do not necessarily subscribe to solipsism as a school of intellectual thought.

Periods of extended isolation may predispose people to solipsism syndrome. In particular, the syndrome has been identified as a potential challenge for astronauts and cosmonauts on long-term missions, and these concerns influence the design of artificial habitats.

== See also ==
- Attribution (psychology) – Process by which individuals explain causes of behavior and events
- Depersonalization – Anomaly of self-awareness
- Depersonalization-derealization disorder – Mental dissociative disorder
- Derealization – Perception that the external world is not real
- Existential crisis – Inner conflict due to perceived meaninglessness
- Self-disorder – Mental state of a reduced perception of self-awareness
- Solipsism – Philosophical idea that only one's own mind is sure to exist
