= Collective wisdom =

Concept of shared knowledge

Collective wisdom, also called group wisdom and co-intelligence, is shared knowledge arrived at by individuals and groups with collaboration.

Collective intelligence, which is sometimes used synonymously with collective wisdom, is more of a shared decision process than collective wisdom. Unlike collective wisdom, collective intelligence is not uniquely human and has been associated with animal and plant life. Collective intelligence is basically consensus-driven decision-making, whereas collective wisdom is not necessarily focused on the decision process. Collective wisdom is a more amorphous phenomenon which can be characterized by collective learning over time.

== History ==
Collective wisdom, which may be said to have a more distinctly human quality than collective intelligence, is contained in such early works as The Torah, The Bible, The Koran, the works of Plato, Confucius and Buddha, the Bhagavad Gita, and the many myths and legends from all cultures. Drawing from the idea of universal truth, the point of collective wisdom is to make life easier/more enjoyable through understanding human behavior, whereas the point of collective intelligence is to make life easier/more enjoyable through the application of acquired knowledge. While collective intelligence may be said to have more mathematical and scientific bases, collective wisdom also accounts for the spiritual realm of human behaviors and consciousness. Thomas Jefferson referred to the concept of collective wisdom when he made his statement, "A Nation's best defense is an educated citizenry". Ιn effect, the ideal of a democracy is that government functions best when everyone participates. British philosopher Thomas Hobbes uses his Leviathan to illustrate how mankind's collective consciousness grows to create collective wisdom. Émile Durkheim argues in The Elementary Forms of Religious Life (1912) that society by definition constitutes a higher intelligence because it transcends the individual over space and time, thereby achieving collective wisdom. 19th-century Prussian physicist Gustav Fechner argued for a collective consciousness of mankind, and cited Durkheim as the most credible scholar in the field of "collective consciousness". Fechner also referred to the work of Jesuit Priest Pierre Teilhard de Chardin, whose concept of the noosphere was a precursor to the term collective intelligence. H.G. Wells's concept of "world brain", as described in his book of essays with the same title, has more recently been examined in depth by Pierre Lévy in his book, The Universe-Machine: Creation, Cognition and Computer Culture. Howard Bloom's treatise "The Global Brain: The Evolution of Mass Mind from the Big Bang to the 21st Century" examines similarities in organizational patterns in nature, human brain function, society, and the cosmos. He also posits the theory that group selection directs evolutionary change through collective information processing. Alexander Flor related the world brain concept with current developments in global knowledge networking spawned by new information and communication technologies in an online paper, A Global Knowledge Network. He also discussed the collective mind within the context of social movements in Asia in a book Development Communication Praxis.

== Contemporary definition and research ==
=== Collective Wisdom Initiative ===
The Collective Wisdom Initiative was formed in 2000 with the support of the Fetzer Institute for the purpose of gathering material on the research, theory, and practice of collective wisdom. It was a collaboration of practitioners and academics in areas such as business, health care, mental health, education, criminal justice, and conflict resolution. Several of the founding members subsequently co-authored The Power of Collective Wisdom. In this, six stances or principles, which support the power of collective wisdom are presented: deep listening, suspension of certainty, seeing whole systems/seeking diverse perspectives, respect for other/group discernment, welcoming all that is arising, and trust in the transcendent.

Two strands of thought relating to collective wisdom follow very different paths. The first suggests that aggregates of people and information will succeed in advancing wisdom, that wisdom is built on the accumulation of data and knowledge, without a need for judgement or qualification. Some have faulted this belief for failing to take into account the importance of 'adaptive assessment'. The second argues that wisdom is only possible in reflective states of mind, including metacognition. According to Alan Briskin, wisdom requires systematic reflection on the inner self and the outer states of social order. Mark Baurelein has made the case that the hypercommunication of knowledge has hobbled rather than promoted intellectual development.

== See also ==
- Co-intelligence
- Crowd psychology
- Delphi method
- Erroneous priorities effect
- Group intelligence
- Groupthink
- Herd instinct
- Herd mentality
- Information cascade
- Predictive market
- Spreadthink
- The Wisdom of Crowds
- Wisdom of the crowd
- The Wikiversity course on Pursuing Collective Wisdom

== References and further reading ==
- Atlee, Tom, The Tao of Democracy: Using Co-Intelligence to Create a World That Works for All. (2004) The Writers’ Collective, Cranston, Rhode Island.
- Bloom, Howard, The Global Brain: The Evolution of Mass Mind from the Big Bang to the 21st Century. (2000) John Wiley & Sons, New York.
- Flor, Alexander G. Chapter 10. Communication, Culture and the Collective Psyche. Development Communication Praxis. (2007) University of the Philippines – Open University Press. Diliman, Philippines.
- Johnson, Steven, Emergence: The Connected Lives of Ants, Brains, Cities and Software. (2001) Scribner, New York.
- Lee, Gerald Stanley, Crowds. A Moving-picture of Democracy. Doubleday, Page & Company. (1913) Project Gutenberg.
- Le Bon, Gustave, The Crowd: A Study of the Popular Mind. (1895) Project Gutenberg.
- Rogers, E. M., Diffusion of Innovations (5th Ed.). (2003) Free Press, New York.
- Suroweicki, James, The Wisdom of Crowds: Why the Many Are Smarter Than the Few and How Collective Wisdom Shapes Business, Economies, Societies and Nations: Boston: Little, Brown, Boston.
- Sunstein, Cass R., Infotopia: How Many Minds Produce Knowledge. (2006) Oxford University Press, Oxford, United Kingdom
