= Jan Haaken =

American psychologist, professor, and documentarian

Janice Kay Haaken
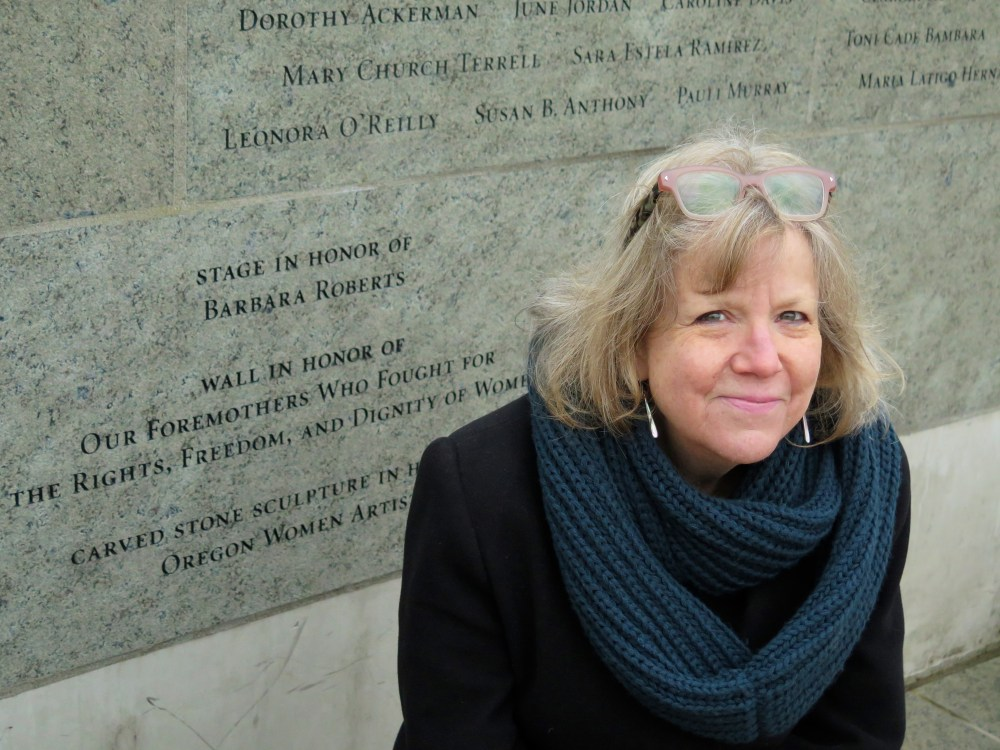
- Haaken before the Portland Walk of the Heroines wall.
- Born: March 2, 1947 (age 79)
- Occupations: Professor, psychologist, documentarian
- Title: Professor emeritus

Academic background
- Education: Wright Institute (PhD, 1979)

Academic work
- Discipline: Psychology
- Sub-discipline: Psychoanalysis, feminism, social psychology, clinical psychology, community psychology
- Institutions: Portland State University
- Website: https://jhaaken.com

Janice Kay "Jan" Haaken (born March 2, 1947) is an American clinical psychologist, documentarian, and professor emeritus of Community and Clinical Psychology in the Department of Psychology at Portland State University.

Haaken is the author of three books and co-editor of a collection of essays, many of which focus on trauma, memory, and the role of storytelling in social movements. She has directed six feature-length documentaries and a series of short films. Her work as a filmmaker tends to focus on the work of people on the "social margins" and those who perform typically misunderstood and stressful jobs.

== Education ==
Haaken began her career studying nursing at Everett Community College, where she finished with an associate degree in 1969. Haaken first worked as a psychiatric nurse in a children's clinic at the University of Washington Medical Center between 1969 and 1973 before re-enrolling at the University of Washington to continue her studies, graduating with a degree in psychology in 1974. Haaken continued her studies at the Wright Institute in Los Angeles, graduating with a PhD in 1979.

== Thought ==
Informed by both psychoanalysis and feminism, as well as her involvement in social movements, Haaken's scholarship has focused on range of topics including the symbolic and political significance of recovered memories of childhood sexual abuse, storytelling and domestic violence, to psychological trauma. She has written three books and has published an edited a collection of essays on childhood sexual abuse with Paula Reavey called Memory Matters: Contexts for Understanding Sexual Abuse Recollections. Haaken's interest lies in cultural and clinical views of human suffering and problematic aspects of trauma theory in the mental health field, as well as where the American criminal justice system intersects with psychological health.

Haaken's first book, Pillar of Salt: Gender, Memory, and the Perils of Looking Back, was published by Rutgers University Press in June 2000. In Pillar of Salt, Haaken explores controversy over recollections of childhood sexual abuse as part of a larger questioning of the nature of memory, storytelling, and the psychology of women. The book followed debates about multiple personality disorder, Satanic ritual abuse, and pedophilia which dominated mental health work in the nineties. Rather than debunk or promote these ideas, Haaken sought to answer why those ideas resonate in dominant discourse within the field of psychology and the feminist movement, as well as to explore the nuances and complexity of those ideas.

Haaken's follow-up to Pillar of Salt, Hard Knocks: Domestic Violence and the Psychology of Storytelling, released in 2010, further analyzes the nature of memory and the role storytelling in the battered women's movement while also exploring themes such as female aggression and gender roles as they relate to domestic violence. In her research for the book, Haaken drew on eight years of interviews, some with women who worked in women's shelters and figures in the battered women's movement, as well as literature, novels, and films produced by feminist writers.

Haaken's third book, Psychiatry, Politics, and PTSD: Breaking Down, was released in 2020. Haaken wrote the book to offer a new perspective on post traumatic stress disorder (PTSD) as a clinical and social phenomenon, topics she has explored in earlier work, including the film Mind Zone. Psychiatry, Politics, and PTSD explores how PTSD diagnosis has depended on the historical social stigma surrounding mental and personality disorders. Haaken appeared on Mad in America in February 2021 to discuss the release of the book.

== Community involvement ==
=== Radio ===
Haaken is a member of the Old Mole Variety Hour, a weekly public affairs program airing on Portland's KBOO FM radio station each Monday at the 9 o’clock hour. Haaken hosts a monthly "Left and the Law" segment and frequently contributes interviews and other commentary segments. Haaken has also been interviewed on the show for her own work, including for her film Our Bodies Our Doctors and book Psychiatry, Politics and PTSD: Breaking Down.

=== Activism ===
In 1993, Haaken collaborated with fellow scholar and activist Johanna Brenner in establishing In Other Words, a feminist community center and bookstore in Portland, OR's Killingsworth neighborhood.

Haaken played a major role in the creation of Portland State University's Walk of the Heroines, serving on the board of directors and executive committee, among holding other positions. The project was completed in June 2011 and pays tribute to women's contributions to and accomplishments within society and culture. Haaken herself is honored on the walk.

== Filmmaking ==
Haaken's work as a documentary filmmaker focuses on people who perform stressful jobs, as well as marginalized members of American society. She practices participatory action research and is influenced by psychoanalysis, feminist theory, and critical psychology in her filmmaking. Haaken has directed six feature documentaries and a number of short films since 2005, as well as worked as a writer and producer.

=== 2006–2010: Early Film Work ===
In 2006, Haaken directed Diamonds, Guns, and Rice, an examination of the Sierra Leone Civil War, with her son, Caleb Heymann. She revisited Sierra Leone in the 2008 documentary film Moving to the Beat, co-directed by Abdul Fofanah and Heymann and produced by Haaken. Moving to the Beat follows an American hip-hop group journeying to Freetown, Sierra Leone and explores the relationship between Black Americans and Africans and the roots of the hip-hop genre.

Queens of Heart: Community Therapists in Drag, released in 2006, follows the story of Darcelle XV, the longest-surviving drag club in the United States. The film began as a psychological study of drag performance by Haaken and several Portland State University graduate students and was later developed into a full-length documentary. The film incorporates elements of psychology into its story and aimed to challenge public opinion of the psychology of drag performance.

Guilty Except for Insanity: Maddening Journeys Through an Asylum, released in 2010, explores the interconnection between the American criminal justice and mental healthcare systems by following the lives of employees as well as patients at the Oregon State Hospital who were admitted on the basis of a plea of criminal insanity.

=== 2011–2018: Mind Zone and Milk Men ===
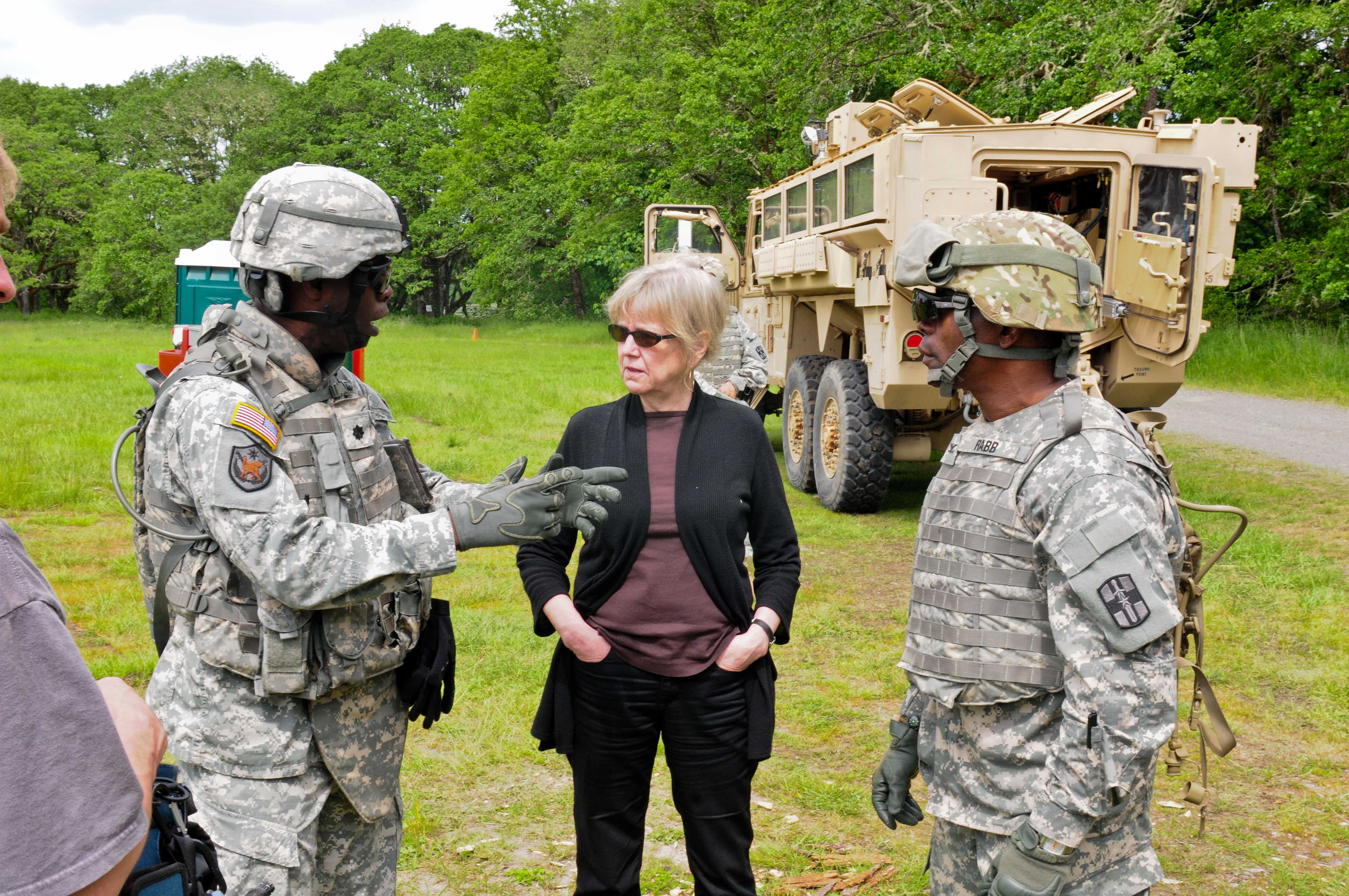
Haaken on the set of Mind Zone: Therapists Behind the Front Lines.

2014's Mind Zone: Therapists Behind the Front Lines follows a group of therapists carrying out two conflicting missions with the 113th Army Combat Stress Control detachment. Work on Mind Zone began in 2010 when Haaken proposed a documentary on mental health practices within the American military to the U.S. Army. Haaken states she was moved to produce the film by the military's increased reliance on psychologists to not only treat but prevent the negative psychiatric effects of warfare, in part due to growing rates of post-traumatic stress disorder and suicide among veterans.

Milk Men, released in 2015, aimed to correct both the "highly romanticized and demonized portraits of dairy farmers" which are often seen in mainstream media. The film aimed to present an educational approach to the dialogue surrounding animal agriculture and animal rights, as well as to bring together the stories of farmers with "social questions at the heart of modern life."

=== 2019: Our Bodies Our Doctors ===
On International Women's Day on March 8, 2019, Our Bodies Our Doctors premiered at the 42nd Portland International Film Festival, where it went on to win Best Documentary Feature. Only a handful of the "maybe 40 or 50" providers Haaken approached prior to filming agreed to be featured in the film; Haaken has stated she feels this is reflective of ongoing stigma and potential of violence surrounding abortion care. About ten patients receiving abortions agreed to have their procedures filmed, though their identities were kept anonymous. Haaken has been an active part in the feminist and reproductive rights movements since before the 1980s and was inspired to make Our Bodies Our Doctors by witnessing ongoing violence and harassment targeted at abortion providers. Haaken states her hope that Our Bodies Our Doctors would bring the topic of abortion into everyday conversation and destigmatize abortion for both women seeking care and medical staff who provide that care. Our Bodies Our Doctors has been endorsed by reproductive rights activists, including Gloria Steinem, congresswoman Pramila Jayapal, former Planned Parenthood CEO Cecile Richards.

=== 2020-Present: Necessity Series ===
In 2019, Haaken and co-director Samantha Praus, who worked with Haaken on Our Bodies Our Doctors, began working on Necessity: Oil, Water and Climate Resistance in response to Indigenous-led activism against pipeline expansion in Minnesota. Necessity follows two stories of climate activists engaging in civil disobedience and using the necessity defense in court in effort to stop the expansion of pipelines carrying tar sands oil through Native land in Minnesota. Necessity began its festival run in 2020 and was made available for educational purposes by the Zinn Education Project in 2020 and released by Collective Eye in early 2021. The film was awarded the "Spirit of Activism" prize at the February 2021 Colorado Environmental Film Festival, and showed at a number of other events, including the Italian Life After Oil, the Eugene Environmental Film Festival, AmDocs, and SunCommon's Climate Action Film Festival.

In October 2020, Haaken's team announced via social media that a sequel with the working title Necessity: Part II, following the continued fight against fossil fuels in the Pacific Northwest, was in the works. Necessity Part II: Rails, Rivers, and the Thin Green Line began limited virtual showings in December 2021, with a planned premiere at the Kiggins Theatre in Vancouver, Washington on January 9, 2022, though that screening was later rescheduled due to concerns over the COVID-19 pandemic. The film ultimately premiered on March 20, 2022, with the title Necessity: Climate Justice and the Thin Green Line. The story narration of both Necessity and Necessity Part II is led by activist and tribal attorney Tara Houska of the Couchiching First Nation and Part II is supported by activists from the Sunrise Movement, the town of Mosier, Oregon, Cager Clabaugh of the International Longshore and Warehouse Union Local 4, students and teachers from the Portland metropolitan area, and others. Cathy Sampson-Kruse, elder and member of the Waluulapum band of the Confederated Tribes of the Umatilla Indian Reservation, is also featured heavily in the film.

=== 2024–Present: The Palestine Exception ===
In 2024, Haaken co-directed The Palestine Exception with Jennifer Ruth. The documentary examines what has been described as a "new McCarthyism" on U.S. college campuses following the October 7, 2023 attacks and the subsequent war on Gaza. The film focuses on the "Palestine exception" to academic freedom, documenting the experiences of students and faculty facing censorship and disciplinary action for pro-Palestinian activism. It premiered at the 2025 Chicago Palestine Film Festival and won Best Documentary Feature at the 2025 Morehouse College Human Rights Film Festival.

== Bibliography ==
=== Books ===
- Haaken, Jan (2020). Psychiatry, Politics, and PTSD: Breaking Down. Routledge University Press. ISBN 9780367819378.
- Haaken, Jan (2010). Hard Knocks: Domestic Violence and the Psychology of Storytelling. Women and Psychology. London: Routledge. ISBN 978-0415563420.
- Haaken, Jan (1998). Pillar of Salt: Gender, Memory, and the Perils of Looking Back. New Brunswick: Rutgers University Press. ISBN 0813528372.

=== Edited volumes ===
- Haaken, Jan; Reavey, Paula, eds. (2009). Memory Matters: Contexts for Understanding Sexual Abuse Recollections. London: Routledge. ISBN 978-0415444910.
- Haaken, Jan; Ladum, Ariel; Zundel, Kayt; Heymann, Caleb, eds. (2005). "Speaking Out: Women, War and the Global Economy". Speaking Out: Women, War, and the Global Economy. Portland: Ooligan. ISBN 1932010726. Archived from the original on July 30, 2016.

== Filmography ==
=== Director ===
- Haaken, Jan (2022). NECESSITY Part II: Rails, Rivers, and the Thin Green Line (Motion Picture). Portland: J Haaken Productions.
- Haaken, Jan (2021). NECESSITY: Oil, Water, and Climate Resistance (Motion Picture). Portland: J Haaken Productions.
- Haaken, Jan (2019). Our Bodies Our Doctors (Motion Picture). Los Angeles: Specular Productions.
- Haaken, Jan (2015). Milk Men: The Life and Times of Dairy Farmers (Motion Picture). Portland: Lower Forty Films. OCLC 944251800.
- Haaken, Jan (2014). Mind Zone: Therapists Behind the Front Line (Motion Picture). Los Angeles: Herzog & Company. OCLC 903533175.
- Haaken, Jan (2011). Guilty Except for Insanity: Maddening Journeys Through an Asylum (Motion Picture). Portland: Portland State University. OCLC 779849612.
- Haaken, Jan (2006). Queens of Heart (Motion Picture). Los Angeles: Cinema Libre. OCLC 810252586. Archived from the original on October 11, 2016.

=== Producer ===
- Heymann, Caleb (Director); Fofanah, Abdul (Director); Haaken, Jan (Producer) (2011). Moving to the Beat (Motion Picture). New York: National Black Programming Consortium. OCLC 767650251.

=== Sources ===
- Haaken, Jan (1998). Pillar of Salt: Gender, Memory, and the Perils of Looking Back. New Brunswick: Rutgers University Press. ISBN 0813528372.
- Raine, Pamela (2000). "Book Review: Pillar of Salt: Gender, Memory, and the Perils of Looking Back". Feminist Theory. 1 (3). Sage: 378–379. doi:10.1177/146470010000100311. S2CID 143819630.
