= Don W. Kreger =

American clinical psychologist and author

Don W. Kreger (D. W. Kreger) is an American author and clinical psychologist. He is known for his 1995 peer-reviewed article on self-esteem, stress, and depression among graduate students, which has been cited in more than one hundred scholarly publications. His 2019 book Lewd: The Secret History of English Dirty Words was named a finalist for the Eric Hoffer Book Award in Non-Fiction. His works on Taoist philosophy have also received independent reviews.

== Career ==
Kreger received his Ph.D. in clinical psychology from the Wright Institute, Berkeley, CA. He has worked in behavioral medicine and outpatient mental-health settings in California. He practices as a clinical psychologist with the Loma Linda Psychiatric Medical Group. His research on stress, self-esteem, and mental health among graduate students has been cited in academic literature.

== Selected works ==
=== Books ===
- The Secret Tao (2011)
- The Tao of Yoda (2013)
- Lewd: The Secret History of English Dirty Words (2019)
- The Wheel of Time: Origin of the Holy Days (2020)

=== Journal articles ===
- Kreger, D. W. (1995). "Self-Esteem, Stress, and Depression Among Graduate Students." Psychological Reports.
