= Depersonalization-derealization disorder =

Mental dissociative disorder

- Other names: Depersonalization disorder, derealization disorder
- Specialty: Psychiatry, clinical psychology
- Symptoms: Feeling detached from oneself (depersonalization), feeling detached from one's surroundings (derealization)
- Usual onset: Adolescence
- Duration: Episodic, chronic
- Risk factors: Childhood trauma, substance abuse
- Treatment: Psychotherapy
- Prognosis: Usually positive
- Frequency: 1–2% (general population)

Depersonalization-derealization disorder (DPDR) is a dissociative disorder in which the person experiences or has persistent or recurrent feelings of depersonalization or derealization. Depersonalization is a feeling of being disconnected or detached from oneself. Individuals may report feeling as if they are an outside observer of their own thoughts or body, and often report feeling a loss of control over their thoughts or actions. Derealization is described as detachment from one's surroundings. Individuals experiencing derealization may report perceiving the world around them as foggy, dreamlike, surreal, detached or visually distorted.

Depersonalization-derealization disorder is thought to be caused largely by interpersonal trauma such as early childhood abuse or intense amounts of trauma experienced within a short period of time. Adverse childhood experiences, specifically emotional abuse and neglect, have been linked to the development of depersonalization symptoms. Feelings of depersonalization and derealization are common from significant stress, anxiety, or panic attacks. Individuals may remain in a depersonalized state for the duration of a typical panic or stress attack. However, in some cases, the dissociative state may last for hours, days, weeks, or even months. In rare cases, symptoms of a single episode can last for years. Cases like these are caused by severe amounts of abuse, trauma and stress.

Diagnostic criteria include persistent or recurrent feelings of detachment from one's mental or bodily processes or from one's surroundings. A diagnosis is made when the dissociation is persistent, interferes with the social or occupational functions of daily life, or causes marked distress in the patient. While brief episodes of depersonalization or derealization are common in the general population, the disorder is only diagnosed when these symptoms cause substantial distress or impair functioning.

While once considered rare, about 1–2% of the general population are affected at some point. The long-term form of the disorder affects about 0.8 to 1.9%.

== Signs and symptoms ==
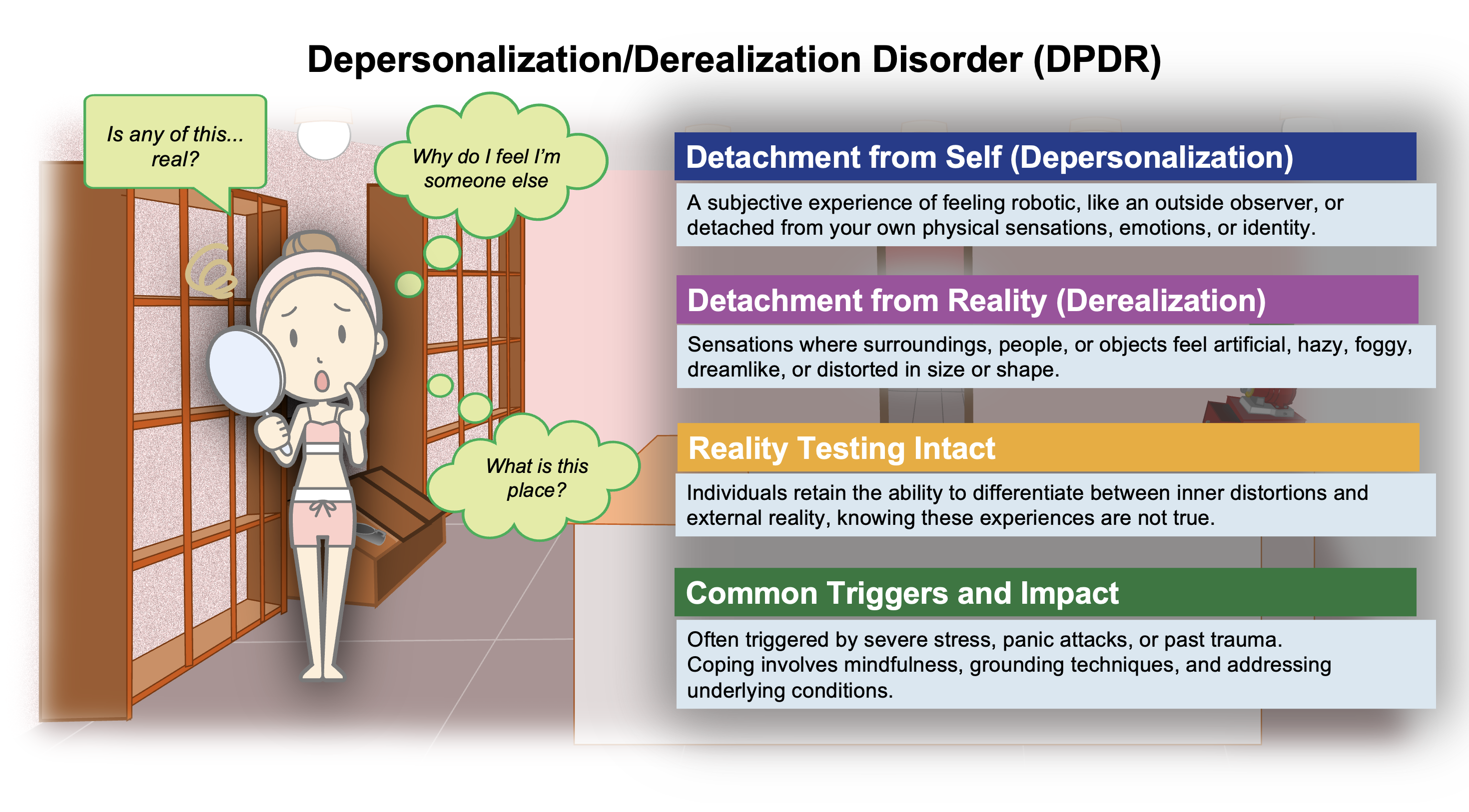
Features of DPDR

The core symptoms of depersonalization-derealization disorder are the subjective experience of "unreality in one's self", or detachment from one's surroundings. Individuals who are diagnosed with depersonalization also often experience an urge to question and think critically about the nature of reality and existence often leading to extended periods of contemplation.

Individuals with depersonalization describe feeling disconnected from their physicality; feeling as if they are not completely occupying their own body; feeling as if their speech or physical movements are out of their control; feeling detached from their own thoughts or emotions; and experiencing themselves and their lives from a distance. While depersonalization involves detachment from one's self, individuals with derealization feel detached from their surroundings, as if the world around them is foggy, dreamlike, or visually distorted. Individuals with the disorder commonly describe a feeling that time is passing them by and that they are not in the present. In some cases, individuals may be unable to accept their reflection as their own, or they may have out-of-body experiences. Additionally some individuals experience difficulty concentrating and problems with memory retrieval. These individuals sometimes lack the "feeling" of a memory, recalling it but feeling as if they did not personally experience it. These experiences which strike at the core of a person's identity and consciousness may cause a person to feel uneasy or anxious. The inner turmoil created by the disorder can also result in depression.

First experiences with depersonalization may be frightening, with patients fearing loss of control, dissociation from the rest of society, and functional impairment. The majority of people with depersonalization-derealization disorder misinterpret the symptoms, thinking that they are signs of serious psychosis or brain dysfunction. This commonly leads to an increase in anxiety and obsession, which contributes to the worsening of symptoms.

Factors that tend to diminish symptoms are comforting personal interactions, intense physical or emotional stimulation, and relaxation. Distracting oneself (by engaging in conversation or watching a movie, for example) may also provide temporary relief. Some other factors that are identified as relieving symptom severity are diet or exercise, while alcohol and fatigue are listed by some as worsening their symptoms.

Many members of the general population can experience occasional, brief moments of mild depersonalization; however, depersonalization-derealization disorder occurs when these feelings are strong, severe, persistent, or recurrent and when these feelings interfere with daily functioning. DPDR is most commonly experienced as chronic and continuous. However, for a minority who have DPDR as an episodic condition, the duration of these episodes is highly variable, with some lasting as long as, or longer than, several weeks.

== Causes ==
The exact cause of depersonalization is unknown, although biopsychosocial correlations and triggers have been identified. It has been thought that depersonalization can result from a biological response to dangerous or life-threatening situations, leading to heightened senses and emotional numbing. Trauma such as witnessing or experiencing domestic violence, accidents or natural disasters, sudden death of a loved one, or having a parent with severe mental illness can cause DPDR.

Recreational substance use, particularly cannabis, ketamine, and other hallucinogens, has also been identified as a trigger for episodes of depersonalization and derealization, precipitating a form of the disorder called hallucinogen persisting perception disorder.

=== Psychosocial ===
There is growing evidence linking physical and sexual abuse in childhood with the development of dissociative disorders. Childhood interpersonal trauma – emotional abuse in particular – is a significant predictor of a diagnosis of DPDR. Compared to other types of childhood trauma, emotional abuse has been found to be the most significant predictor both of a diagnosis of depersonalization-derealization disorder and of depersonalization scores, but not of general dissociation scores. Some studies suggest that greater emotional abuse and lower physical abuse predict depersonalization in adult women with post-traumatic stress disorder (PTSD). Patients with high interpersonal abuse histories (HIA) show significantly higher scores on the Cambridge Depersonalization Scale, when compared to a control group. Earlier age of abuse, increased duration and parental abuse tend to correlate with severity of dissociative symptoms. Besides traumatic experiences, other common precipitators of the disorder include severe stress, major depressive disorder or panic attacks. People who live in highly individualistic cultures may be more vulnerable to depersonalization due to a hypersensitivity towards threats and fears of losing control.

A 2010 study found evidence that some users participating in virtual reality (VR) may be more likely to experience dissociation after use. Users reportedly experienced higher levels of a lessened sense of presence in reality after exposure to VR. However, it was noted that the effects of exposure were likely to rapidly disappear after returning to objective reality. Additionally, individuals who reported higher preexisting dissociation levels, as well as being more easily immersed or absorbed in imagination overall, were found to be linked to higher increases in dissociative symptoms after the VR exposure. This study offered evidence towards a link between imaginative processes of the brain and dissociative experiences.

=== Neurobiology ===
Animated image showing prefrontal cortex, which is thought to play a role in DPDR

There is converging evidence that the prefrontal cortex may inhibit neural circuits that normally form the basis of emotional experience. In an fMRI study of DPDR patients, emotionally aversive scenes activated the right ventral prefrontal cortex. Participants demonstrated a reduced neural response in emotion-sensitive regions, as well as an increased response in regions associated with emotional regulation. In a similar test of emotional memory, depersonalization-derealization disorder patients did not process emotionally salient material in the same way as did healthy controls. In a test of skin conductance responses to unpleasant stimuli, the subjects showed a selective inhibitory mechanism on emotional processing.

Studies are beginning to show that the temporoparietal junction has a role in multisensory integration, embodiment, and self-other distinction. Several studies analyzing brain MRI findings from DPDR patients found decreased cortical thickness in the right middle temporal gyrus, reduction in grey matter volume in the right caudate, thalamus, and occipital gyri, as well as lower white matter integrity in the left temporal and right temporoparietal regions. However, no structural changes in the amygdala were observed.

A PET scan found functional abnormalities in the visual, auditory, and somatosensory cortex, as well as in areas responsible for an integrated body schema.

One study examining EEG readings found frontal alpha-wave overactivation and increased theta activity waves in the temporal region of the left hemisphere.

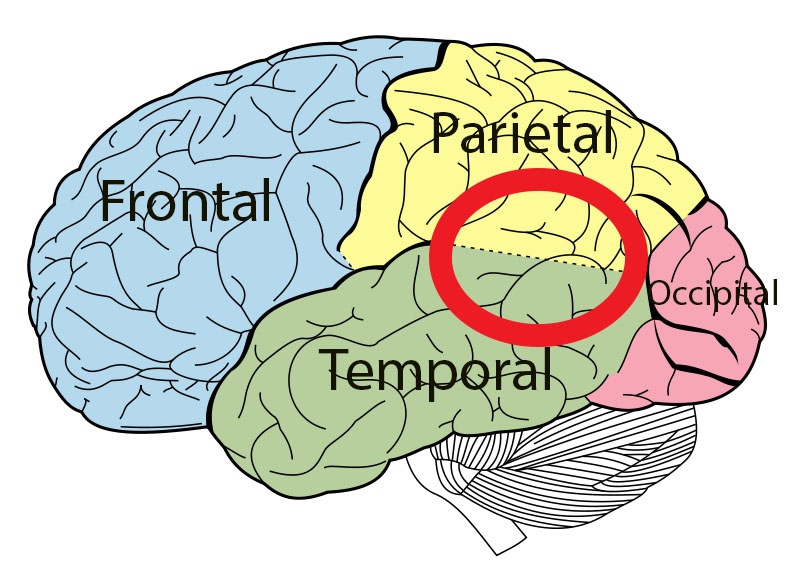
Image showing temporoparietal junction, a portion of the brain also thought to play a role in DPDR

It is unclear whether genetics plays a role; however, there are many neurochemical and hormonal changes in individuals with depersonalization-derealization disorder. DPDR may be associated with dysregulation of the hypothalamic-pituitary-adrenal axis, the area of the brain involved in the "fight-or-flight" response. Patients demonstrate abnormal cortisol levels and basal activity. Studies found that patients with DPDR could be distinguished from patients with clinical depression and posttraumatic stress disorder.

The vestibular system may also play a role in DPDR. The vestibular system helps control balance, spatial orientation, and motor coordination, but also plays a role in self-awareness. Disruption to this system can potentially cause a feeling of detachment from surroundings. Several studies have shown that patients with peripheral vestibular disease are also more likely to have dissociative symptoms when compared to healthy individuals.

Dissociative symptoms are sometimes described by those with neurological diseases, such as amyotrophic lateral sclerosis, Alzheimer's, multiple sclerosis (MS), etc., that directly affect brain tissue.

== Diagnosis ==
=== Assessment ===
Diagnosis is based on the self-reported experiences of the person followed by a clinical assessment. Psychiatric assessment includes a psychiatric history and some form of mental status examination. Since some medical and psychiatric conditions mimic the symptoms of DPDR, clinicians must differentiate between and rule out the following to establish a precise diagnosis: temporal lobe epilepsy, panic disorder, acute stress disorder, schizophrenia, migraine, drug use, brain tumor or lesion. No laboratory test for depersonalization-derealization disorder currently exists. As patients with dissociative disorders likely experienced intense trauma in the past, concomitant dissociative disorders should be considered in patients diagnosed with a stress disorder (i.e. PTSD or acute stress disorder).

The diagnosis of depersonalization-derealization disorder can be made with the use of the following interviews and scales:

- The Structured Clinical Interview for DSM-IV Dissociative Disorders (SCID-D) is widely used, especially in research settings. This interview takes about 30 minutes to 1.5 hours, depending on the individual's experiences.
- The Dissociative Experiences Scale (DES) is a simple, quick, self-administered questionnaire that has been widely used to measure dissociative symptoms. It has been used in hundreds of dissociative studies and can detect depersonalization and derealization experiences.
- The Dissociative Disorders Interview Schedule (DDIS) is a highly structured interview which makes DSM-IV diagnoses of somatization disorder, borderline personality disorder and major depressive disorder, as well as all the dissociative disorders. It inquires about positive symptoms of schizophrenia, secondary features of dissociative identity disorder, extrasensory experiences, substance abuse and other items relevant to the dissociative disorders. The DDIS can usually be administered in 30–45 minutes.
- The Cambridge Depersonalization Scale (CDS) is a method for determining the severity of depersonalization disorder. It has been proven and accepted as a valid tool for the diagnosis of depersonalization-derealization disorder in a clinical setting. It is also used in a clinical setting to differentiate minor episodes of depersonalization from actual symptoms of the disorder. Due to the success of the CDS, a group of Japanese researchers undertook the effort to translate the CDS into the J-CDS or the Japanese Cambridge Depersonalization Scale. Through clinical trials, the Japanese research team successfully tested their scale and determined its accuracy. One limitation is that the scale does not allow for the differentiation between past and present episodes of depersonalization. It may be difficult for the individual to describe the duration of a depersonalization episode, and thus the scale may lack accuracy. The project was conducted in the hope that it would stimulate further scientific investigations into depersonalization-derealization disorder.

=== DSM-5 ===
In the Diagnostic and Statistical Manual of Mental Disorders, 5th Edition DSM-5, the word "derealization" was added to "depersonalization disorder" and renamed "depersonalization-derealization disorder" ("DPDR"). It remains classified as a dissociative disorder.

Patients must meet the following criteria to be diagnosed per the DSM-5:

1. Presence of persistent/recurrent episodes of depersonalization/derealization
2. Ability to distinguish between reality and dissociation during an episode (i.e. patient is aware of a perceptual disturbance)
3. Symptoms are severe enough to interfere with social, occupational, or other areas of functioning
4. Symptoms are not due to a substance or medication
5. Symptoms are not due to another psychiatric disorder

=== ICD-11 ===
The International Classification of Diseases 11th Revision ICD-11 has relisted DPDR as a disorder rather than a syndrome as previously, and has also reclassified it as a dissociative disorder from its previous listing as a neurotic disorder. The description used in the ICD-11 is similar to the criteria found in the DSM-5. Individuals with DPDR are described as having persistent/recurrent symptoms of depersonalization/derealization, have intact reality testing, and symptoms are not better explained by another psychiatric/neural disorder, substance, medication, or head trauma. Symptoms are severe enough to cause distress or impairment in functioning.

=== Differential diagnoses ===
DPDR differentials include neurologic and psychiatric conditions as well as side effects from psychoactive substances or medications.

==== Neurologic ====
- Seizures
- Brain tumor
- Post-concussion syndrome
- Metabolic abnormalities
- Migraines
- Vertigo
- Meniere's disease
- Visual snow syndrome

==== Psychiatric ====
- Panic attack
- Phobias
- Post-traumatic stress disorder
- Acute stress disorder
- Depression
- Bipolar disorder
- Schizophrenia
- Borderline personality disorder
- Other dissociative disorders
  - Dissociative identity disorder

==== Psychoactive substances ====
- Cannabis
- Hallucinogens
- MDMA
- Ketamine
- Hallucinogen persisting perception disorder

== Prevention ==
Depersonalization-derealization disorder may be prevented by connecting children who have been abused with professional mental health help. Some trauma specialists strongly advocate for increasing inquiry into information about children's trauma history and exposure to violence, since the majority of people (about 80%) responsible for child maltreatment are the child's own caregivers. Trauma-specific intervention for children may be useful in preventing future symptoms.

== Treatment ==
Treatment of DPDR is often difficult, and the condition is often refractory. Some clinicians speculate that this could be due to a delay in diagnosis, by which point symptoms tend to be constant and less responsive to treatment. Additionally, symptoms tend to overlap with other diagnoses. Some results have been promising, but are hard to evaluate with confidence due to the small size of trials. However, recognizing and diagnosing the condition may in itself have therapeutic benefits, considering many patients express their problems as baffling and unique to them, but are not, in fact, and are recognized and described by psychiatry. However, symptoms are often transient and can remit on their own without treatment.

A 2023 systematic review noted that while historical clinical research has heavily evaluated pharmacological interventions, no single medication has been proven globally effective, and psychological therapies remain foundational. Self-hypnosis training can be helpful and entails training patients to induce dissociative symptoms and respond in an alternative manner. Psychoeducation involves counseling regarding the disorder, reassurance, and emphasis on DPDR as a perceptual disturbance rather than a true physical experience. Clinical pharmacotherapy research continues to explore a number of possible options, including selective serotonin reuptake inhibitors (SSRI), benzodiazepines, stimulants, and opioid antagonists (e.g., naltrexone).

=== Therapy ===
An open study of cognitive-behavioral therapy aimed to help patients reinterpret their symptoms in a nonthreatening way, leading to improvements on several standardized measures. A standardized treatment for DPDR based on cognitive behavioral principles was published in the Netherlands in 2011.

=== Medications ===
Tentative evidence supports the use of opioid antagonists (e.g., naloxone), benzodiazepines, or methylphenidate.

Evidence suggests the beneficial use of lamotrigine in addition to an SSRI but not as monotherapy. A combination of an SSRI and a benzodiazepine has been proposed to be useful for DPDR patients with anxiety.

Modafinil used alone has been reported to be effective in a subgroup of individuals with depersonalization-derealization disorder: those who have attentional impairments, under-arousal, and hypersomnia. However, clinical trials have not been conducted.

=== Repetitive transcranial magnetic stimulation ===
Some studies have found repetitive transcranial magnetic stimulation (rTMS) to be helpful. One study examined 12 patients with DPDR that were treated with right temporoparietal junction (TPJ) rTMS and found that 50% showed improvement after three weeks of treatment. Five of the participants received an additional 3 weeks of treatment and reported an overall 68% improvement in their symptoms. Treating patients with rTMS specifically at the TPJ may be an alternative treatment.

=== Grounding techniques ===
Some grounding methods help deal with the DPDR attacks through the use of all five senses to regain a sense of reality. These include holding cold items, the 5-4-3-2-1 sensory grounding technique, tactile stimulation, breathing exercises, and repetitive music. These techniques will not cure dissociative attacks, but they will reduce their frequency and severity.

== Prognosis ==
A case series on 223 people found that the condition tended to be long-lasting. However, while no medication is FDA-approved for the condition, psychotherapy is known to help. In some cases, recovery can take place spontaneously.

== Epidemiology ==
Men and women are diagnosed in equal numbers with depersonalization-derealization disorder. A 1991 study estimated the prevalence at 2.4%. A 2008 review of several studies estimated the prevalence between 0.8% and 1.9%. This disorder is episodic in only one-third of individuals, with each episode lasting from hours to months at a time. Depersonalization can begin episodically, and later become continuous at constant or varying intensity.

Onset is typically during adolescence, although some patients report being depersonalized as long as they can remember, and a small minority report a later onset (by age 40). According to the DSM-5-TR, less than 20% of patients with the disorder first experience symptoms after age 20 years; 80% or more have their onset in the first 2 decades of life - childhood and adolescence. The onset can be acute or insidious in nature. With acute onset, some individuals remember the exact time and place of their first experience of depersonalization or derealization. This may follow a prolonged period of severe stress, a traumatic event, or an episode of another mental illness. Insidious onset may reach back as far as can be remembered (early childhood), or it may begin with smaller episodes of lesser severity that become gradually more intense and more disabling. Some patients report persistent depersonalization or derealization throughout the day, nearly every day.

=== Relation to other psychiatric disorders ===
Depersonalization exists as both a primary and secondary phenomenon. The most common comorbid disorders are depression and anxiety, although cases of depersonalization-derealization disorder without symptoms of either do exist. Comorbid obsessive/compulsive behaviors may exist as attempts to deal with depersonalization, such as checking whether symptoms have changed and avoiding behavioral and cognitive factors that exacerbate symptoms. Many people with personality disorders such as schizoid personality disorder, schizotypal personality disorder, and borderline personality disorder will have experiences of depersonalization. Patients with complex dissociative disorders, including dissociative identity disorder, experience high levels of depersonalization and derealization.

== History ==
The word depersonalization itself was first used by Henri Frédéric Amiel in The Journal Intime. The 8 July 1880 entry reads:

I find myself regarding existence as though from beyond the tomb, from another world; all is strange to me; I am, as it were, outside my own body and individuality; I am depersonalized, detached, cut adrift. Is this madness?

Depersonalization was first used as a clinical term by Ludovic Dugas in 1898 to refer to "a state in which there is the feeling or sensation that thoughts and acts elude the self and become strange; there is an alienation of personality – in other words a depersonalization". This description refers to personalization as a psychical synthesis of attribution of states to the self.

Early theories of the cause of depersonalization focused on sensory impairment. Maurice Krishaber proposed depersonalization was the result of pathological changes to the body's sensory modalities which lead to experiences of "self-strangeness" and the description of one patient who "feels that he is no longer himself". One of Carl Wernicke's students suggested all sensations were composed of a sensory component and a related muscular sensation that came from the movement itself and served to guide the sensory apparatus to the stimulus. In depersonalized patients, these two components were not synchronized, and the myogenic sensation failed to reach consciousness. The sensory hypothesis was challenged by others who suggested that patient complaints were being taken too literally and that some descriptions were metaphors – attempts to describe experiences that are difficult to articulate in words. Pierre Janet approached the theory by pointing out that his patients with clear sensory pathology did not complain of symptoms of unreality, and that those who have depersonalization were normal from a sensory viewpoint.

Psychodynamic theory formed the basis for the conceptualization of dissociation as a defense mechanism. Within this framework, depersonalization is understood as a defense against a variety of negative feelings, conflicts, or experiences. Sigmund Freud himself experienced fleeting derealization when visiting the Acropolis in person; having read about it for years and knowing it existed, seeing the real thing was overwhelming and proved difficult for him to perceive it as real. Freudian theory is the basis for the description of depersonalization as a dissociative reaction, placed within the category of psychoneurotic disorders, in the first two editions of the Diagnostic and Statistical Manual of Mental Disorders.

It can be argued that because depersonalization and derealization are both impairments to one's ability to perceive reality, they are merely two facets of the same disorder. Depersonalization also differs from delusion in the sense that the patient can differentiate between reality and the symptoms they may experience. The ability to sense that something is unreal is maintained when experiencing symptoms of the disorder. The problem with properly defining depersonalization also lies within the understanding of what reality actually is. To comprehend the nature of reality we must incorporate all the subjective experiences throughout and thus the problem of obtaining an objective definition is brought about again.

== Society and culture ==
Depersonalization-derealization disorder has appeared in a variety of media. The director of the autobiographical documentary Tarnation, Jonathan Caouette, had depersonalization-derealization disorder. The screenwriter for the 2007 film Numb had depersonalization-derealization disorder, as does the film's protagonist played by Matthew Perry. Norwegian painter Edvard Munch's famous masterpiece The Scream may have been inspired by depersonalization-derealization disorder. In Glen Hirshberg's novel The Snowman's Children, main female plot characters throughout the book had a condition that is revealed to be depersonalization-derealization disorder. Suzanne Segal had an episode in her 20s that was diagnosed by several psychologists as depersonalization-derealization disorder, though Segal herself interpreted it through the lens of Buddhism as a spiritual experience, commonly known as "Satori" or "Samadhi". The song "Is Happiness Just a Word?" by hip hop artist Vinnie Paz describes his struggle with depersonalization-derealization disorder. Adam Duritz, of the band Counting Crows, has often spoken about his diagnosis of depersonalization-derealization disorder.

== See also ==
- Anosognosia – Unawareness of one's own illness, symptoms or impairments
- Cotard's syndrome – Delusion that one is dead or non-existent
- Self-disorder – Mental state of a reduced perception of self-awareness
- Solipsism syndrome – Psychological state and condition
