= Our Bodies Our Doctors =

Documentary on abortion

- Directed by: Jan Haaken
- Produced by: David Cress
- Cinematography: Caleb Heymann Eric Edwards Timothy Wildgoose
- Edited by: Ben Mercer
- Production company: Specular Productions
- Release date: 2019
- Country: United States
- Language: English

Our Bodies Our Doctors is a 2019 American documentary film directed by Portland-based clinical psychologist and documentary filmmaker Jan Haaken. It concerns the work of abortion providers in the United States and controversy and backlash often faced by those providers. The film features the work of providers local to the Pacific Northwest, including based in the Seattle metropolitan area and the Oregon Health & Science University, as well as in Kansas and Oklahoma at the South Wind Women's Center.

Our Bodies Our Doctors premiered at the 42nd Portland International Film Festival on International Women's Day, March 8, 2019, where it went on to win Best Documentary Feature.

== Synopsis ==
Our Bodies Our Doctors follows a cohort of physicians facing backlash within their professions while attempting to normalize abortion and other forms of reproductive medicine. Among the providers featured in the film is Dr. Andrea Chiavarini, MD, a Portland-based OBGYN who travels to Witchita, Kansas and Oklahoma City, Oklahoma monthly to perform abortions in areas which are lacking in providers. The film follows Chiavarini on her travels to the South and her work at the South Wind Women's Center. The film also centers around a group of providers in Seattle, WA, including Dr. Deborah Oyer, MD, and Dr. Sarah Prager. Contrasting Chiavarini's work in independent clinics, Prager and Oyer's story centers on how the increasing number of Catholic-owned hospitals in the Northwest do not perform abortions or employ such providers. The film also interviews Judith Arcana, a member of a pre-Roe v. Wade underground abortion collective called JANE.

In addition to following the work of 21st century providers, Our Bodies Our Doctors gives background context to the history of abortion, including some overview of Roe v. Wade.

== Development ==
Early development for Our Bodies Our Doctors began in 2016 with the production of two short films, directed by Haaken, called "Being There" and "Kuwepo," produced for the Providers Share team at the University of Michigan Ann Arbor. The short films aimed to "reclaim the visual culture" of abortion, which filmmakers state had previously been dominated by dark depictions of abortion and abortion providers, as well as carry out research into the work and backlash faced by abortion providers. Haaken's work on "Being There" eventually morphed into a feature-length documentary project.

An active participant in the feminist and reproductive rights movements since prior to the 1980s, director Jan Haaken, who previously had worked on documentaries surrounding the work of clinical psychologists, was inspired to research the work of abortion providers by witnessing ongoing violence and harassment they faced. Prior to filming, Haaken approached "maybe 40 or 50" providers to be featured in the film; of these, only a handful agreed, which Haaken feels is reflective of ongoing stigma and potential of violence surrounding abortion. About ten patients receiving abortions agreed to have their procedures filmed, with the agreement that their identities would be kept anonymous. Haaken has stated her hope that Our Bodies Our Doctors would bring the topic of abortion into everyday conversation and destigmatize abortion for both women seeking it and medical staff who provide it.

Haaken's background as a clinical psychologist and professor of psychology led the film to be structured using psychoanalytic principles. In this vein, Our Bodies Our Doctors often focuses in on the complex emotional dichotomies, such as experiencing both relief and grief, that occur in both women receiving abortions and the physicians providing those abortions.

== Response ==
Our Bodies Our Doctors has been endorsed by reproductive rights activists, including Gloria Steinem, congresswoman Pramila Jayapal, and former Planned Parenthood CEO Cecile Richards, and by Planned Parenthood.
