= Intermediate zone =

In Sri Aurobindo's philosophy, the Intermediate zone refers to a dangerous and misleading transitional spiritual state between the ordinary consciousness and true spiritual realisation.

Similar notions can be found in mystical literature, such as "the astral plane" and "the hall of illusion." The Theosophist W. Q. Judge used the similar notion of "astral intoxication".

== Aurobindo ==
=== Original use ===
The Intermediate Zone is first described in a letter to a disciple in the early 1930s. It was then published in 1933 in The Riddle of this World, a small booklet that includes several essays. The letter later appeared in Letters on Yoga. More recently, a number of copies have been posted on the Internet. A shorter but similar reference to a misleading intermediate consciousness, but without the distinguishing qualifier "zone", is also found in some of the later strata of The Synthesis of Yoga which dates to the early 1940s.

=== Characteristics ===
Aurobindo asserted that spiritual aspirants may pass through an intermediate zone where experiences of force, inspiration, illumination, light, joy, expansion, power, and freedom from normal limits are possible. These can become associated with personal aspirations, ambitions, notions of spiritual fulfilment and yogic siddhi, and even be falsely interpreted as full spiritual realisation. One can pass through this zone, and the associated spiritual dangers, without harm by perceiving its real nature, and seeing through the misleading experiences. Those who go astray in it may end in a spiritual disaster, or may remain stuck there and adopt some half-truth as the whole truth, or become an instrument of lesser powers of these transitional planes. According to Aurobindo, this happens to many sadhaks and yogis.

== William Q. Judge - Astral intoxication ==
In his posthumously published book, Vernal Blooms, Theosophist William Quan Judge (1851-1896) describes the dangers of "astral intoxication". He asserts that the astral plane, which is the same as that of our psychic senses, has endless powers of delusion. It has to be well understood before the student can stay there long without danger. He states that phenomena, such as astral lights, moments of peace and revelation, do not indicate spiritual advancement. To regard every picture seen in the astral light as a spiritual experience is like becoming drunk. Such indulgence only results in becoming satiated with a store of illusory appearances. True progress is dependent upon purity of motive, and conquest of known or ascertainable defects.

The dangers of astral intoxication or delusion are greatest for the person who revolves selfishly around himself. This may happen when one lacks the support and company of other sincere seekers. One

...must first dispel the inner darkness before trying to see into the darkness without; we must know ourselves before knowing things extraneous to ourselves.

== Paul Brunton ==
Paul Brunton included Sri Aurobindo's term of the "Intermediate Zone" as a name for a psychological and immature mystical level of delusion and subtle ego.

Brunton uses several terms, such as astral plane, the intermediate zone, the hall of illusion. Once there, egoism becomes stimulated by the subtle forces they have evoked, the emotional nature becomes more sensitive and more fluid, the imaginative power becomes more active and is less restrained. If a person then falls victim to spiritual error regarding this state, the result is swollen vanity, superstitious credulity, emotions run riot, and wild imagination. Brunton considered this a major factor in explaining the human wreckage found on the spiritual path.

== See also ==
- Abyss (Thelema)
- Barzakh, the intermediate zone in Islam.
- Spiritual bypass

== Sources ==
- Sri Aurobindo The Riddle of This World online
- ----- Letters on Yoga, Sri Aurobindo Ashram Press, Pondicherry (pp 1039–1046 of the third edition 1971).
- Sri Aurobindo The Synthesis of Yoga, fifth edition, Pondicherry: Sri Aurobindo Ashram, 1999, ISBN 81-7058-614-3 (paperback) ISBN 81-7058-615-1 (hardcover) online
- Paul Brunton, Notebooks of Paul Brunton, 1989 online
- W. Q. Judge, Vernal Blooms, Canadian Theosophical Association, Bombay India, 1946 online
