= John Welwood =

American psychotherapist (1943–2019)

John Welwood (March 12, 1943 – January 17, 2019) was an American clinical psychologist, psychotherapist, teacher, and author, known for integrating psychological and spiritual concepts. He was the Director of the East/West Psychology Program at the California Institute of Integral Studies in San Francisco, and an associate editor of Journal of Transpersonal Psychology.

A prominent figure in transpersonal psychology, he was a pioneer in integrating Western psychology and Eastern wisdom. He wrote eight books, including Challenge of the Heart (1985), Journey of the Heart (1990), and Love and Awakening (1996). His 2007 book, Perfect Love, Imperfect Relationships, won the 2007 Books for a Better Life Award.

His book Toward a Psychology of Awakening is an important synthesis of his earlier works and offers powerful insight into the nature of both western psychology and Buddhism, as well as the profound effects of meditation on the nature of mind.

Trained in existential psychology, Welwood earned a Ph.D. in clinical psychology from the University of Chicago in 1974, where he worked with Eugene Gendlin.

== Personal life ==
He lived in San Francisco, California with his wife, Jennifer, and taught integrated psychospiritual workshops along with his son, Bogar Nagaraj.

Welwood died on January 17, 2019, at age 75.

== Bibliography ==
- The Meeting of the Ways: Explorations in East/West Psychology (1979) ISBN 0-8052-0619-1
- Awakening the Heart (1983) ISBN 0-394-72182-9
- Challenge of The Heart: Love, Sex, and Intimacy in Changing Times (1985) ISBN 0-394-74200-1
- Journey of the Heart: The Path of Conscious Love (1990) ISBN 0-06-092742-9
- Ordinary Magic (1992) ISBN 0-87773-597-2
- Love and Awakening: Discovering the Sacred Path of Intimate Relationship (1996) ISBN 0-06-092797-6
- Toward a Psychology of Awakening (2000) ISBN 1-57062-540-9
- Perfect Love, Imperfect Relationships: Healing the Wound of the Heart (2006) ISBN 1-59030-262-1

== See also ==
- Spiritual bypass
