= Wright Institute =

Private graduate school, focused on psychology, based in Berkeley, California

The Wright Institute
- Motto: Educating Clinicians to Society
- Type: Private graduate school
- Established: 1968
- President: Peter Dybwad
- Academic staff: 121
- Postgraduates: 355
- Location: Berkeley, California, United States
- Campus: Urban
- Website: www.wi.edu

The Wright Institute is a private graduate school focused on psychology and located in Berkeley, California.

== History ==
The institute was founded by Nevitt Sanford in 1968. Dr. Sanford first gained prominence as a co-author of "The Authoritarian Personality," a study of anti-Semitism published in 1950. His co-authors included two refugees from Nazi persecution, Theodor Adorno and Else Frenkel-Brunswik.

Sanford believed strongly in the capacity of adults to continue to learn and grow throughout their lives. His developmental approach and emphasis on the possibilities of lifelong learning form a key part of the foundation on which the Wright's doctoral program is built.

Sanford was also influential in shaping American clinical psychology educational standards. In 1947, he was appointed by the American Psychological Association to the committee that established criteria for accrediting programs in clinical psychology.

From 1960, Sanford directed the Institute for the Study of Human Problems at Stanford University. In a 1988 interview, he gave his reasons for leaving Stanford as follows: "Christine, my wife, and I had never really left Berkeley in a psychological sense. We wanted to go home. In addition, no tradition-bound university is likely to lend a home to an institute bent on action". After an initial attempt to teach his ideas at the Berkeley Graduate Theological Union was unsuccessful, Sanford founded the Wright Institute with $25,000 in funding from Hopkins Funds, "a small foundation that gave support to unpopular causes".

In the same interview, Sanford described the origin of the institute's name:

When I talked to a lawyer to ask him to do the incorporating, he said, "You can't have a name like 'Institute for the Study of Human Problems' because all those names have long since been used up. Why don't you just get a name like the Salk Foundation or the Tavistock Institute that doesn't by itself mean anything, and then you can do whatever you please." I presented the problem to my wife and the next morning she said, "Why don't you call it the Wright Institute?" It turned out that Wright was her mother's maiden name, Elizabeth Wright. We needed a one-word thing, and something that rolls easily off the tongue. I felt right away that that was the name.

== Academics ==
The Wright Institute has two programs: a doctoral program in clinical psychology leading to a Psy.D. degree; and a master's program in counseling psychology leading to an M.A. degree.

The institute is accredited by the Accrediting Commission for Senior Colleges and Universities of the Western Association of Schools and Colleges (WASC). The Doctor of Psychology (Psy.D.) in Clinical Psychology program is accredited by the American Psychological Association's Committee on Accreditation and the Master of Arts in Counseling Psychology program is approved by the Board of Behavioral Sciences (BBS). The MA program is designed to meet the requirements defined in the California Business and Professions (B&P) Code Sections 4980.37 and 4980.40 which cover the statutes and regulations relating to the practice of marriage and family therapy.

== Notable alumni ==
- Alan Briskin, M.A. and Ph.D. Organizational Psychology, 1984
- Derek Draper, M.A. Psychology, 2004
- Peter Gabel, Ph.D. Clinical Psychology, 1981
- Jan Haaken, Ph.D. Social and Clinical Psychology, 1979
- Michael Lerner, Ph.D. Social and Clinical Psychology, 1977
- Joseph E. Marshall, Ph.D. Clinical Psychology, 1997
- Amalia Mesa-Bains, Ph.D. Clinical Psychology, 1983
- Suzanne Segal
- Don W. Kreger

== Notable faculty ==
- Terry Kupers

== Notable former employees ==
- Charles Hampden-Turner
- Stephen Nachmanovitch
