= Spreadthink =

Spreadthink is a kind of conceptual pathology of groups unable to reach any "genuine consensus, or even majority view toward component aspects of a complex issue". The word was coined by systems researcher and mathematical cybernetician John N. Warfield to describe ineffective thinking in groups. Warfield said that this collective condition is generally neither recognized nor usually compensated for. Spreadthink reflects the fact that any time a group meets to work together on a complex issue using ordinary and familiar group processes, the individuals in the group will not agree on what are the most important sub-issues, and in general will not have a majority view on the merits of any of the many sub-issues.

In contrast to groupthink, spreadthink is a quantifiable psychosocial phenomenon that occurs within diversified groups of people. It is the mode of thinking that happens when different perspectives on a truly complex problem are convened for the purposes of understanding the complex situation. The desire for expressing authentic individual voices about the situation exceeds the desire for harmony in a simplistic decision-making process. Group members try to minimize reasons for individually defecting – or leaving the group that is trying to collectively deal with the complexity. Defection results from individuals who feel that their strongly held perspectives are not included in the definition of the situation.

Warfield cautioned, "Facilitators who try to bring groups to a majority view or a consensus without the aid of some methodology that resolves the difficulties caused by Spreadthink may well be driving the group to Groupthink, and thus helping to arrive at a decision that lacks individual support and, usually, lacks substance."

Spreadthink needs to be understood in the context of the nominal group technique (NGT), interpretive structural modeling (ISM) and interactive management (IM) developed by Warfield and his team. One further outcome was the phenomenon of erroneous priorities effect (EPE) first demonstrated as a spreadthink (group) pathology by Kevin Dye as a central element of evolutionary learning.
