= Alan Briskin =

American sociologist

- Occupation: author
- Website: alanbriskin.com

Alan Briskin is an American sociologist. He is an adjunct professor at Saybrook University.

After graduating from Goddard College in 1974, Briskin earned an M.A. and PhD in organizational psychology from the Wright Institute in Berkeley, California, in 1984. He has since published or contributed to several books on the concepts of "soul" and "spirit" in organizational theory, and on the rôle of collective wisdom in the work environment, and has discussed anger among employees. He is an advisor to the Goi Peace Foundation in Tokyo.

Daily Miracles, co-authored with Jan Boller, won an American Journal of Nursing "Book of the Year Award" in the category "public interest and creative works", and was chosen as the President's Pick by the American Association of Critical-Care Nurses.

== Books ==
- The Stirring of Soul in the Workplace, Jossey-Bass (1996), Berrett-Koehler (1998)
- Bringing Your Soul to Work: An Everyday Practice, Berrett-Koehler (2000) [with co-author Cheryl Peppers]
- Centered on the Edge: Mapping a Field of Collective Intelligence and Spiritual Wisdom (2001) [with co-author Sheryl Erickson]
- Daily Miracles: Stories and Practices of Humanity and Excellence in Health Care, Sigma Theta Tau, Honor Society of Nursing (2006) [with co-author Jan Boller, RN, PhD]
- The Power of Collective Wisdom: And the Trap of Collective Folly, Berrett-Koehler (2009) [with co-authors Sheryl Erickson, John Ott, Tom Callanan]
- Deep Dialogue: Harvesting Collective Wisdom in The Transforming Leader: New Approaches to Leadership for the Twenty-First Century, edited by Carol Pearson, Berret-Koehler (2012)
