= Walk of the Heroines =

Memorial and park in Portland, Oregon, U.S.

- Location within Oregon
- Location: Portland, Oregon, U.S.
- Coordinates: 45°30′43.5″N 122°41′13″W

The Walk of the Heroines is a memorial and park on the Portland State University campus in Portland, Oregon.

== Description ==
The 18,000-square-foot park, "designed to give artistic recognition to women's vital contributions to our society and daily life", is along Southwest Harrison between 10th and 11th Avenues. It features walls inscribed with the names of more than 1,000 women, including Hillary Clinton, Amy Jacques Garvey, and Barbara Roberts. Mother Joseph Pariseau is also honored. John Laursen contributed to the project. Linda Stein designed the memorial's bronze torso sculptures.

== Reception ==
In Portland Monthly's list of "The Weirdest, Most Wonderful Memorials and Museums in Portland (and Beyond)" Margaret Seiler wrote, "Many of the honorees and engraved quotes along the walkway have a ’90s-era, usual-suspects, herstory vibe, but lines from Nation columnist Katha Pollitt and novelist Arundhati Roy bring the walk into the 21st century."

== See also ==
- List of parks in Portland, Oregon
- List of public art in Portland, Oregon
