= Derealization =

Perception that the external world is not real

Derealization is a dissociative phenomenon characterized by an alteration in the perception of the external world, causing those with the condition to perceive it as unreal, distant, distorted, or in other ways falsified. Other symptoms include feeling as if one's environment lacks spontaneity, emotional coloring, and depth. Described as "Experiences of unreality or detachment with respect to surroundings (e.g., individuals or objects are experienced as unreal, dreamlike, foggy, lifeless or visually distorted)" in the DSM-5, it is a dissociative symptom that may appear in moments of severe stress.

Derealization is a subjective experience pertaining to a person's perception of the outside world, while depersonalization is a related symptom characterized by dissociation from one's own body and mental processes. The two are commonly experienced in conjunction but can also occur independently.

Chronic derealization is fairly rare, and may be caused by occipital–temporal dysfunction. Experiencing derealization for long periods of time or having recurring episodes can be indicative of many psychological disorders, and can cause significant distress and may cause those experiencing it to start questioning reality. Chronic derealization is estimated to occur in between 0.95% and 2.4% of the general population. Derealization is equally prevalent amongst men and women, while the onset usually occurs in adolescence; only 5% of cases of chronic derealization occur in those older than 25. Temporary derealization symptoms are commonly experienced by the general population a few times throughout their lives, with a lifetime prevalence of 26%–74% and a prevalence of 31%–66% at the time of a traumatic event.

Derealization is linked to childhood trauma, with its severity correlating directly with the reported severity of childhood maltreatment.

== Description ==
The experience of derealization can be described as feeling as if a substance separates a person from the outside world, such as a sensory fog, pane of glass, or veil. The person may feel as if they are viewing their surroundings through VR glasses, through glass, or on a movie screen. Some report that what they see lacks vividness and emotional coloring. Emotional response to visual recognition of loved ones may be significantly reduced. Feelings of déjà vu or jamais vu are common. One may not be sure whether what one perceives is real. The world may seem as if it were going through a dolly zoom effect. Such perceptual abnormalities may also extend to hearing, taste, and smell. An important differentiation between hallucination and derealization is that one does not hear, see, or experience things that are not real or visible during derealization; rather, one experiences their surroundings as distant or dreamlike. During this state of altered perception, one is aware of the feeling's subjective nature.

The degree of familiarity one has with one's surroundings is among one's sensory and psychological identity, memory foundation, and history when experiencing a place. People experiencing derealization block this identifying foundation from recall. This "blocking effect" creates a discrepancy of correlation between one's perception of one's surroundings during derealization and what one would perceive in its absence.

Frequently, derealization occurs in the context of constant worrying or "intrusive thoughts" that one finds hard to switch off. In such cases it can build unnoticed along with the underlying anxiety attached to these disturbing thoughts, and be recognized only in the aftermath of a realization of crisis, often a panic attack, subsequently seeming difficult or impossible to ignore. This type of anxiety can be crippling to the affected and may lead to avoidant behavior. Those who experience this phenomenon may feel concern over the cause of their derealization. It is often difficult to accept that such a disturbing symptom is simply a result of anxiety, and one may think the cause must be something more serious. This can, in turn, cause more anxiety and worsen the derealization. Derealization has also been shown to interfere with the learning process, with cognitive impairments demonstrated in immediate recall and visuospatial deficits. This can be best understood as the feeling of seeing events in third person.

== Causes ==
Derealization can accompany the neurological conditions of epilepsy (particularly temporal lobe epilepsy), migraine, and mild TBI (head injury). There is a similarity between visual hypo-emotionality, a reduced emotional response to viewed objects, and derealization. This suggests a disruption of the process by which perception becomes emotionally colored. This qualitative change in the experiencing of perception may lead to reports of anything viewed being unreal or detached.

The instances of recurring or chronic derealization among those who have experienced extreme trauma and/or have post-traumatic stress (PTSD) have been studied closely in many scientific studies, whose results indicate a strong link between the disorders, with a disproportionate amount of post traumatic stress patients reporting recurring feelings of derealization and depersonalization (up to 30% of those with the condition) in comparison to the general populace (only around 2%), especially in those who experienced the trauma in childhood. Many possibilities have been suggested by various psychologists to help explain these findings, the most widely accepted including that experiencing trauma can cause individuals to distance themselves from their surroundings and perception, with the aim of subsequently distancing themselves from the trauma and (especially in the case of depersonalization) their emotional response to it. This could be either as a deliberate coping mechanism or an involuntary, reflexive response depending on circumstance. This possibly not only increases the risk of experiencing problems with derealization and its corresponding disorder, but with all relevant dissociative disorders. In the case of childhood trauma, not only are children more likely to be susceptible to such a response as they are less able to implement more healthy strategies to deal with the emotional implications of experiencing trauma, there is also a lot of evidence that shows trauma can have a substantial detrimental effect on learning and development, especially since those who experience trauma in childhood are far less likely to have received adequate parenting.

Some neurophysiological studies have noted disturbances arising from the frontal-temporal cortex, which could explain the correlation found between derealization symptoms and temporal lobe disorders. This is further supported by reports of people with frontal lobe epilepsy, with those with epilepsy of the dorsal premotor cortex reporting symptoms of depersonalization, while those with temporal lobe epilepsy reported experiencing derealization symptoms.

Derealization is a common psychosomatic symptom seen in various anxiety disorders, especially hypochondria.

One study suggested multiple explanations for derealization, one of which being the "intrusions of sleep elements into waking consciousness", because derealization has been described as "dream-like", and because derealization is related to low levels of norepinephrine, a neurotransmitter regulating alertness, in the urine. These all suggest a link between derealization and depersonalization and abnormalities in sleep and wakefulness. Another explanation in the same vein is poor sleep quality, which contributes to rumination— repetitively focusing on one's own distress and the circumstances surrounding such distress— and seems to either bring about or increase symptoms of derealization. Rumination and derealization were found to be linked, as those individuals who had high levels of rumination were more likely to report symptoms of derealization. Finally, the study suggested that maladaptive emotional regulation was linked to derealization, and that poor emotional regulation, when combined with high levels of rumination and poor sleep quality, could be the cause of depersonalization and derealization disorder.

There is a positive correlation between fatigue and derealization symptoms. Emotional suppression is also linked to derealization symptoms. A study by Tibubos et al. showed that those who reappraised their emotions, meaning those who changed the way they assessed their situation and their capacity to manage it, thus altering its emotional impact, were less likely to experience derealization. Conversely, those who suppressed their emotions were both more fatigued and more likely to experience derealization and depersonalization symptoms.

Derealization is often comorbid with depression and anxiety. Symptoms of derealization are associated with symptoms of both depression and anxiety in the long-term, and those who experience chronic derealization seem to be more likely to experience depressive and anxious symptoms. Even when controlling for factors like treatment history, family history of mental disorders, childhood trauma, and sociodemographic status, many people who experience derealization also have depression and/or anxiety disorders. However, those who experience derealization are also less likely to experience bodily symptoms of anxiety, compared to those who have anxiety but not derealization, which may reflect the feelings of detachment from the body caused by derealization.

Researchers used brain fMRI to check the neural responses of those suffering from derealization and depersonalization to both aversive and neutral images. They found that the derealised patients "rated the aversive, disgusting scenes as less emotive than control subjects and, in response to these stimuli, showed reduced activation in structures implicated in the perception of disgust." While the derealised patients understood the content of the aversive pictures they were shown, they did not experience an emotional response, while the control group did, showing that the neural and behavioural responses of those experiencing derealization and depersonalization were impaired.

Derealization and dissociative symptoms have been linked by some studies to various physiological and psychological differences in individuals and their environments. It was remarked that labile sleep-wake cycles (labile meaning more easily roused) with some distinct changes in sleep, such as dream-like states, hypnogogic, hypnopompic hallucinations, night-terrors and other disorders related to sleep could possibly be causative or improve symptoms to a degree. Derealization can also be a symptom of severe sleep disorders and mental disorders like depersonalization-derealization disorder, borderline personality disorder, bipolar disorder, schizophrenia, dissociative identity disorder, and other mental conditions.

Cannabis, psychedelics, dissociatives, antidepressants, caffeine, nitrous oxide, albuterol, and nicotine can all produce feelings of derealization, or sensations mimicking them, particularly when taken in excess. It can also result from alcohol withdrawal or benzodiazepine withdrawal. Tramadol withdrawal can also cause feelings of derealization, often alongside psychotic symptoms such as anxiety, paranoia and hallucinations. Generally, when derealization is induced by cannabis, symptoms do not last longer than the period of intoxication, generally subsiding within about 2 hours of exposure. However, a small group of those who use cannabis may experience derealization symptoms lasting weeks, months, or years, even after they stop using cannabis. The most significant factor for this chronic cannabis-induced derealization seems to be a history of anxiety, and young, anxiety-prone males who use cannabis under "marked distress" are particularly at risk.

Derealization symptoms may also be experienced after playing video games, particularly after using virtual-reality headsets. A study of 40 participants found that those who used VR headsets while playing The Elder Scrolls V: Skyrim reported significantly more derealization symptoms than those who played on a PC. Researchers hypothesised that using VR headsets, as opposed to the PC, induced "stronger levels of realness towards the newly experienced virtual world, which casts into doubt the so far experienced ordinary world."

Interoceptive exposure exercises have been used in research settings as a means to induce derealization, as well as the related phenomenon depersonalization, in people who are sensitive to high levels of anxiety. Exercises with documented successes include timed intervals of hyperventilation or staring at a mirror, dot, or spiral.

== Treatment ==
In the past, treatments like anticonvulsants, stimulants, and electroconvulsive therapy were tested, but were not effective in reducing symptoms.

There is evidence to suggest that cognitive behavioural therapy is effective in treating derealization symptoms, especially through cognitive reappraisal of catastrophizing thoughts, reducing avoidance behavior, and self-observation. Therapy has been shown to reduce the severity of chronic derealization and other comorbidities, like anxiety and depression, in the long-term.

Currently, chronic derealization is generally treated using medication. These drugs include antidepressants, antiepileptics, and antipsychotics. Serotonin reuptake inhibitors (SSRIs) may be prescribed. They mediate serotonergic dysregulation, which is when the body does not have enough serotonin, thought to be a possible cause of depersonalization-derealization disorder.

== See also ==
- Alice in Wonderland syndrome
- Brain fog
- Śūnyatā
- Ego death
- Dissociative disorders
- Existential crisis
- Mystical psychosis
- Narcissistic withdrawal
- Spiritual emergency
- Solipsism syndrome
- Fugue state
- Reality
- Spectacle
- Falling (sensation)
- Weltschmerz
- Sleep deprivation
- Neoplatonism
