= Spiritual bypass =

Spirituality as avoidance of unresolved psychological issues

Spiritual bypass or spiritual bypassing is a "tendency to use spiritual ideas and practices to sidestep or avoid facing unresolved emotional issues, psychological wounds, and unfinished developmental tasks". The term was introduced in the mid 1980s by John Welwood, a Buddhist teacher and psychotherapist. Clinicians in pastoral psychology have identified both beneficial and detrimental manifestations of behavior that could be described as spiritual bypass.

== Background ==
American psychologist John Welwood coined the term in 1984 after noting that some people, by resorting to spirituality to avoid difficult or painful emotions or challenges, tended to suppress aspects of their identity and needs and stall their emotional development.

== Clinical significance and treatment ==
Clinicians do not necessarily regard spiritual bypass as unhealthy when it is utilized as a temporary approach to coping with acute stress or an intense "spiritual emergency". Furthermore, some researchers have argued that certain behaviors labelled as "spiritual bypassing" may simply be a normal and even inevitable stage of any approach to spiritual development.

On the other hand, when spiritual bypass is used as a long-term strategy for ignoring or suppressing unaddressed mental health issues, negative consequences can include "the need to excessively control others and oneself, shame, anxiety, dichotomous thinking, emotional confusion, exaggerated tolerance of inappropriate behavior, codependence, compulsive kindness, obsession or addiction, spiritual narcissism, blind allegiance to charismatic teachers, and disregard for personal responsibility". In cases where it is deemed detrimental, spiritual bypass may be addressed with various forms of psychotherapy, including focusing and motivational interviewing, although there is little evidence on which to base treatment aside from anecdotes and individual case reports.

== Limitations of research ==
Existing research has been limited by relatively homogeneous sampling, and there is a need for more cross-cultural studies to provide a "more global perspective" and explore the concept's relevance to diverse populations.

== See also ==
=== Buddhist concepts ===
- Buddhism and psychology
- Five faults and eight antidotes
- Five hindrances
- Kenshō § Training after kenshō
- Kleshas (Buddhism)
- Ten fetters

=== Other religious concepts ===
- Intermediate zone
- Spiritual materialism
- Vāsanā

=== Western psychological concepts ===
- Avoidance coping
- Defence mechanisms
- Erikson's stages of psychosocial development
- Experiential avoidance
- Introspection illusion
- Psychological mindedness
- Psychological repression
- Psychological resistance
- Resistance (creativity)
- Wishful thinking

== Sources ==
- Clarke, Philip B.; Giordano, Amanda L.; Cashwell, Craig S.; Lewis, Todd F. (January 2013). "The straight path to healing: using motivational interviewing to address spiritual bypass". Journal of Counseling & Development. 91 (1): 87–94. doi:10.1002/j.1556-6676.2013.00075.x. "Spiritual bypass is a phenomenon that commonly arises when working with clients regarding the spiritual dimension. Spiritual bypass is defined as the use of one's spirituality, spiritual beliefs, spiritual practices, and spiritual life to avoid experiencing the emotional pain of working through psychological issues (Welwood, 2000). This trap entails actively seeking spiritual highs as a means to avoid processing underlying psychological pain (B. H. Whitfield, 1995). One way to address the issue of spiritual bypass in counseling is to use the techniques, interventions, and processes of motivational interviewing (MI). MI is a counseling framework used to encourage positive behavior change in clients (Miller, 1983)."
- Fossella, Tina; Welwood, John (Spring 2011). "Human nature, buddha nature: an interview with John Welwood" (PDF). Tricycle: The Buddhist Review. 20 (3). "Being a good spiritual practitioner can become what I call a compensatory identity that covers up and defends against an underlying deficient identity, where we feel badly about ourselves, not good enough, or basically lacking. Then, although we may be practicing diligently, our spiritual practice can be used in the service of denial and defense. And when spiritual practice is used to bypass our real-life human issues, it becomes compartmentalized in a separate zone of our life, and remains unintegrated with our overall functioning. [...] In my psychotherapy practice I often work with dharma students who have engaged in spiritual practice for decades. I respect how their practice has been beneficial for them. Yet despite the sincerity as practitioners, their practice is not fully penetrating their life. They seek out psychological work because they remain wounded and not fully developed on the emotional/relational/personal level, and they may be acting out their wounding in harmful ways."
- Fox, J.; Cashwell, C. S.; Picciotto, G. (2017). "The opiate of the masses: Measuring spiritual bypass and its relationship to spirituality, religion, mindfulness, psychological distress, and personality". Spirituality in Clinical Practice. 4 (4): 274–287. doi:10.1037/scp0000141. S2CID 148709599. "A major limitation to the literature on spiritual bypass is that no psychometrically sound measures of the phenomenon exist, thus preventing scholars and clinicians from understanding its causes and treatment implications beyond anecdotal case reports."
- Masís, Katherine V. (2002). "American Zen and psychotherapy: an ongoing dialogue". In Young-Eisendrath, Polly; Muramoto, Shoji (eds.). Awakening and insight: Zen Buddhism and psychotherapy. Hove, East Sussex; New York: Brunner-Routledge. pp. 147–167. ISBN 0415217938. OCLC 47805052. "Through deepened concentration, the practitioner's mind may be significantly calmed during meditation, but negative emotional states may return after meditating because they were suppressed rather than examined and worked through (Cooper 1999). While thoughts, feelings, and fantasies may be made more available for scrutiny, non-judgmental attentiveness to their emergence while ignoring their meaning may not be enough (Rubin 1996). [...] Consciously or unconsciously, Western meditation practitioners may use their meditation practice to avoid facing developmental tasks or old psychic wounds that would be better dealt with in psychotherapy. Quite a few meditation teachers convey the message that enlightenment or seeing through the false self gets to the root of human suffering, and thereby eradicates personal emotional difficulties. Unfortunately, this is not the case. Enlightenment is seeing through the illusion of self, but is not necessarily a way to heal a wounded self. [...] Enlightenment experiences may be temporarily healing, but if old wounds are still operating, the practitioner will be unable to integrate those experiences into his or her daily life and may be using spirituality to avoid dealing with those very wounds (Kornfield 1993a; 1993b). [...] Welwood coined the equally well-known phrase of 'spiritual bypassing', or 'the tendency to try to avoid or prematurely transcend basic human needs, feelings and developmental tasks' (Welwood 2000:64)."
- Picciotto, Gabriela; Fox, Jesse (2018). "Exploring experts' perspectives on spiritual bypass: a conventional content analysis". Pastoral Psychology. 67: 65–84. doi:10.1007/s11089-017-0796-7. S2CID 148802362.
- Picciotto, Gabriela; Fox, Jesse; Neto, Félix (2018). "A phenomenology of spiritual bypass: causes, consequences, and implications". Journal of Spirituality in Mental Health. 20 (4): 333–354. doi:10.1080/19349637.2017.1417756. hdl:10216/110042. S2CID 148705422.
- Welwood, John (2000) [1984]. "Between heaven and earth: principles of inner work". Toward a psychology of awakening: Buddhism, psychotherapy, and the path of personal and spiritual transformation. Boston: Shambhala Publications. pp. 11–21. ISBN 1570625409. OCLC 42397510. "A complete path of inner development [...] must involve all three principles—grounding, letting go, and awakening the heart—which counteract the obstacles of spiritual bypassing, egocentric self-involvement, and numbing distraction. The core element of such a path would be an awareness practice such as meditation, which helps connect us with all three principles. Along with that, a method of psychological inquiry is extremely helpful for addressing the unconscious patterns and emotion complexes."
