= Inner child =

In psychology, a person's childlike aspect

In some schools of popular psychology and analytical psychology, the inner child is an individual's childlike aspect. It includes what a person learned as a child before puberty. The inner child is often conceived as a semi-independent subpersonality subordinate to the waking conscious mind. The term has therapeutic applications in counseling and health settings.

The theoretical roots of the inner child trace back to Carl Jung’s divine child archetype, which he saw as both an individual and collective symbol of renewal and transformation. The Jungian Child archetype led to the concept of the inner child. It has been defined as “all the past hidden ages” within a person’s life journey, consisting of memories and emotional layers from each stage of development that influence the formation of identity.

Psychologists have explored the role of the inner child in influencing adult behaviour. Lamagna (2011) explored how overwhelming emotional experiences in early life can shape present-day emotional functioning and relational patterns by remaining outside of conscious awareness. The inner child is often considered as the vulnerable and hidden childlike part of a person with playfulness and creativity, but also accompanied by anger, hurt and fear from the early childhood experiences with caregivers.

The concept became known to a broader audience through books by John Bradshaw and others. Bradshaw (2005) emphasised that by acknowledging the inner child, individuals could awaken their true selves and heal past emotional wounds. These perspectives collectively affirm that the inner child will continue to influence an individual's sense of identity, emotional well-being, and relationships throughout life.

== Origins ==
=== Early Psychoanalysis ===
Sigmund Freud emphasised the lasting impact of early childhood experiences on adult emotional life, especially unresolved conflicts and repressed memories from psychosexual developmental stages. Although Freud did not use the term “inner child,” his work laid the foundation for later theorists.

=== Carl Jung’s Contribution ===
Carl Jung expanded on these ideas with his theory of archetypes, introducing the “Divine Child” as a symbol of innocence and potential, and later the “wounded child” as part of the individuation process of integrating unconscious material into a unified self. Jung’s ideas contributed significantly to the symbolic and psychological basis for the inner child.

=== 1970-1980s: Rise of Self-Help and Humanistic Psychology ===
In the late 20th century, the inner child became a prominent theme in therapeutic and self-help literature focused on healing childhood trauma.

One method of reparenting the inner child in therapy was originated by art therapist Lucia Capacchione in 1976 and documented in her book Recovery of Your Inner Child (1991). Using art therapy and journaling techniques, her method includes a "nurturing parent" and "protective parent" within "inner family work" to care for a person's physical, emotional, creative and spiritual needs (her definition of the inner child). It also posits a "critical parent within" and provides tools for managing it. Charles L. Whitfield dubbed the inner child the "child within" in his book Healing the Child Within: Discovery and Recovery for Adult Children of Dysfunctional Families (1987). Penny Park's book Rescuing the Inner Child (1990) provided a program for contacting and recovering the inner child.

In his television shows, and in books such as Homecoming: Reclaiming and Championing Your Inner Child (1990), John Bradshaw, a U.S. educator, pop psychology and self-help movement leader, used "inner child" to point to unresolved childhood experiences and the lingering dysfunctional effects of childhood dysfunction: the sum of mental-emotional memories stored in the sub-conscious from conception thru pre-puberty.

== Therapeutic Approaches ==
A range of therapeutic modalities incorporates the concept of the inner child to address emotional wounds rooted in early life experiences.

Bradshaw’s Recover Therapy is designed to help patients reconnect with their inner child to address maladaptive emotional and behavioural patterns developed with early childhood experiences. It involves group therapy and the practice of reparenting. Group therapy allows group members to express themselves and receive peer feedback to learn new behaviours and interactions that can be transferred to the real world. Reparenting means learning to acknowledge and love one's inner child. This allows an individual to offer oneself the care and support that may have been absent in childhood, improving emotional stability.

The concept of the inner child is also present in psychosynthesis and psychotherapy. Within the framework of psychosynthesis, the inner child is often characterized as a subpersonality or may also be seen as a central element surrounded by subpersonalities. Therapy in this tradition aims to bring these inner parts into the conscious part of the personality and foster their integration in a more unified self.

Internal Family Systems therapy (IFS therapy) posits that there is not just one inner child sub-personality, but many. IFS therapy calls wounded inner child sub-personalities "exiles" because they tend to be excluded from waking thought in order to avoid/defend against the pain carried in those memories. IFS therapy has a method that aims to gain safe access to a person's exiles, witnessing the stories of their origins in childhood, and healing them.

Cognitive-behavioural therapy (CBT), although not traditionally centred on the concept of the inner child, shares some conceptual similarities. Aaron Beck’s discovery of automatic thoughts emphasises how early experiences shape ongoing emotional and behavioural patterns. Beck found that these automated processes can be brought into conscious awareness and examined during therapy. These automatic thoughts can be seen as manifestations of the "inner child" in the adult self. In CBT, individuals can identify and modify beliefs and behaviours shaped by childhood experiences. This process parallels inner child therapy in its focus on addressing patterns rooted in childhood to support emotional well-being and behavioural change.

Music therapy may also incorporate inner child work. Techniques such as vocal holding and regression are used to access repressed emotions and experiences. Therapeutic regression enables clients to revisit events, regain lost feelings, and reunite pieces of themselves. Vocal holding can evoke a pre-verbal, early-attachment phase in a client’s life because no words are used. These are combined with re-examing prior events and experiences to help clients understand and connect with suppressed emotions and facilitate self-acceptance.

== Empirical Support and Research ==
While the concept of the inner child is mainly metaphorical, it has been extensively researched in terms of therapeutic approaches. These studies suggest that inner child-oriented therapies may improve mental conditions by addressing unresolved childhood experiences.

A clinical trial by Hodgdon et al. (2021) examined the efficacy of IFS therapy in adults with post-traumatic stress disorder (PTSD) and histories of childhood trauma. The study found statistically and clinically significant reductions in PTSD and depressive symptoms. At a one-month follow-up, 92% of participants no longer met the diagnostic criteria (DSM-IV-TR) for PTSD, indicating the potential of IFS therapy in addressing trauma-related psychopathology through inner child-focused subpersonalities.

Moreover, Edalat et al. (2022) evaluated the effectiveness of a reparenting-based intervention using the self-attachment technique. It focuses on building a nurturing bond between the adult self and an internalised childhood self, aiming to heal emotional wounds. The results showed statistically significant improvements in the symptoms of chronic depression and anxiety among female participants with a large effect size after eight one-to-one sessions.

Attachment theory also provides an indirect empirical foundation for inner child concepts. Bowlby’s model suggested that early attachment experience creates ‘internal working models’ that influence emotional regulation and attachment patterns throughout life. This framework resonates with the inner child concept, where unmet childhood needs continue to affect later life.

== Criticism ==
Despite some promising therapeutic outcomes, the inner child concept has been subject to significant academic criticism. Critics argue that the inner child lacks falsifiability, an essential criterion for scientific validity according to Karl Popper (1963). Since it is framed metaphorically and not operationalised in measurable terms, it resists empirical testing and classification as a scientific theory. This challenges its standing as a psychological construct.

Furthermore, most studies are based on qualitative data or self-report measures, which lack validity. Lilienfeld et al. (2013) argue that cognitive biases can influence subjective reports from clients and clinicians and, therefore, cannot replace controlled empirical research. Moreover, many studies supporting inner child-based therapies rely on small sample sizes, lacking generalisability. This makes it difficult to draw definitive conclusions about the effectiveness of inner child therapies.

Large-scale, controlled studies directly validating the inner child as a psychological construct remain limited. Most available research assesses outcomes of therapeutic practices referencing the concept, rather than testing it as an independent variable.

== See also ==
- Adult child
- Developmental needs meeting strategy – Psychotherapy approach for adults with psychological trauma
- Kidult
- Inner critic – Concept in psychology to describe a subpersonality that judges and demeans oneself
- Schema therapy § Schema modes – Momentary mind states in response to difficult situations
- Manchild
