= Developmental needs meeting strategy =

Psychotherapy approach

The developmental needs meeting strategy (DNMS) is a psychotherapy approach developed by Shirley Jean Schmidt. It is designed to treat adults with psychological trauma wounds (such as those inflicted by verbal, physical, and sexual abuse) and with attachment wounds (such as those inflicted by parental rejection, neglect, and enmeshment). The DNMS is an ego state therapy based on the assumption that the degree to which developmental needs were not adequately met is the degree to which a client may be stuck in childhood. This model aims to identify ego states that are stuck in the past and help them get unstuck by remediating those unmet developmental needs. The processing starts with the DNMS therapist guiding a patient to mobilize three internal Resource ego states: a Nurturing Adult Self, a Protective Adult Self, and a Spiritual Core Self. The therapist then guides these three Resources to gently help wounded child ego states get unstuck from the past by meeting their unmet developmental needs, helping them process through painful emotions, and by establishing an emotional bond. The relationship wounded child parts have with these Resources is considered the primary agent for change.

Alternating bilateral stimulation (made popular by EMDR therapy) is applied at key points in the protocol to enhance the process. The DNMS focuses special attention on healing maladaptive introjects (wounded ego states that mimic abusive, neglectful, or dysfunctional caregivers). The model assumes that these ego states cause the most trouble for clients, so helping them heal may result in a significant benefit—leading to a decrease in unwanted behaviors, beliefs, and emotions.

== Ego states / parts of self ==
According to Daniel Siegel, a state of mind can become engrained when a positive event is experienced repeatedly; when a negative event is experienced repeatedly; or when a traumatic event is overwhelming. The DNMS assumes engrained states of mind can become sub-personalities, parts of self, or ego states with a point of view. Some parts form by reacting to others, while others form by introjecting others.

Introjection is the unconscious internalization of another person's behaviors, ideas, values, or points of view. An introject is an internal representation of another person. The DNMS assumes an introject can form when mirror neurons fire during significantly positive or negative relationship events. Neuroimaging studies have demonstrated that certain neural circuits get activated in a person who is carrying out an action, expressing an emotion, or experiencing a sensation, and in a person who is observing that person's action, emotion, or sensation.

Vittorio Gallese, one of the discoverers of mirror neurons, calls this shared activation. He believes shared activation of neural circuits leads to embodied simulation. Embodied simulation means that internal representations of the body states associated with the actions, emotions, and sensations of the observed are evoked in the observer, 'as if' he or she were doing a similar action or experiencing a similar emotion or sensation. Gallese believes this process to be a basic functional mechanism of the brain, which engages automatically and unconsciously, not the result of a willed or conscious cognitive effort, not aimed at interpreting the intentions of others. This suggests that the formation of introjects of the significant people in our lives, is a biological reflex that—for better or worse—we have no control over.

Parts of self can interact with each other like family members—for example, cooperatively, antagonistically, or both. They can have competing agendas, which can lead to internal conflicts. The DNMS is an ego state therapy. Like other ego state therapies, it aims to help individual wounded ego states heal, and encourage cooperation and integration between ego states. (Other ego state therapies include psychosynthesis, Gestalt therapy, transactional analysis, Internal Family Systems Therapy, Voice Dialogue, and inner child psychotherapy.)

=== Healthy parts of self ===
According to this hypothesis, healthy parts of self form in response to positive, affirming relationships with role models who are loving and attuned. They live in the present; feel and manage the full range of emotions; hold positive beliefs about self and world; engage in appropriate, desirable behaviors; and have an adaptive point of view. Some healthy parts of self may be adaptive introjects, or internal representations of caring, supporting people. A DNMS therapist will help a patient mobilize healthy, internal, Resource ego states that can reparent wounded parts of self to help them heal.

=== Wounded parts of self ===
Siegel argues that wounded parts of self form in response to traumas; and to negative, wounding relationships with role models who are abusive, neglectful, rejecting, and enmeshing. They live in the past; are stuck in painful emotions; hold negative, irrational beliefs about self and world; engage in unwanted or inappropriate behaviors; and have a maladaptive point of view. The DNMS model presumes two categories of wounded ego states—reactive parts and maladaptive introjects.

==== Reactive parts ====
According to Siegel, reactive parts of self form in reaction to significantly wounding experiences. People are usually very aware of the problem behaviors, beliefs, or emotions of reactive parts. There are many types of reactive parts. Some hold raw emotions, like anxiety, terror, anger, sadness, grief, despair, shame, and hopelessness. Some hold reactions to specific traumatic experiences. Some cope with painful emotions with pain-avoidant behaviors like withdrawing, drinking, or overeating. Some cope with painful emotions with self-punishing behaviors like cutting, starving, or isolating. Some rebel with risky or self-destructive behaviors like drinking, smoking, or engaging in unprotected sex. Some try to manage hurtful people with strategic pleasing behaviors like complying or overachieving. Some try to prevent attacks from others by engaging in aggressive behaviors—putting up a façade of strength, intimidation, control, or power. And some try to control other parts of self with warnings, threats, commands, or admonitions intended to encourage behaviors that please others or discourage behaviors that might upset others.

==== Maladaptive introjects ====
According to this hypothesis, maladaptive introject is a part of self that forms when mirror neurons fire in the presence of a significant role model who is physically or emotionally wounding (such as an abusive or rejecting parent.) In the DNMS model a maladaptive introject is conceptualized as a part of self with an intrinsically good true nature that is unwillingly wearing a mask or costume that conveys the role model's wounding messages. The mask is the mirror neuron's engrained recording of a past wounding experience.

When the mask is activated (or when the recording plays) the wounding message is directed to reactive parts who perceive the wounding experience from the past is still happening in the present. (The relationship between maladaptive introjects and reactive parts in the DNMS model is similar to the relationship between top dog and underdog parts in the Gestalt model.)

== Interventions ==
The DNMS endeavors to get maladaptive introjects unstuck from the past. This is intended to stop the internal conflict generated between wounding introjects masks and wounded reactive parts.

The processing starts with the Resource Development Protocol. This protocol strengthens a client's connection to three healthy parts of self—a Nurturing Adult Self, a Protective Adult Self, and a Spiritual Core Self. These Resources are based on real experiences a patient has had of nurturing and protecting a loved one, and peak spiritual experiences—so that patients understand their Resources are real parts of self, not just imaginary helpers.

Next a series of steps are employed to identify a group of important maladaptive introjects connected by a common theme, such as rejection, abuse, or enmeshment. The steps include an Attachment Needs Ladders questionnaire, a Conference Room Protocol, and a Switching the Dominance Protocol.

Once identified, these introjects are then invited to connect with the Resources. A DNMS therapist will guide the Resources to meet their developmental needs, process through their painful emotions, and strengthen an emotional bond. According to the DNMS model, these interactions with Resource parts of self will help introjects heal. As they heal, patients report unwanted behaviors, beliefs, and emotions diminish.

== Research ==
Two DNMS case-study articles have been published in peer-reviewed journals. One is a case study about a patient with dissociative identity disorder. The other is eight case studies representing the work of three DNMS therapists. While these published case-studies tend to support the assertion that the DNMS is effective, they do not meet the criteria for empirical research. The DNMS has not yet been tested in controlled clinical trials and cannot be called an evidence-based therapy.

== See also ==
- Dissociation (psychology)
