= Paul Federn =

Austrian-American psychologist

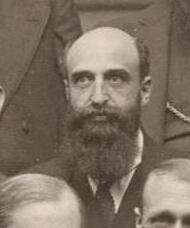
Paul Federn in 1911

Paul Federn (German: [ˈfeːdɐn]; October 13, 1871 – May 4, 1950) was an Austrian-American psychologist. Federn is largely remembered for his theories involving ego psychology and therapeutic treatment of psychosis.

== Life and career ==
Federn was born in Vienna into a distinguished Jewish family. His grandfather was a rabbi in Prague, and his father, Salomon Federn (1832–1920) was a distinguished Viennese physician.

After earning his doctorate in 1895, he was an assistant in general medicine under Hermann Nothnagel (1841–1905) in Vienna. It was Nothnagel who introduced Federn to the works of Sigmund Freud. Federn was deeply influenced by Freud's Interpretation of Dreams, and in 1904 became devoted to the field of psychoanalysis. Along with Alfred Adler and Wilhelm Stekel, Federn was an important early follower of Freud. In 1924 he became an official representative of Freud, as well as vice president of the Vienna Psychoanalytic Society.

In 1938 Federn emigrated to the United States and settled in New York City, however it wouldn't be until 1946 that he would be officially recognized as a training analyst at the New York Psychoanalytic Institute. In 1950, Paul Federn committed suicide in New York City following a recurrence of what he believed was incurable cancer.

== Writings ==
In the late 1920s, Federn published important books such as "Some Variations in Ego-Feeling" and "Narcissism in the Structure of the Ego". In his works he elucidated upon the concepts of "ego states", "ego limits", "ego cathexis" and the median nature of narcissism. Although an ardent supporter of Freud's teachings, Federn's concept of the ego as experience coinciding with "ego feeling" was inconsistent with Freud's structural approach. Out of loyalty to his mentor, Federn had a tendency to downplay his own theories, even though the conclusions he reached were far different from Freud's.

Federn advocated an unorthodox approach concerning analysis of psychosis. He believed that a patients' attempt at integration should involve strengthening his defenses, while at the same time avoiding repressed material. He also believed that transference involving psychosis should not be analyzed, and that negative transference should be avoided. With regard to schizophrenic patients, he believed that their egos possessed insufficient cathectic energy, and that it was a lack rather than an excess of narcissistic libido that caused a psychotic individuals' difficulties with the object. He also introduced the term mortido to represent Freud's death drive.

Federn was also interested in social psychology. In a 1919 work titled "Zur Psychologie der Revolution: die Vaterlose Gesellschaft", he explains the challenge to authority by the post-World War I generation as unconscious parricide whose goal is to create a "fatherless society".

== Influence ==
Although Federn's psychoanalytical theories had limited influence within the movement, he had several important followers in Europe and America.

- Eric Berne, an analysand of Federn, derived his concept of ego states in transactional analysis from his mentor, as well as crediting him with the re-introduction of introspection into psychoanalysis.
- John G. Watkins also built on Federn's work for his ego-state therapy.
- Edoardo Weiss, a student of Federn's and tasked with the duty of putting together Federn's final manuscript, Ego Psychology and the Psychoses after the death of Federn postulates this Federn assumption:

"As long as the ego functions normally, one may ignore, or be unaware of its functioning. As Federn says, normally there is no more awareness of the ego than of the air one breathes; only when respiration becomes burdensome is the lack of air recognized. The ego feeling is the feeling of unity, in continuity, contiguity and causality, in the experiences of the individual. In waking life the sensation of one's ego is omnipresent, but it undergoes continuous changes in quality and intensity. Slight disturbances and variations of ego feeling are a matter of common experience and subside unnoticed. When we are tired or drowsy, we feel numb; upon waking from a refreshing sleep, or upon receiving exciting news, we sense an invigorated ego feeling."
