= Ego-state therapy =

Parts-based psychodynamic approach

Ego state therapy is a parts-based psychodynamic approach to treat various behavioural and cognitive problems within a person. It uses techniques that are common in group and family therapy, but with an individual patient, to resolve conflicts that manifest in a "family of self" within a single individual.

== History ==
The concept of segmentation of personality has been around for many years, and that of ego states was highlighted by the psychoanalyst Paul Federn. The creation of ego-state therapy is attributed to John G. Watkins, an analysand of Edoardo Weiss who was himself analysed by Federn. The first research on the efficacy of Ego state therapy was conducted by Gordon Emmerson. Emmerson conducted his research during a sabbatical from Victoria University. In this research he showed that the therapy could reduce menstrual migraines 5-fold in just 4 weekly sessions. It further indicated that Ego state therapy could not only reduce the occurrence to menstrual migraine, but participants also showed a significant reduction in both Anger and Depression on the MMPI-2. This quasi-experimental study was the only causal study included in the Watkins, book, Ego States: Theory and Therapy.

== Ego states ==
Distinct ego states—in the most rigorous sense—do not normally develop except in cases of dissociative identity disorder. However, Ego state therapy identifies and names facets of a patient's personality, e.g., the "frightened child" or "control freak". After the characteristics and function of each ego state are identified, the therapist uses various psychotherapeutic techniques (e.g. behavioral, cognitive, analytic, or humanistic therapies) to achieve a kind of integration or internal diplomacy. Ego state therapy may use hypnosis, but is not necessarily required to do so, employing conversational technique instead.

== Psychological process ==
In the development of the human personality, there are two processes that are essential: integration and differentiation. Through integration a person learns to put concepts together, like a shirt and a pair of trousers, to build more complex units known as clothes. By differentiation the person separates general concepts into specific meaning, such as the differences between a comfortable shirt and an uncomfortable shirt. Such differentiation allows humans to experience one set of behaviours in a different situation to another.

Psychological processes do not exist on an either/or basis. Things such as moods and emotions like depression, anxiety, and fear exist on a continuum with differing degrees of intensity. It is the same with differentiation-dissociation. Disorders such as dissociative identity disorder are often in the extreme end of the continuum that begins with normal differentiation. It is a matter of intensity. Therefore, the general principle of personality formation in which the process of separation has resulted in discrete segments, called ego states, with boundaries that are more or less permeable. Where however an ego state is a response to psychological trauma, it may remain completely walled-off from the rest of the personality.

Ego states exist as a collection of perceptions, cognitions and affects in organised clusters. An ego state may be defined as an organized system of behavior and experience, whose elements are bound together by common principle. When one of these states is invested with ego energy, it becomes "the self" in the here and now. This state is executive, and experiences the other states which are then invested with object energy.

Ego states vary in their volume. A large ego state may include all the various behaviors activated in one's occupation. A small ego state are the behaviours one experiences in a simple action, such as using a mobile phone. They may represent current modes of behavior and experiences or, as with hypnotic age regression, include many memories, postures, feelings, etc. that were apparently learned at an earlier age. They may be organised into different dimensions. For example, an ego state may be built around the age of 10. Another one may represent patterns of behavior toward a father or authority figures and thus overlap with experiences from the age of 10. Behaviors to accomplish a similar goal may be uniquely different from one ego state to another, especially in true multiple personalities.

== See also ==
- Coherence therapy
- Developmental needs meeting strategy
- Transactional analysis § The ego-state, or Parent–Adult–Child (PAC), models
- Inner child
- Inner critic
- Internal Family Systems Model
- Resource Therapy Model
- Schema therapy § Schema modes
- Subpersonality
