= Adult child =

Adult child may refer to:

- An offspring that has reached the age of majority
- Vulnerable adult, an adult who is unable to care for themselves
- Kidult, a term referring to an adult with childlike interests

== Music ==
- Adult/Child, an unreleased album by the Beach Boys

== Film ==
- Adult Children, a 1961 Soviet comedy film

== Psychology ==
- Inner child, an adult's childlike aspect
- Paraphilic infantilism, a form of ageplay involving an adult role-playing a regression to an infant-like state

== See also ==
- Adult Children of Alcoholics
- Ageplay
- Peter Pan syndrome
- Manchild (disambiguation)
- Kidult (disambiguation)
