= Subpersonality =

Personality mode allowing a person to cope with psychosocial situations

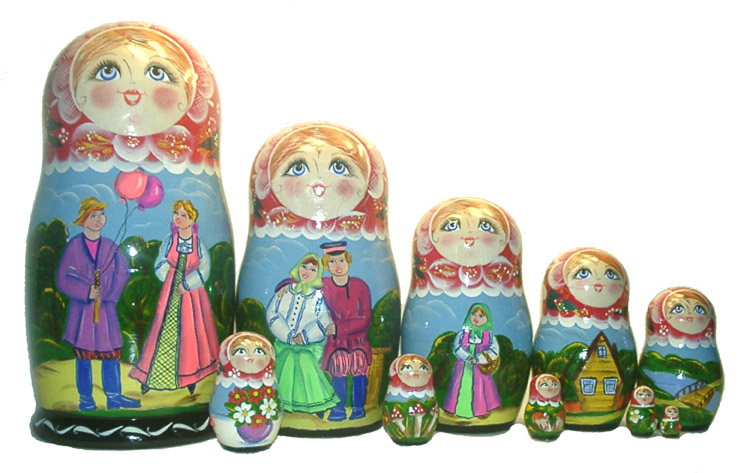
Stacking dolls provide a visual representation of subpersonalities.

A subpersonality is, in humanistic psychology, transpersonal psychology and ego psychology, a personality mode that activates (appears on a temporary basis) to allow a person to cope with certain types of psychosocial situations. Similar to a complex, the mode may include thoughts, feelings, actions, physiology and other elements of human behavior to self-present a particular mode that works to negate particular psychosocial situations. The British humanistic psychologist John Rowan suggested that the average person has about a dozen subpersonalities.

Many schools of psychotherapy see subpersonalities as relatively enduring psychological structures or entities that influence how a person feels, perceives, behaves, and sees themselves. John Rowan described it as a 'semipermanent and semi-autonomous region of the personality capable of acting as a person'.

== Similarity with possible selves ==
Subpersonalities are functionally similar to possible selves, a concept used in cognitive psychology.

Possible selves are defined as psychological schema that represent multiple versions of the self. These include past and future selves, which together characterise thoughts and feelings, such as remorse, satisfaction, and doubt about the person we may have been previously, as well as hopes and worries about who we may become.

== In psychotherapy ==
Facilitating the identification and exploration of subpersonalities or possible selves is a strategy by which therapists seek to promote positive cognitive, emotional, and behavioural change in psychotherapy.

Over the history of psychotherapy, many forms of therapy have worked with inner diversity generally, and representations or subpersonalities specifically.

Early methods include Jungian analysis, psychosynthesis, transactional analysis, and gestalt therapy. These were followed by some forms of hypnotherapy and the inner child work of John Bradshaw and others. Meanwhile, a number of psychotherapists have developed comprehensive techniques to support the active expression of subpersonalities and possible selves. These include British psychotherapist Paul Newham who pioneered the therapeutic use of expressive arts to explore subpersonalites through costume, mask, drama, and voice. A recent method is Internal Family Systems therapy (IFS therapy), developed by Richard C. Schwartz. He sees DID alters as on the same continuum as IFS parts (subpersonalities), the only difference being that alters are more polarized and split off from the rest of the internal system.

== Therapeutic outcomes ==
Some studies have shown that subpersonality integration in the psychosynthesis therapeutic setting can help clients enhance creativity, relieve anxiety, and rebuild their identities when dealing with culture shock. A psychology of religion study found it helped awaken personal and spiritual growth in self-identified atheists.

== See also ==
- Future self – Research that examines the processes of thinking of oneself in the future
- Inner critic – Concept in psychology
- Personification – Representation of a thing or abstraction as a person
- Schema modes – Form of integrative psychotherapy
