= Lucia Capacchione =

American psychologist and author (1937–2022)

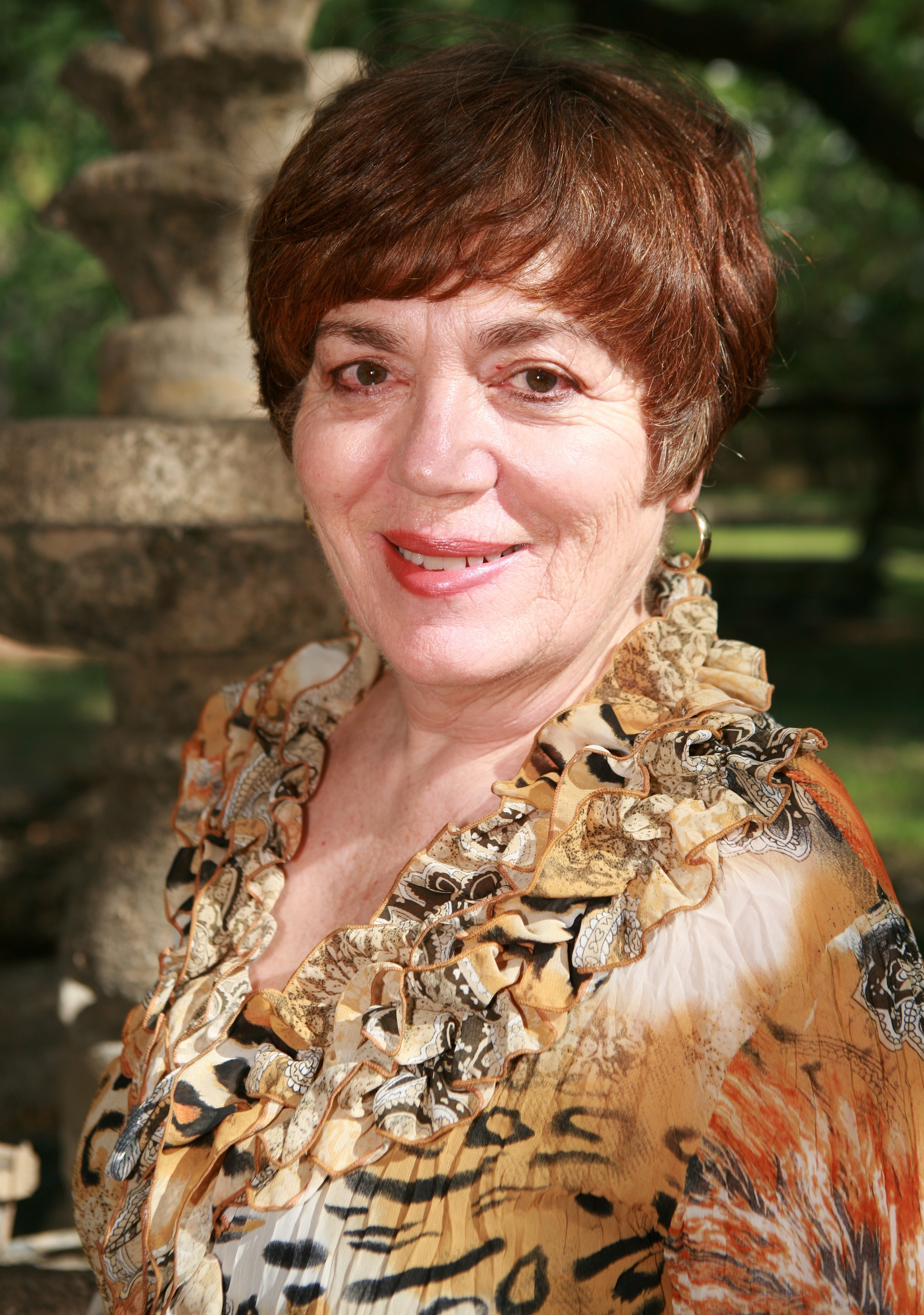
- Dr. Lucia Capacchione
- Born: November 3, 1937; West Hollywood, California
- Died: November 28, 2022 (aged 85); Cambria, California, U.S.
- Education: St. Mary's Academy; Immaculate Heart High School; Immaculate Heart College (BA); Goddard College (MA); Summit University of Louisiana (PhD)
- Occupations: Psychologist; Art Therapy; Art Therapist; Author; Pioneer: Creative Journal Expressive Arts Therapeutic Methods
- Years active: 1961–2022
- Known for: Inner-child work, journal therapy, art therapy, Creative Journal Expressive Arts
- Notable work: Recovery of Your Inner Child (1991); "Visioning: Ten Steps to Designing the Life of Your Dreams" (2000)
- Spouse: Peter Jon Pearce (1960–1971)
- Website: www.luciac.org

Lucia Capacchione (formerly Lucia Pearce) (3 November 1937 – 28 November 2022) was an Italian-American psychologist, art therapist, artist, graphic designer and author who has been bestseller of twenty-two books based on child therapy and self-help, including The Creative Journal (1979) and Recovery of Your Inner Child (1991). She discovered the use of 'writing and drawing with the non-dominant hand' method in art therapy, which she first mentioned it in her work The Power of Your Other Hand (1988). She was the director of Head Start program during the period of President Johnson's War on Poverty. A long-time member of American Art Therapy Association and International Expressive Arts Therapy Association, she was also a consultant to Walt Disney Imagineering from 1983 till 1993.

In 2024 the Dr. Lucia Capacchione Institute Inc. was formed to celebrate and share the legacy of the late Dr. Capacchione, artist, designer, author, healer, clinician, pioneer and creator of the Creative Journal Expressive Arts suite of therapeutic methods:

- Creative Journal Method (1976)
- Inner Child Reparenting Method (1976)
- Whole-Brain Two-Handed Method (1976)
- Body-Mind Healing-Arts Method (1980)
- Visioning Method (1994)

== Early life ==
Dr. Capacchione was born in Los Angeles to a Roman Catholic Italian immigrant family on November 3, 1937, in West Hollywood, California, United States. Her father and grandparents hailed from San Ferdinando di Puglia, Apulia, Italy who moved to Los Angeles County somewhere between 1908 and 1920. She spent her preschool days in New Chinatown before moving to Crenshaw where she attended Roman Catholic convents schools such as St. Paul's Grammar School and St. Mary's Academy. She was exposed to major talent of the time attending live opera, concerts. musicals and plays at the L.A. Philharmonic and Baltimore Theater. In 1950, at the age of 13, she began Saturday classes at the Otis Art Institute in the Harrison Gray Otis mansion in Los Angeles. She graduated from Immaculate Heart High School in 1955, with classmate Mary Tyler Moore. She married Peter Jon Pearce in 1960 and had two daughters with him, Aleta Pearce and Celia Pearce.

== Education ==
According to her Facebook profile, after completing her studies from Immaculate Heart High School in 1955, she pursued bachelors in fine arts and English literature from now-defunct Immaculate Heart College in Los Angeles, graduating in 1959. She further pursued masters in psychology and art therapy from Goddard College in Plainfield, graduating in 1975. She holds a PhD degree in psychology from Summit University of Louisiana in New Orleans, graduating in 1990.

== Career ==
Capacchione started-off her internship as a trainer in various programs of American Montessori Society in the 1960s. She was later appointed as a Child Development Supervisor for Catholic Charities (an affiliate of Roman Catholic Archdiocese of Los Angeles) in December 1965 and even got certified through Dr. Thomas Gordon's Parent Effectiveness Training and Teacher Effectiveness Training. She resigned from the Archdiocese in 1967 but remained a consultant to both of the organizations' programs in Pasadena and New Jersey. She also produced two documentaries while being the director of Head Start program, Learning to Learn and I Wanna Be Ready.

In 1973, Lucia fell mysteriously ill and was misdiagnosed by doctors several times. As a result, she suffered with the side-effects of wrong medications. She then started expressing her emotions and thoughts in sketchbooks and saw them morph into journals. She mentioned this new self discovered healing method of the inner-child in many of her works, such as The Creative Journal (1979). In 1976, she discovered the use of 'writing and drawing with the non-dominant hand' method, which she first mentioned it in her work The Power of Your Other Hand (1988) and also a method of reparenting which she documented in her book Recovery of Your Inner Child (1991). She was a consultant to Walt Disney Imagineering for ten years from 1983 till 1993 where she worked with designers and builders on various Disney theme parks and stores.

== Bibliography ==
- The Creative Journal: The Art of Finding Yourself, 1979
- The Power of Your Other Hand: A Course in Channeling the Inner Wisdom of the Right Brain, 1988
- The Creative Journal for Children: A Guide for Parents, Teachers, and Counselors, 1989
- The Well Being Journal: Drawing upon Your Inner Power to Heal Yourself, 1989
- Lighten Up Your Body, Lighten Up Your Life: Beyond Diet and Exercise, 1990
- The Picture of Health: Healing Your Life through Art, 1990
- Recovery of Your Inner Child: The Highly Acclaimed Method for Liberating Your Inner Self, 1991
- The Creative Journal for Teens: Making Friends with Yourself, 1992
- Creating a Joyful Birth Experience (with Sandra Bardsley), 1994
- Putting Your Talent to Work: Identifying, Cultivating, and Marketing Your Natural Talents, 1996
- Creative Journal for Parents: A Guide to Unlocking Your Natural Parenting Wisdom, 2000
- Visioning: Ten Steps to Designing the Life of Your Dreams, 2000
- Living with Feeling: The Art of Emotional Expression, 2001
- The Art of Emotional Healing, 2006
- Hello, This Is Your Body Talking: A Draw-It-Yourself Coloring Book, 2017
