= Edoardo Weiss =

Italian psychoanalyst

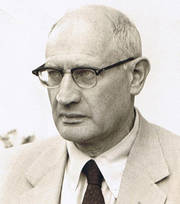

Edoardo Weiss (September 21, 1889, Trieste – December 14, 1970, Chicago) was an Italian psychoanalyst of Jewish origin, and a survivor of the Holocaust as a refugee in the United States. He was a student of Sigmund Freud and of his follower Paul Federn. He was the earliest Italian psychoanalyst, and the founder of psychoanalysis in Italy. His most important theoretical contributions were perhaps to the development of ego state theory.

Weiss's first article, on the psychodynamics of asthma attacks, was published in 1922, and was followed over the next two decades by seven more, on subjects ranging from acting out to the fear of blushing. In 1950 he published his general survey, Principles of Psychoanalysis; in 1964 he published Agoraphobia in the light of ego psychology; and in 1970 he published the semi-autobiographical Sigmund Freud as a Consultant.

Weiss introduced the concept of destrudo into psychoanalysis, as well as that of psychic presence: the mental awareness of the internalised image of another ego, often parental, in oneself. From this and other studies in ego states stemmed his major influence on such later figures as Eric Berne and John G. Watkins.

== Life ==
Edoardo Weiss was born in Trieste on September 21, 1889 to Jewish parents: his father Ignazio, of Bohemian origin, was the owner of an oil mill; his mother, Fortuna Iacchia, was of Sephardic lineage. As a young man, he moved to Vienna, the capital of the Austro-Hungarian Empire, to study medicine and in particular psychiatry. During his degree course, Weiss was fortunate enough to meet many illustrious professors, such as the Bavarian Theodor Escherich, discoverer of Escherichia coli, but also Professor Julius Wagner-Jauregg, the only Nobel Prize winner in psychiatry. In 1913, the year before his graduation, Weiss joined the Viennese Psychoanalytic Society, starting to practice his profession as a psychiatrist.

In 1917 he married Dr. Wanda Schrenger who would become the mother of his children and his lifelong companion.

=== The environments of his training ===
Psychiatry had not yet found fertile ground in Italy and Weiss, who had already been cultivating an interest in this field for some time, decided to leave Trieste and undertake his studies at the University of Vienna, following the example of many other Triestines who had studied at this university which was considered, at the end of the century, one of the best for the high standard of living which favoured cultural and scientific progress.

In 1914 he returned to Trieste, where he continued to practice his profession; in the meantime Trieste had become a communication centre between Europe and the rest of the world. In twenty years the population had increased by 40% and the municipality was in first place in the ranking of Austro-Hungarian cities for the ratio between the number of taxpayers and the total population. For Edoardo Weiss, one of the most lively places was the Caffè San Marco which, as described by the writer Claudio Magris, became the "meeting place for irredentist youth and a laboratory for false passports for anti-Austrian patriots who wanted to escape to Italy". The Caffè allowed Edoardo to meet prominent figures such as the well-known mathematician Guido Voghera, the philosopher Giorgio Fano and illustrious artists such as Vittorio Bolaffio, Ruggero Rovan and Italo Svevo.

=== Medical career ===
At the outbreak of the Great War, Weiss was called upon to serve as a military doctor in the Austro-Hungarian army. It is certain that the psychiatrist had a great love for Italy, a feeling that was shared by the entire bourgeoisie of that time: an anecdote tells that Weiss was assigned to the Polish contingent and later accused of having shown excessive clemency towards the Italian soldiers taken prisoner, for which reason he was transferred to Croatian soil. At the end of the war, Edoardo found work as a psychiatrist in the male ward of the Civic Rehabilitation Center "Andrea di Sergio Galatti" in Trieste, where he practiced for 10 years. He left many clinical records with relative anamnestic notes from which his great dedication to the care of the patient can be seen, accompanied by a precise descriptive ability of the symptoms.

In his friendships he tried, in vain, to keep his professional life separate from his private life: the Cafés, in fact, were transformed into collection centers for dream interpretation. In 1931 he then decided to move to Rome.

Weiss's interest in psychoanalysis led to him visiting the Vienna Psychoanalytic Society in 1908; he would subsequently be analysed by a leading member of that group, Paul Federn, with whom he established a lifelong collaboration. Working as an analyst in Trieste, Weiss analysed such literary figures as Umberto Saba; in the thirties he even consulted Freud about the propriety of himself providing a training analysis for his own son, and he regularly referred difficult cases to Freud for consultation.

After the Anschluss of 1938, Weiss emigrated to America, to work first at the Menninger Clinic, and then with Franz Alexander in Chicago. He oversaw the publication of Federn's posthumous writings in 1953.

== See also ==
- Italo Svevo
- Kurt R. Eissler
- Mortido
