= Ira Hyman =

Professor of psychology, mostly focused on human memory

- Citizenship: United States
- Education: Florida State University, (MA Cognitive psychology and Developmental psychology; PhD 1990)
- Alma mater: Duke University; Emory University
- Known for: false childhood memories, autobiographical memory, Traumatic memories, inattentional blindness ("Did you see the unicycling clown?")
- Scientific career
- Fields: Psychology, Cognitive Psychology
- Workplaces: Western Washington University

Ira Hyman is an American psychologist who is a professor of psychology at Western Washington University in Bellingham, Washington. His research is focused on human memory including traumatic memories, false childhood memories, autobiographical memory, memory in social context, and memory for phobia onset. Some of his most influential studies are: "Did you see the unicycling clown? Inattentional blindness while walking and talking on a cell phone", "Errors in autobiographical memories", "Individual differences and the creation of false childhood memories", "The role of mental imagery in the creation of false childhood memories" and "False memories of childhood experiences".

== Education ==
He next attended Florida State University where he graduated with a Master of Arts in Cognitive and Developmental Psychology in 1989, and acquired his Ph.D. in the same subject in 1990. Following graduation Hyman began working as a Research Assistant Professor for The Institute for the Learning Sciences at Northwestern University, and released his first publication: "Memorabeatlia: A naturalistic study of long-term memory" with his colleague D.C Rubin, about the memory and recollection of well-known song lyrics. Between 1991 and 1995 Hyman was an assistant professor at the Psychology Department in the Western Washington University and began his publications in earnest, including his first solo publication, "Multiple approaches to remembering: Comment on Edwards, Middleton, and Potter". This was also the time period during which Hyman first collaborated with Ulric Neisser. Between 1995 and 2000 Hyman worked as an associate professor at Western Washington University, and became a professor in 2000. He published articles in thirteen journals and has contributed chapters to nine books. He also co-edited the book "Memory Observed: Remembering in Natural Contexts" with Ulric Neisser in 2000.

=== False memory stories ===
In a 1990 study with Troy H. Husband and F. James Billings, Hyman found that when given misleading information, college-students will create a fictitious memory of their childhood. In this study, called "False Memories of Childhood Experiences" Hyman and his colleagues sent questionnaires to the parents of psychology students, asking them to describe meaningful events in their children's life, such as getting lost, losing a pet, or taking a family vacation. The child (now a college-student) was then asked to recall several of the 'real' events as recorded by their parent, and also a 'false' event, created by the researchers as a misleading guide, in two separate interviews. It was found that while none of the participants incorporated the false information into their memories in the initial interview, in the follow-up interview 20% of the participants had created a false memory using the misleading information. A second related experiment revealed, that regardless what age the experimenters claimed the false event happened at (ages 2, 6 or 10) participants created false memories at the same rate. This experiment shown that as long as some relevant background material is present, under peer pressure people are likely to create false childhood memories. These results have significant implication in therapy situations, in which one is attempting to recover childhood memories, which may instead lead to creation of false memories.

=== False memory and personality ===
Hyman then conducted a similar study three years later, in 1998, to distinguish if there were certain personality types that were more likely to create false childhood memories. In this "Individual Differences and the Creation of False Childhood Memories" study, Hyman and his partner Billings once again sent questionnaires to the parents of psychology students asking them to describe significant life events. The student was then presented with several true memories and one researcher-created false memory. In addition, students were given four Cognitive/Personality Scale tests. These scales were used to test the students' suggestibility (Dissociative Experiences Scale), ability to create mental images from memory (Creative Imagination Scale), commitment to memory (Tellegan Absorption Scale) and desire for social acceptance (Social Desirability Scale). It was found that the more one uses mental imagery and the more suggestible they are, the more likely they are to form a false memory. Commitment to memory and social acceptance do not affect false memories. This study also found that the more students talked about the false event during the interviews, the more likely they were to create a false memories. This study is also important because it indicates that the findings of the first study are generalizable to a wider population as well as showing that people with certain personality types are more susceptible to the creation of false memories in psychotherapy, where similar techniques are regularly used.

== Traumatic memories ==
Hyman is also interested in the effect of trauma on memory, specifically the negative experiences of childhood on memory.

=== Memories of traumatic vs. positive events ===
In 2001 he conducted a study with Christina A. Bryne and Kaia L. Scott on "Comparisons of Memories for Traumatic Events and Other Experiences". In this study undergraduate college women were questioned using the Traumatic Stress Survey to identify a potentially traumatic event in their lives, such as child abuse, experiencing a natural disaster or other types of victimization. Students were then questioned further about their 'worst' traumatic event, a different negative event and a positive event. Students were asked to rate the quality of each of their three memories on a scale from 1-7 for vividness, emotionality and importance, surrounding events, order of events within the memory and their confidence as to the accuracy of the memory. Students were then assessed with a post-traumatic stress disorder scale, the Beck Depression Inventory, the Brief Symptom Inventory (used to determine current distress levels) and the Dissociative Experiences Scale. It was found that contrary to many flashbulb memory hypotheses, traumatic experiences are less clearly recalled than positive experiences. Positive memories contained more sensory detail, and clarity of events surrounding the memory were also better for positive memories, despite the fact that the negative and traumatic memories were more likely to be rated as important. In general, participants reported talking about traumatic events less often than positive events, but this had no real effect on recall, nor did the emotionality of the respective events. Thus these findings support the view of a more limited memory for traumatic events and poor encoding for negative events overall.

=== Children's memories of traumatic and positive events ===
In a related study on "Children's Memory for Trauma and Positive Experiences" in 2003, similar trend was observed. In this study the nature of memory for trauma vs. standard autobiographical events was tested. Thirty children between age 8 and 16, who were being treated for traumatic experiences were asked to identify one positive event, that occurred around the same time as the traumatic event for which they were receiving treatment. They were not asked to describe either event in the course of the study, but they were then given a questionnaire about both events. Therapists were also asked to fill out a questionnaire about the characteristics of the children's memories. It was found that the trauma memories had less detail and coherence than the positive memories, but more meaning. Emotionality had no effect. This suggests that along with a failure to encode, poor memory for traumatic events could be due to a reluctance to retrieve unpleasant memories, but overall there is very little difference between memories for positive vs traumatic events.

== Memory in social contexts ==
Hyman has done several studies researching the effects of social context on memory, including a study on the effect of humor on memory where it was found that pun humor increased recognition and recall memory due to the poignancy of the pun and the necessarily small amount of important 'to-be-remembered' information that it contains. A related study showed that when participants in an experiment remembered a story in the context of a conversation with a peer they made more personal connections and offered more memory support than when speaking with an experimenter. Both of these findings are important because they are widely applicable in many fields, and can be of general use to related areas such as education to help improve retention techniques amongst students.

=== Did You See the Unicycling Clown? ===
In 2009, Ira Hyman conducted one of his most widely cited studies along with S. Matthew Boss, Breanne M. Wise, Kira E. McKenzie and Jenna M. Coggiano. The article was called "Did you see the Unicycling Clown? Inattentional Blindness while Walking and Talking on a Cell Phone." The researchers had a clown unicycle around a plaza on a college campus, and observed the students walking through the plaza. They interviewed students after they had been exposed to the clown, and found that only a quarter of those using a cell phone saw the clown. They compared this to three other groups: those walking alone, those listening to music, and those walking in a pair or group. They found that it wasn't the use of an electronic device that impaired the students attention, because more than twice as many students saw the clown while listening to music, than while on the phone. They concluded that it is using a cell phone, and having to divide attention between the conversation and the surroundings, what makes people less likely to notice the clown. They observed that many of the students using their cells walked slower, changed directions more often and weaved more than other students. They also noted that individuals walking in pairs were more likely to notice the clown, simply because they could also rely on their companion to pay attention, and that it is unlikely that the conversation itself was the reason why the cellphones users were less attentive to their surroundings. This research offers an important finding in what dictates our attention, and shows just how unaware of many things around us we are at any given time. It also shows the dangers of cellphone distraction, that can be applied to areas other than just walking, such as working machinery or attempting to drive while talking on a cell phone. A recreation of this study was featured on the CBC Documentary "Are We Digital Dummies" and on News10 in Sacramento, California.

== Autobiographical memory ==
Hyman has also done extensive research on Autobiographical Memory, examining memories of events that happened to a person. This research is related to his studies of False Childhood Memories, since some autobiographical memories can also be incorrect as demonstrated in his 1998 study of Known vs. Remembered events.

=== Autobiographical memory in Alzheimer's patients ===
In 1998 Hyman and his co-authors, P. Usita and K. Herman conducted a study on the effects of progressive Alzheimer's disease on the ability to recall life events. They listened to personal narratives from six people with the disease and six without and recorded the various memory failures, repetitions and organizational methods of each group. They found that those with Alzheimer's Disease had a marked deficiency in their ability to adequately recall past significant events. They were less organized in their storytelling and were also far less detailed than those without the disease. However, all members of the experiment were able to complete the survey with enough time and prompting. This is an important finding because sharing life stories is an important interpersonal skill and crucial to social engagement. This study is important because it shows the longevity of autobiographical memory even when there are global memory failures in other ways and gives an idea of how psychology's results can be used to enrich the lives of the elderly and ill.

=== Laboratory, and real life application of memory ===
Hyman was also interested in the transference of laboratory methods of testing autobiographical information to real life situations, and in 1998 Ira Hyman along with Carol Wilkinson published an article that looked at how memory had been tested in psychology laboratories. They hypothesized that the methods psychology researcher were using, mainly word lists, did not explain how normal autobiographical memory worked, and the results gathered using this type of research may not generalize to real world situations. They found that errors made in autobiographical memories did not relate to the complexity of an additional task, that called for the participant to remember word lists. No matter how many words the participant was asked to remember, it had no effect on how well they remembered autobiographical memory. Thus, this finding shows evidence that autobiographical memory cannot be tested in the traditional lab setting.

== Publications ==
=== Books and book chapters ===
- Neisser, U., & Hyman, I. E. Jr. (Eds.) (2000), Memory Observed: Remembering in Natural Contexts (2nd Edition). NY: Worth.
- Hyman, I. E. Jr., & Loftus, E. F. (2002). False childhood memories and eyewitness memory errors. In M. L. Eisen, J. A. Quas, & G. S. Goodman (Eds.) Memory and suggestibility in the forensic interview (pp. 63–84). Mahwah, NJ: Erlbaum.
- Oakes, M. A., & Hyman, I. E. Jr. (2001). The role of the self in false memory creation. In J. J. Freyd & A. P. DePrince (Eds.) Trauma and cognitive science: A meeting of minds, science, and human experience (pp. 87–103). NY: Haworth Press.
- Hyman, I. E. Jr. (2000). The memory wars. In U. Neisser & I. E. Hyman Jr. (Eds.), Memory Observed: Remembering in Natural Contexts (2nd Edition) (pp. 374–379). NY: Worth.
- Oakes, M. A., & Hyman, I. E. Jr. (2000). The changing face of memory and self. In D. F. Bjorklund (Ed.), Research and theory in false-memory creation in children and adults (pp 45–67). Mahwah, NJ: Erlbaum.
- Hyman, I. E. Jr. (1999). Creating false autobiographical memories: Why people believe their memory errors. In E. Winograd, R. Fivush, & W. Hirst (Eds.), Ecological approaches to cognition: Essays in honor of Ulric Neisser (pp. 229–252). Hillsdale, NJ: Erlbaum.
- Hyman, I. E. Jr., & Kleinknecht, E. (1999). False childhood memories: Research, theory, and applications. In L. M. Williams & V. L. Banyard (Eds.) Trauma and memory (pp. 175–188). Thousand Oaks, CA: Sage.
- Schooler, J., & Hyman, I. E. Jr. (1997). Investigating alternative accounts of veridical and non-veridical memories of trauma: Report of the Cognitive Working Groups. In D. Read & S. Lindsay (Eds.), Recollections of trauma: Scientific research and clinical practice (pp. 531–540). New York: Plenum.
- Hyman, I. E. Jr., & Loftus, E. F. (1997). Some people recover memories of childhood trauma that never really happened. In P. Appelbaum, L. Uyehara, & M. Elin (Eds.), Trauma and memory: Clinical and legal controversies (pp. 3–24). Oxford University Press.
- Hyman, I. E. Jr. (1993). Imagery, reconstructive memory, and discovery. In B. Roskos-Ewoldsen, M. J. Intons-Peterson, & R. E. Anderson (Eds.), Imagery, creativity, and discovery: A cognitive perspective (pp. 99–121). The Netherlands: Elsevier Science Publishers.
- Hyman, I. E. Jr., & Faries, J. M. (1992). The functions of autobiographical memories. In M. A. Conway, D. C. Rubin, H. Spinnler, & W. A. Wagenaar (Eds.), Theoretical perspectives on autobiographical memory (pp. 207–221). The Netherlands: Kulwer Academic Publishers.

=== Journal articles ===
- Summerfelt, H.; Lippman, L.; Hyman, I. E. Jr. (2010). "The Effect of Humor on Memory: Constrained by the Pun". The Journal of General Psychology. 137 (4): 376–394. doi:10.1080/00221309.2010.499398. PMID 21086859. S2CID 19259146.
- Hyman, I. E. Jr.; Boss, S. M.; Wise, B. M.; McKenzie, K. E.; Caggiano, J. M. (2010). "Did you see the unicycling clown? Inattentional blindness while walking and talking on a cell phone". Applied Cognitive Psychology. 24 (5): 597–607. doi:10.1002/acp.1638.
- Berliner, L.; Hyman, I. E. Jr.; Thomas, A.; Fitzgerald, M. (2003). "Children's memory for trauma and positive experiences". Journal of Traumatic Stress. 16 (3): 229–236. CiteSeerX 10.1.1.550.6654. doi:10.1023/a:1023787805970. PMID 12816334. S2CID 5660151.
- Weberling, L. C.; Crain-Thoreson, C.; Forgays, D. K.; Hyman, I. E. Jr. (2003). "The validation of a prenatal screening inventory for prenatal child abuse risk prediction". Child Welfare. 82 (3): 319–334. PMID 12769394.
- Byrne, C. A.; Hyman, I. E. Jr.; Scott, K. (2001). "Comparisons of memories for traumatic events and other experiences". Applied Cognitive Psychology. 15 (7): S119–S133. doi:10.1002/acp.837.
- Oakes, M.A.; Hyman, I.E. Jr. (June 2001). "The role of the self in false memory creation". Journal of Aggression, Maltreatment & Trauma. 4 (2): 87–103. doi:10.1300/J146v04n02_05. S2CID 143204912.
- Winningham, R. G.; Hyman, I. E. Jr.; Dinnel, D. L. (2000). "Flashbulb memories? The effects of when the initial memory report was obtained". Memory. 8 (4): 209–216. CiteSeerX 10.1.1.513.9867. doi:10.1080/096582100406775. PMID 10932791. S2CID 17279158.
- Kheriaty, E.; Kleinknecht, R. A.; Hyman, I. E.; Jr. (1999). "Recall and validation of phobia origins as a function of a structured interview versus the Phobia Origins Questionnaire". Behavior Modification. 23 (1): 61–78. doi:10.1177/0145445599231003. PMID 9926522. S2CID 38133061.
- Wilkinson, C. L.; Hyman, I. E. Jr. (1998). "Individual differences related to two types of memory errors: Word lists may not generalize to autobiographical memory". Applied Cognitive Psychology. 12 (7): S29–S46. doi:10.1002/(sici)1099-0720(199812)12:7<s29::aid-acp596>3.0.co;2-r.
- Kleinknecht, R. A.; Hyman, I. E. Jr. (1998). "Critical issues in memory for trauma: The intersection of clinical psychology and cognitive science". Clinical Psychology Review. 18 (8): 891–894. doi:10.1016/s0272-7358(98)00038-5. PMID 9885765.
- Hyman, I. E. Jr.; Loftus, E. F. (1998). "Errors in autobiographical memories". Clinical Psychology Review. 18 (8): 933–947. CiteSeerX 10.1.1.493.1190. doi:10.1016/s0272-7358(98)00041-5. PMID 9885768.
- Hyman, I. E. Jr.; Gilstrap, L. L.; Decker, K.; Wilkinson, C. (1998). "Manipulating remember and know judgments of autobiographical memories: An investigation of false memory creation". Applied Cognitive Psychology. 12 (4): 371–386. doi:10.1002/(sici)1099-0720(199808)12:4<371::aid-acp572>3.0.co;2-u.
- Usita, P. M.; Hyman, I. E. Jr.; Herman, K. C. (1998). "Narrative intentions: Listening to life stories in Alzheimer's Disease". Journal of Aging Studies. 12 (2): 185–197. doi:10.1016/s0890-4065(98)90014-7.
- Hyman, I. E. Jr.; Billings, F. J. (1998). "Individual differences and the creation of false childhood memories". Memory. 6 (1): 1–20. doi:10.1080/741941598. PMID 9640430.
- Hyman, I. E. Jr.; Pentland, J. (1996). "The role of mental imagery in the creation of false childhood memories". Journal of Memory and Language. 35 (2): 101–117. doi:10.1006/jmla.1996.0006.
- Hyman, I. E. Jr.; Husband, T. H.; Billings, F. J. (1995). "False memories of childhood experiences". Applied Cognitive Psychology. 9 (3): 181–197. doi:10.1002/acp.2350090302.
- Hyman, I. E. Jr. (1994). "Conversational remembering: Story recall with a peer vs. for an experimenter". Applied Cognitive Psychology. 8: 49–66. doi:10.1002/acp.2350080106.
- Hyman, I. E. Jr.; Neisser, U. (1992). "The role of the self in recollections of a seminar". Journal of Narrative and Life History. 2 (2): 81–103. doi:10.1075/jnlh.2.2.01rol.
- Hyman, I. E. Jr.; Rubin, D. C. (1990). "Memorabeatlia: A naturalistic study of long-term memory". Memory & Cognition. 18 (2): 205–214. doi:10.3758/bf03197096. hdl:10161/10162. PMID 2319962.

=== Other publications ===
- The International Society for Traumatic Stress Studies (1998). Childhood Trauma Remembered: A report on the current scientific knowledge base and its applications. Chief Editors: S. Roth & M. J. Friedman; Section Editors: D. Finkelhor, L. Williams, M. J. Friedman, L. Berliner, & S. L. Bloom; Contributors: V. L. Banyard, C. Courtois, D. Elliot, I. Hyman, D. Rubin, D. Schacter, J. W. Schooler, S. Southwick, C. Tracy, & B. A. van der Kolk.
- Hyman, I. E. Jr. (1992). "Multiple approaches to remembering: Comment on Edwards, Middleton, and Potter". The Psychologist. 15: 450–451.
- Hyman, I. E. Jr. & Neisser, U. (1991). Reconstruing mental images: Problems of method. Emory Cognition Project Report, 19, Emory University, Department of Psychology.
