= Caffè San Marco =

Historic café in Trieste, Italy

Coordinates: 45.6527°N 13.7807°E

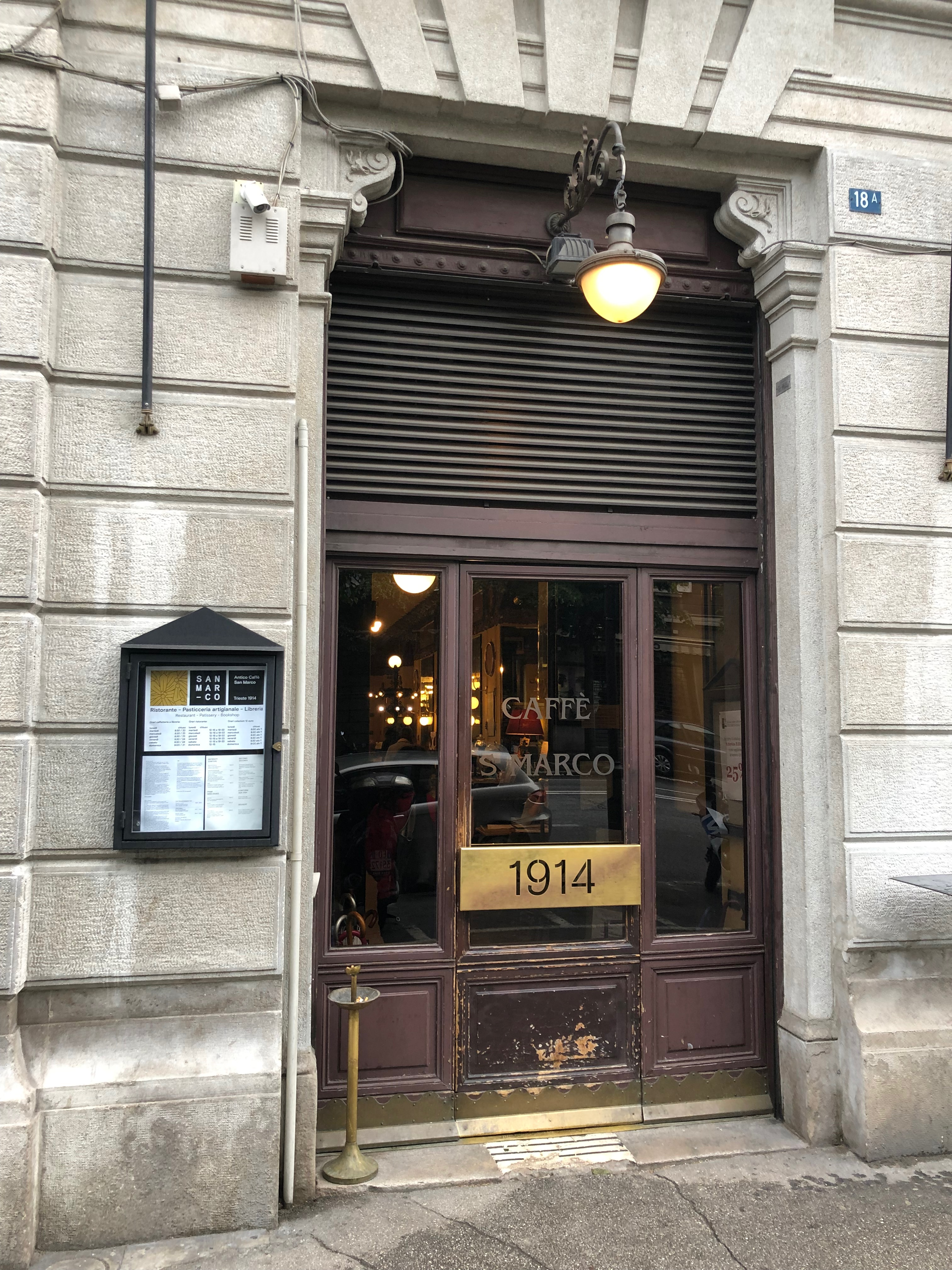
- Entrance to Caffè San Marco
- Interactive map of Caffè San Marco

Restaurant information
- Established: January 3, 1914; 112 years ago
- Previous owner: Marco Lovrinovich
- Food type: Italian café
- Location: Via Cesare Battisti 18, Trieste, Friuli Venezia Giulia, Italy
- Reservations: Yes
- Other information: Historic café (caffè storico d'Italia); includes a restaurant and bookshop

Caffè San Marco is a historic coffeehouse located at Via Cesare Battisti 18 in Trieste, Italy. Founded in 1914 by Marco Lovrinivich, it has long been associated with the city's intellectual life, Italian irredentism, and rich coffee culture. Known for its distinctive Viennese Secession-style interior and literary clientele—including James Joyce and Italo Svevo—the café has served as a gathering place for writers, students, and political thinkers. It remains a cultural destination in Trieste and was recognized as a historic café in Italy since 2005.

== History ==
Caffè San Marco was founded on 3 January 1914 by Marco Lovrinivich (Croatian: [Lovrinivić]), an entrepreneur native of Funtana near Poreč, Croatia, during a period when Trieste was part of the Austro-Hungarian Empire. The café was established on the ground floor of a newly constructed building owned by Assicurazioni Generali, which replaced a house at No. 18 via Stadion (now Via Cesare Battisti 18) and formerly hosted the Latteria Centrale Trifolium. Lovrinivich faced resistance from the Trieste Consortium of Café Proprietors, which unsuccessfully appealed to the Imperial-Royal Lieutenancy to block the opening.

The café quickly became a hub for politically active students and intellectuals, including Italian irredentists. Prominent literary figures such as James Joyce, Italo Svevo, and Umberto Saba frequented the café. It has also hosted Fulvio Tomizza, Scipio Slataper, Edoardo Weiss, Giorgio Voghera, and Claudio Magris. Magris has described it as "a place where you're at peace, you read, you write, you chat" and "a heart of the city; a strong heart that beats calmly".

On 23 May 1915, following Italy's declaration of war on Austria-Hungary during World War I, the café was vandalized and set on fire by anti-Italian groups. Firefighters were able to preserve much of its decorative interior. Lovrinivich himself was later imprisoned in the Austrian punitive barracks at Liebenau after self-infecting with trachoma in both eyes to avoid conscription against Italy. After World War I, the café flourished and became a prominent gathering place for the city's intellectual bourgeoisie and Jewish community. Over the decades, it has remained resilient in the face of political changes, economic crises, and changes in management.

The café was repeatedly restored, often with the support of Assicurazioni Generali. After reopening on 16 June 1997, it retained its evocative historic appearance. In 1962, scenes from the film Careless, based on Svevo's novel of the same name, were filmed at the café. Caffè San Marco is recognized as a caffè storico d'Italia (historic café of Italy) since 2005 and is widely regarded as a cultural institution in Trieste. It is a popular destination for both locals and tourists. Italians campaigned to save the historic café in 2013 and it has been restored. Trieste has long been associated with coffee culture and is often referred to as the "world capital of coffee". Cafés in the city remain central to public life, and Caffè San Marco is a leading example of this tradition. Trieste residents are noted for their high coffee consumption, averaging approximately 10 kilograms per person annually, twice the national Italian average. The city has one café for every 300 inhabitants, compared to one for every 450 elsewhere in Italy.

== Architecture ==
The architecture and interior design of Caffè San Marco reflect Viennese Secessionist style, featuring floral motifs and a warm color palette. The café includes stuccos and paintings by artists such as Giuseppe Barison, Vito Timmel, Napoleone Cozzi, Ugo Flumiani, and Guido Marussig. Decorative elements include wall medallions with nudes symbolizing regional rivers, leaves and coffee beans originally painted in the colors of the Italian flag and later gilded, carved wooden mascarons, and marble tables with cast iron legs on lion-paw pedestals. Carved wooden mascarons still gaze from above the bar, a work attributed to the Cante carpentry workshop. Some masks are believed to be by Viennese painter Vito Timmel, who frequented the café during his troubled life. Bronze coffee leaves adorn the ceiling. The atmosphere combines the aromas of roasted coffee and books, as the space also functions as a bookstore. Outside, wrought-iron tables face the nearby Synagogue and various architectural styles.

== Gallery ==
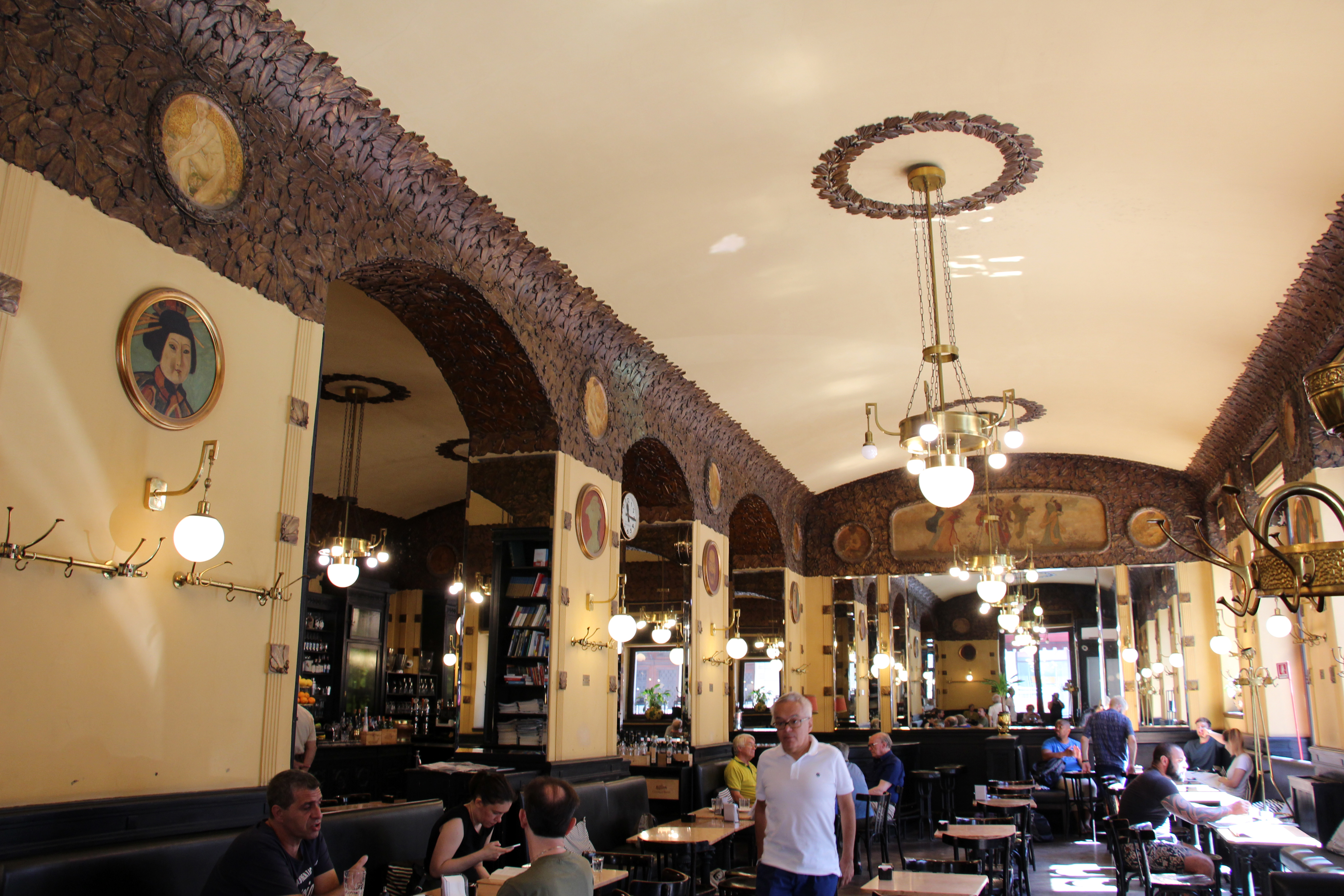
Interior of the cafe

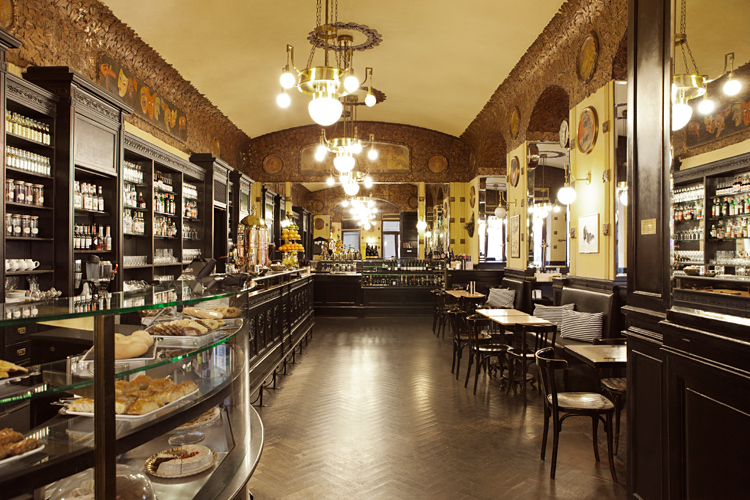
Interior of the cafe

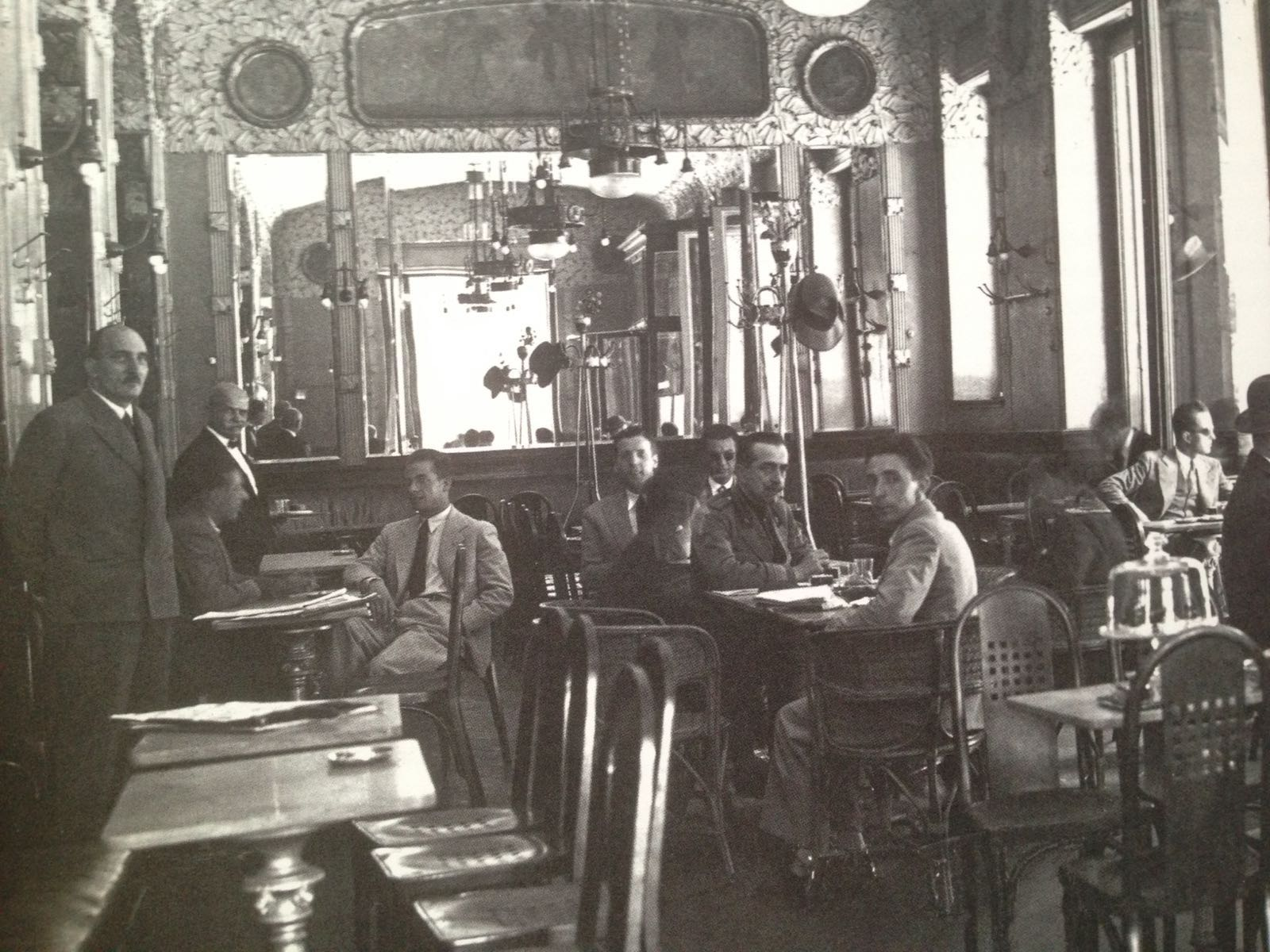
Cafe in early 20th century

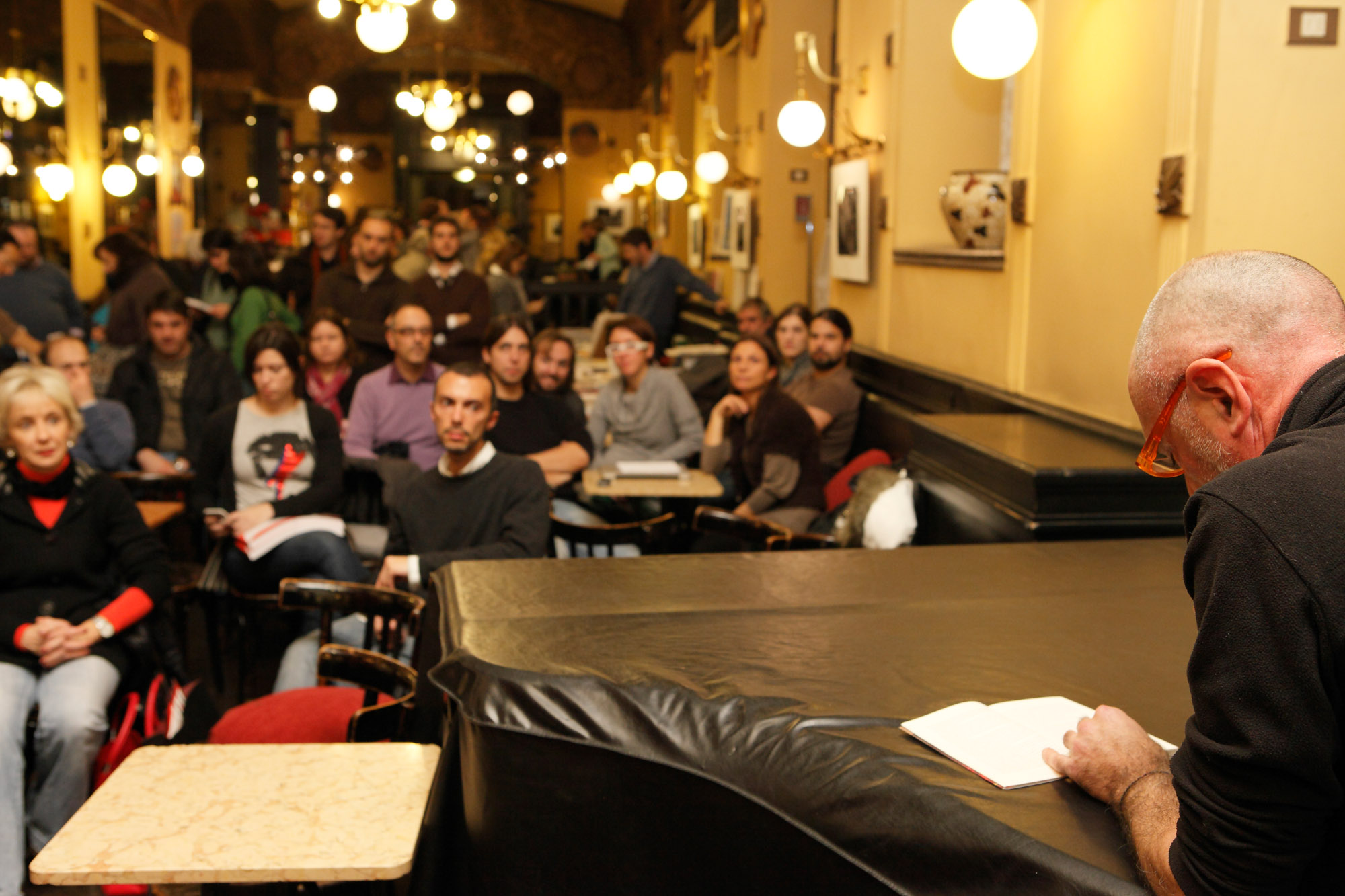
Bobi Balzen Publishing Fair 2011
