= Alsana =

Eating disorder treatment center

- Formation: 2002
- Founder: Mark Schwartz, Lori Galperin
- Headquarters: Thousand Oaks, California
- CEO: Jordan Watson
- Chief Clinical Officer: Keesha Amezcua, LMFT, CEDS-C
- Chief Medical Officer: Dr. Jay Joglekar, MD
- Website: https://www.alsana.com/

Alsana (formerly Castlewood Treatment Center) is an American eating disorder treatment provider that provides outpatient, inpatient, and residential programs. They offer care virtually, as well as in-person at their four locations in California and two in Alabama. They shut down their Missouri locations in 2024, following numerous lawsuits and changes to regulations.

Castlewood Treatment Center was founded by husband and wife Mark Schwartz and Lori Galperin in 2002. In 2008 Trinity Hunt Partners, a private equity firm based in Dallas, purchased Castlewood for $25 million. Trinity Hunt Partners then sold it to Riverside Co., a New York based private equity firm, in 2016.

The name was changed to Alsana in 2018, following a number of accusations and complaints. As part of the name change, they removed all references to Castlewood from their marketing materials.

Treatment at Castlewood incorporated Internal Family Systems therapy, and IFS founder Richard C. Schwartz worked at the facility as a consultant and staff trainer.

== Locations ==
As of October, 2025, Alsana has six locations: two in Birmingham, Alabama; Monterey, California; Santa Barbara, California; Thousand Oaks, California; and Westlake Village, California.

=== Former Locations ===
Castlewood/Alsana previously had locations in St. Louis County, Missouri; Franklin County, Missouri; and St. Louis, Missouri.

== Recovered memory therapy and lawsuits ==
Castlewood has been the target of multiple lawsuits. In 2011, a Minnesota woman sued Castlewood Treatment Center (now Alsana) and founder and clinical director at the time Mark Schwartz for claims of brainwashing. The woman, in her suit, claimed that while in her 15-month stay at Castlewood, Schwartz implanted false memories in her mind while she was hypnotized, leading her to believe that she was sexually abused, and had been in a satanic cult. By the end of 2012, three more women filed suit, making similar claims about memory recovery; one of the women alleged in her suit that through recovered-memory therapy at Castlewood she had come to believe she "had witnessed sacrificial murders", which she said was not true. In the end, five women sued with similar claims; in the fallout, Castlewood founder Mark Schwartz left the company in 2013 and, together with the Missouri state Board of Psychology, came to a disciplinary agreement wherein he "agreed to let his Missouri license expire." The suits were later dismissed, with the plaintiff's attorneys stating that the cases "resolved favorably for both sides."

=== Castlewood Victims Unite ===
In November 2012, the father and step-mother of a former Castlewood patient started a support group for patients and family members of patients who have suffered from attempting to receive treatment from Castlewood (and now Alsana). The founders stated that while in treatment at Castlewood, their daughter was convinced that she was raped and abused by "almost 100 people, including teachers, coaches and police officers". Upon his daughter making those claims, the father who founded the group was reported to child protective services. He was eventually cleared of wrongdoing after a 16 month investigation, with a judge stating that his daughter's "testimony was too inconsistent, too contradictory with the other evidence presented, to be credible." As an adult (as of 2025) the daughter has stood by the accusations she first made as a teenager.

=== 2022 Lawsuits ===
A former patient, identified in court documents as Jane Doe, sued Alsana in 2022 making a series of allegations, including that she was assigned a therapist who was not licensed and had no experience treating eating disorders. The suit went on to allege that said therapist made a number of disturbing remarks on social media, such as "I reflected and realized I hurt others on purpose because it makes me feel good" and "Some days I hate myself, and I cause hell in other people's lives." The suit also alleged that Doe was not given medication her doctor had previously prescribed for over two weeks upon entry to the program and that she was given medication meant for other patients. Alsana replied with a public statement that Doe's attorney is "a well-known critic of Alsana and the eating disorder treatment industry generally." Soon thereafter, another former patient (identified as Carla Doe in court documents) filed suit against Alsana making similar allegations as Jane Doe about the same therapist. These lawsuits were eventually dismissed.

== See also ==
- Acadia Healthcare
