= Multiscale Dissociation Inventory =

Diagnostic assessment

Multidimensional Inventory of Dissociation (MID)
- Purpose: Diagnostic method

The Multidimensional Inventory of Dissociation (MID), or Multiscale Dissociation Inventory is a comprehensive, self-administered, multiscale instrument developed by Paul F. Dell. It is designed to assess the domain of dissociative phenomena. The MDI measures 14 major facets of pathological dissociation and uses 23 scales to diagnose dissociative disorders.

== Dissociation ==
Dissociation is a term used to describe the disconnection between mental processes that are ordinarily integrated, including disconnection of the conscious self to physical sensations, emotional reactions, or behaviors. For example, an individual may show dissociative symptoms by displaying no reaction to the death of a valued loved one, by noting that life feels unreal, by disowning all or part of the body, or by claiming amnesia for an important event or an aspect of life.

== Assessment ==
The MDI was designed for clinical research and for diagnostic assessment of patients who present with a mixture of dissociative, post-traumatic, and borderline symptoms.

Compared to other methods to assess the domain of dissociative identity disorder phenomena, MDI demonstrates internal reliability, temporal stability, convergent validity, discriminant validity, and construct validity. Specifically, MDI exhibits incremental validity over the Dissociative Experiences Scale (DES).

MDI aims to achieve internal consistency and provide both convergent and discriminant validity, by exerting a 5-factor structure of the MDI, which includes disengagement, identity dissociation, emotional constriction, memory disturbance, and depersonalization/derealization.

The inclusion of the Multiscale Dissociation Inventory (MDI) in clinical practice can be useful in populations known to be vulnerable to complex trauma.

== See also ==
- Dissociative Experiences Scale
- Structured Clinical Interview for DSM
