= Internal Family Systems Model =

Psychotherapeutic modality focusing on internal parts and Self-leadership

Internal Family Systems
- Pronunciation: /ɪnˈtɜːrnəl ˈfæmɪli ˈsɪstəmz/
- Other names: IFS, IFS therapy
- Specialty: Psychotherapy, clinical psychology, trauma treatment
- Uses: Treatment of C-PTSD, anxiety, depression
- Outcomes: Integration of parts, reduction of trauma symptoms, restoration of Self-leadership

The Internal Family Systems (IFS) model is a non-pathologizing approach to individual psychotherapy developed by Richard C. Schwartz. It combines systems thinking with the view that the mind is composed of relatively discrete subpersonalities, or "parts," each with its own unique viewpoint and qualities. The goal of the therapy is to help clients access their "Self"—described as a core state of compassion and clarity that remains undamaged by trauma—to heal and integrate these parts. In 2015, IFS was listed on the National Registry of Evidence-based Programs and Practices (NREPP) as an evidence-based practice. A 2025 scoping review published in Clinical Psychologist identified IFS as a "promising therapeutic approach" for conditions such as PTSD, depression, and chronic pain, noting significant symptom reduction in pilot trials. It is frequently applied in the treatment of complex post-traumatic stress disorder (C-PTSD), anxiety, and depression.

The model has been widely adopted in clinical trauma treatment and popularized by media such as the film Inside Out. However, it has also faced scrutiny regarding its training practices and rapid expansion. A 2025 investigative report by New York Magazine criticized the model as "pseudoscientific," alleging that "parts work" can be destabilizing for clients with complex trauma if protective mechanisms are bypassed too quickly. In response to the report, the IFS Institute disputed the characterization of the therapy as pseudoscientific, stating that the cases cited involved extreme misapplications of the model distinct from standard training protocols.

== Theory and background ==
IFS has three core theoretical principles: Non-pathological multiplicity of the mind, systems theory, and an adaptation of Buddhist philosophy's practice of witnessing consciousness. Broadly, these principles are used to non-judgmentally observe and evaluate complex mental systems.

This approach builds on Richard Schwartz's experiences with persons experiencing eating disorders, who he noticed often spoke about the self as various conflicting "parts" or sub-personalities. Trained as a family therapist, Schwartz noticed that these parts exhibited common presentations in family therapy, leading him to develop the approach.

IFS is distinct from other parts-based therapies (such as Gestalt therapy) in its emphasis on the systemic relationships between parts and the existence of an undamaged "Self" that acts as an active leader of the system, rather than a passive witness.

Unlike psychodynamic or cognitive approaches that focus on insight or behavioral change, IFS is an experiential therapy. The goal is not merely to talk about the parts, but to directly engage with them in the present moment to facilitate an emotional shift (often described as "unburdening").

=== Metaphysical distinctions ===
Richard Schwartz's later work introduces metaphysical concepts distinct from the core clinical model, specifically "guides" and "unattached burdens," which are described as external entities rather than internal parts. According to Schwartz, unattached burdens—described as ancestral energies or external entities—tend to enter a person's mind during disassociated states, such as trauma or psychedelic experiences. "Guides" are described as benevolent entities, whereas unattached burdens do not have a positive intent.

In recent expansions of the model, Schwartz has explicitly aligned these concepts with spiritual traditions, describing the "Self" not merely as a psychological state but as a sacred essence connecting the individual to a larger "Divine" consciousness. This approach draws parallels between IFS unburdening techniques and shamanic practices. Schwartz proposes that negative entities can be removed using visualization techniques (such as imagery of light or fire), a practice labeled "exorcism" by critics but described by proponents as an energetic release or the healing of intergenerational trauma.

While IFS utilizes language that can appear spiritual, other proponents describe these terms as phenomenological metaphors for neural networks or dissociated affective states. In clinical practice, the "Self" is often framed not as a metaphysical soul, but as a state of "neurological integration" where the prefrontal cortex is able to observe emotional reactivity without being overwhelmed by it.

=== Theoretical foundations and distinctions ===
While the concept of the mind as a multiple entity exists in earlier schools of psychology—including the "Id, Ego, and Superego" of Psychoanalysis and the "Parent, Adult, Child" model of Transactional Analysis—IFS diverges from these models in its specific orientation toward the parts.

Earlier models often focused on strengthening the "Ego" or "Adult" to manage or control the other parts, which were frequently viewed as primitive or chaotic. In contrast, IFS posits that the "manager" (or Ego) is itself a collection of protective parts, not the core "Self".

The goal of IFS is not to use the Ego to control the system, but to "unblend" parts to reveal the Self—described by Schwartz as an undamaged, innate essence characterized by qualities such as calmness, curiosity, and compassion. This parallels Jungian psychology's practice of "Active Imagination", though IFS systematizes the process into a clinical protocol. Schwartz also cites the influence of Virginia Satir's "Parts Party" and Gestalt therapy (specifically the empty chair technique) as precursors to the direct engagement with internal subpersonalities.

== The Self and parts ==
IFS posits that the mind is made up of multiple parts, and underlying them is a person's core or true Self. Like members of a family, a person's inner parts can take on extreme roles or subpersonalities. Each part has its own perspective, interests, memories, and viewpoint. A core tenet of IFS is that every part has a positive intent, even if its actions are counterproductive or cause dysfunction. There is no need to fight with, coerce, or eliminate parts; the IFS method promotes internal connection and harmony to bring the mind back into balance.

=== The Self ===
IFS therapy aims to heal wounded parts and restore mental balance. The first step is to access the core Self and then, from there, understand the different parts in order to heal them. According to Schwartz, "Self energy" (which permits healing) can be deepened or accessed during a "non-dual state," a state he notes is sometimes facilitated by the use of psychedelics.

Schwartz identifies eight qualities that characterize the state of "Self-energy," often referred to as the "8 Cs":

- Compassion
- Curiosity
- Clarity
- Creativity
- Calm
- Confidence
- Courage
- Connectedness

=== Parts ===
In the IFS model, parts are categorized into three roles:

- Exiles: Parts that carry the pain, shame, or fear from past trauma. They are often isolated ("exiled") from the rest of the system to prevent the individual from feeling this pain.
- Managers: A type of "Protector" part that plays a proactive role. They try to maintain control and prevent the Exiles from being triggered by managing the environment, relationships, and daily functioning.
  - Self-like parts: A specific subtype of manager that imitates the qualities of the Self. These parts often appear calm, analytical, or even compassionate, but they lack the true connectivity and curiosity of the Self. Distinguishing between the "true Self" and a "Self-like part" is a key aspect of the clinical protocol.
- Firefighters: A type of "Protector" part that plays a reactive role. When an Exile is triggered (breaking through the Managers' defenses), Firefighters act impulsively to extinguish the emotional pain, often through behaviors like substance use, binge eating, or dissociation.

=== Relationships between parts ===
IFS focuses on the relationships between parts and the core Self. The goal of therapy is to create a cooperative and trusting relationship between the Self and each part. There are three primary types of relationships:

- Protection: Provided by managers and firefighters, who intend to spare exiles from harm and protect the individual from the exile's pain.
- Polarization: Occurs between two parts that battle each other to determine how a person feels or behaves in a certain situation. Each part believes that it must act as it does in order to counter the extreme behavior of the other part.
- Alliance: Formed between two different parts if they are working together to accomplish the same goal.

=== Cultural and legacy burdens ===
In addition to "personal burdens" acquired from a client's direct life experience, IFS posits that parts can carry legacy burdens—beliefs, emotions, or shame transmitted through family lines (aligning with the concept of transgenerational trauma). The model also identifies cultural burdens, which are beliefs absorbed from societal systems (such as racism, patriarchy, or individualism) that parts internalize to survive in their environment. Schwartz argues that healing requires unburdening these systemic influences to allow the Self to lead without the constraints of societal conditioning.

== Method ==
IFS practitioners report a therapeutic method for individual therapy based on the following principles. In this description, the term "protector" refers to either a manager or firefighter.

Parts in extreme roles carry "burdens": painful emotions or negative beliefs they have taken on as a result of past harmful experiences, often in childhood. These burdens are not intrinsic to the part and therefore they can be released or "unburdened" through IFS therapy, allowing the part to assume its natural healthy role. The Self is the agent of psychological healing. Therapists help their clients to access and remain in Self, providing guidance along the way. Protectors often soften up or release from their roles when they establish a harmonious relationship with the Self.

Some protectors unburden themselves from their roles only once the exiles they are protecting have been unburdened. There is no attempt to work with exiles until the client has obtained permission from the protectors who are protecting it. It is paramount in IFS therapy that the therapist ensures that the client's Self has established trust and safety with the protectors before approaching the exiles. IFS therapy emphasizes that when protectors are not respected or bypassed, there is potential for their backlash. Such bypassing can result sometimes in some serious firefighter parts activating, such as suicidal parts. Proponents argue that this protocol makes the method relatively safe, even when working with traumatized parts.

The Self is the natural leader of the internal system. However, because of past harmful incidents or relationships, protectors have stepped in and taken over for the Self. One protector after another is activated and takes the lead, causing dysfunctional behavior. Protectors are also frequently in conflict with each other, resulting in internal chaos or stagnation. The aim is for the protectors to trust the Self and allow it to lead the system, creating internal harmony under its guidance.

The first step is to help the client access the Self. There are two methods for accessing Self-energy of the client:

- Insight approach: Clients self-engage with the protector parts facilitated by the therapist.
- Direct access: A technique where the therapist talks directly to the client's part (rather than the client reporting what the part is saying). This is often used when a protector part is too blended to separate from the client's Self.

=== Differentiation (Unblending) ===
A primary technique in IFS is the "6 Fs," a protocol used to help the client differentiate ("unblend") their core Self from a protective part:

- Find: Locate the part in the body or mind.
- Focus: Turn attention inward toward the part.
- Flesh out: Describe the part's sensory details (image, sound, or sensation).
- Feel toward: Assess how the client feels toward the part (e.g., annoyed, afraid, or curious). If the feeling is not neutral or compassionate, another part is blended and must be asked to step back.
- Befriend: Learn about the part's role and positive intent.
- Fear: Ask the part what it fears would happen if it stopped doing its job.

Once the Self gets to know the protector(s), and the protector(s) feel understood by the Self, the internal attachment rupture is repaired. The process of understanding the protector's positive intent through witnessing can be a slow and iterative process. Then, with the protector's permission, the client accesses the exile(s) to uncover the childhood incident or relationship that is the source of the burden(s) it carries. The exile is retrieved from the past situation and guided to release its burdens. Finally, the protector can then let go of its protective role and assume a less extreme role or a healthy one.

=== Protocol for working with exiles ===
Once protectors have granted permission, the process for working with exiles follows a specific sequence designed to heal the wounded part. This protocol is often described in steps including witnessing, reparenting, retrieving, and unburdening:

- Witnessing: The client's "Self" invites the exile to share its story or memory. The Self witnesses the pain and validates the exile's experience without being overwhelmed by it.
- Reparenting: The Self enters the memory (imaginally) to offer the exile the love, protection, and validation it needed at the time of the trauma but did not receive.
- Retrieval: The Self invites the exile to leave the traumatic scene or time period and come to a safe place in the present (such as an imaginal garden, the client's current home, or another safe location).
- Unburdening: The exile is invited to release the painful emotions, beliefs, or physical sensations ("burdens") it has carried. This is often visualized as releasing a substance (like sludge or smoke) or giving up a heavy object to the elements (fire, water, wind, earth, or light).
- Invitation: Once unburdened, the exile is invited to receive positive qualities (such as joy, playfulness, or innocence) to fill the space where the burden previously existed.

=== Mechanism of change ===
Proponents of the model argue that the "witnessing" and "unburdening" phases of IFS parallel the neurological process of memory reconsolidation, by satisfying the brain's requirements for unlocking and updating a traumatic memory pathway. Specifically, the model simultaneously activates the original emotional memory (via the exile) while creating a contradictory experience of safety and compassion (via the Self), a state known as a "mismatch experience" or prediction error, which is necessary to permanently revise neural networks.

== Specialized protocols ==
=== Couples therapy (IFIO) ===
Intimacy from the Inside Out (IFIO) is a specific protocol for applying IFS to couples therapy, developed by Toni Herbine-Blank. The method focuses on helping each partner "unblend" from their protective parts during conflict to communicate from a place of Self-leadership. A core technique involves the "U-Turn," where partners are guided to turn their attention inward to their own reactive parts rather than focusing on their partner's behavior.

=== Somatic IFS ===
Somatic IFS, developed by Susan McConnell, integrates the IFS model with somatic psychology. This approach emphasizes that parts are not merely mental constructs but are anchored in the body and nervous system. The clinical practice involves five tools: somatic awareness, conscious breathing, radical resonance, mindful movement, and attuned touch. The goal is to help clients witness and unburden parts that are held as chronic tension or physical symptoms.

== Reception and research evidence ==
In a 2013 randomized controlled trial with 79 participants published in the Journal of Rheumatology, rheumatoid arthritis patients receiving IFS therapy demonstrated statistically significant reductions in pain and physical impairment (p < .05) and depressive symptoms (p < .01) compared to the control group, though the intervention did not yield significant improvements in objective measures of disease activity (joint swelling and inflammation). The study noted that sustained improvements were observed one year post-intervention.

In 2015, IFS was listed on the National Registry of Evidence-based Programs and Practices (NREPP) as an evidence-based practice. The registry rated the model as 'effective' for improving general functioning and well-being, and 'promising' for treating phobias, panic, and generalized anxiety. The NREPP was subsequently discontinued and removed from the SAMHSA website in 2018.

The model gained significant prominence in the field of trauma therapy following the publication of The Body Keeps the Score (2015) by psychiatrist Bessel van der Kolk, who endorsed IFS as an effective treatment for emotional regulation and somatic dissociation.

In 2021, a pilot feasibility study of IFS for 17 adults with PTSD and a history of childhood trauma showed a significant reduction in symptoms, with 92% of completers no longer meeting diagnostic criteria after 16 weeks. However, authors noted that as a pilot study without a control group, these findings were preliminary.

While large-scale randomized controlled trials (RCTs) remain limited compared to modalities like cognitive behavioral therapy, a 2025 scoping review published in Clinical Psychologist analyzed the growing body of peer-reviewed research. The review identified IFS as a "promising therapeutic approach" for conditions such as PTSD, depression, and chronic pain, noting significant symptom reduction in pilot trials. However, the authors concluded that further rigorous, large-sample studies are required to fully establish efficacy and determining specific contraindications.

In 2025, New York Magazine (The Cut) published an investigative report linking IFS techniques to malpractice allegations at the Castlewood Treatment Center. Former patients alleged that aggressive "parts work" was used to induce false memories of abuse. Richard Schwartz had served as a paid consultant for the facility. In response, the IFS Institute clarified that the specific malpractice allegations at Castlewood Treatment Center involved a former consultant (Mark Schwartz) rather than the model's founder (Dick Schwartz), and reiterated that official IFS protocol explicitly cautions therapists against validating recovered memories without corroborating evidence. It was stated that the coercive techniques described—such as forcing "parts" to reveal trauma before a client is stable—violate the model's core safety protocols.

== History ==
IFS was developed by Richard C. Schwartz in the 1980s. Schwartz developed the model based on his work with family therapy clients who described their internal lives as interacting parts, though he has also cited spiritual influences and "guides" in the development of his later theories. The model was initially met with skepticism in academic psychiatry, with some concerns raised regarding its safety. However, it later gained significant traction among clinicians. Schwartz eventually left academia and pursued a "grassroots" approach, promoting the model to a wider audience, including practitioners, coaches, and the general public. In 2000, he founded the Center for Self-Leadership (later renamed the IFS Institute) to promote the therapy.

The model gained significantly wider public recognition in 2015, a surge Schwartz attributes to the release of the Pixar film Inside Out, which depicts a similar internal system of personified emotions.

== See also ==
- Polyvagal theory
- Somatic experiencing
- Trauma-informed care
