= Manchild =

Manchild or man child may refer to:

== Music ==
- Man-Child, a 1975 album by Herbie Hancock
- Man-Child (musical), a 1971 Australian musical by Chris Neal
- Manchild (band), an American 1970s soul band from Indianapolis, Indiana
- Manchild (rapper), American Christian rapper
- Manchild, a 1999 album by Shyheim
- "Manchild" (Neneh Cherry song), 1989, and re-released in 2022 featuring Sia
- "Manchild", a song by Eels from the 1996 album Beautiful Freak
- "Manchild" (Sabrina Carpenter song), 2025

== Other uses ==
- Manchild (TV series), a BBC TV series
- "The Man Child", a short story by James Baldwin
- Manchild: The Schea Cotton Story, a documentary on American basketball player Schea Cotton

== See also ==
- Adult child (disambiguation)
- "Manboy", a song performed by Eric Saade
- Puer aeternus (Latin for "eternal boy"), a child-god who is forever young in mythology
