= Ugo Flumiani =

Italian painter (1876–1938)

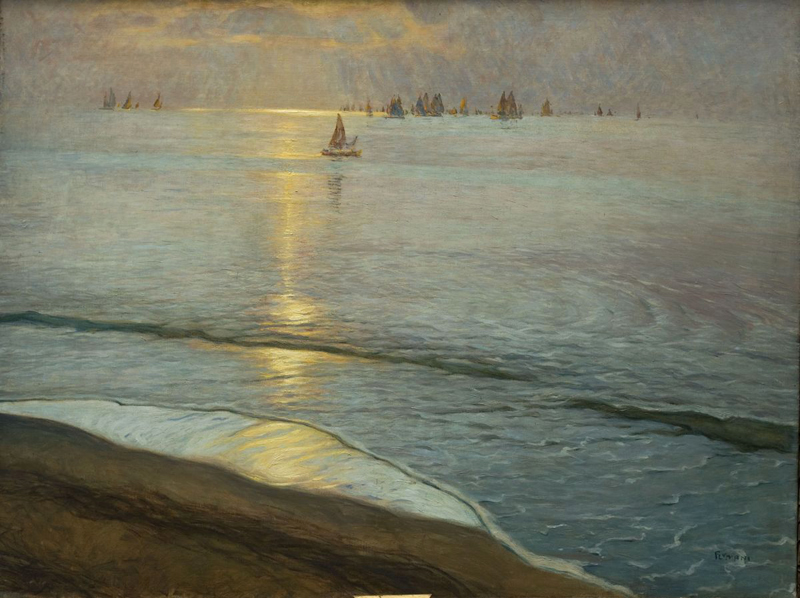
Marine landscape with barques (1909), Casa Cavazzini, Udine

Ugo Flumiani (26 January 1876 – 8 December 1938) was an Italian landscape, mainly marine painter.

Flumiani was born in Trieste. He studied at the Accademia di Belle Arti di Venezia with Guglielmo Ciardi, and subsequently in Bologna and in Milan. Subsequently, he returned to Trieste and lived there until his death. In 1899, he took part in the Venice Biennale, and later exhibited in Venice on a regular basis. He painted in the impressionist style but never joined any artistic movements.

Flumiani was a friend of speleologist Eugenio Boegan, and in the 1930s he made several painting of Škocjan Caves for the Alpine Society of the Julian Alps.

He died in Trieste in 1938. He is often considered a local artist associated with Trieste. A street in Trieste is named after Flumiani.

Flumiani's works are kept in a number of museums including Casa Cavazzini in Udine and Revoltella Museum in Trieste.
