= John Bradshaw (author) =

American educator and author (1933 – 2016)

- Born: John Elliot Bradshaw; June 29, 1933; Houston, Texas, U.S.
- Died: May 8, 2016 (aged 82); Houston, Texas, U.S.
- Occupations: Author, counselor, motivational speaker, television host
- Writing career
- Notable works: Bradshaw On: The Family (1986); Homecoming: Reclaiming and Championing Your Inner Child (1990)

John Elliot Bradshaw (June 29, 1933 – May 8, 2016) was an American educator, counselor, motivational speaker, and author who hosted a number of PBS television programs on topics such as addiction, recovery, codependency, and spirituality. Bradshaw was active in the self-help movement, and was credited with popularizing such ideas as the "wounded inner child" and the dysfunctional family. In promotional materials, interviews, and reviews of his work, he was often referred to as a theologian.

Bradshaw was the author of six books, several of which held top slots as New York Times bestsellers; his book Homecoming reached No. 1. During the 1980s and 1990s he hosted a number of PBS television broadcasts based on his books. He served on the board of directors of the Palmer Drug Abuse Program and as the national director of the John Bradshaw Center at Ingleside Hospital in Los Angeles, California.

== Early life ==
Bradshaw was born in Houston, Texas, into a troubled family and was abandoned by an alcoholic father, who himself was also abandoned by his own father. Bradshaw won scholarships to study for the Roman Catholic priesthood. He earned a B.A. degree in Sacred Theology and an M.A. degree in philosophy from the University of Toronto in Canada. He graduated in 1963 and then returned to academia six years later at Rice University in Houston, Texas, for three years of graduate work in psychology and religion. Bradshaw said alcohol addiction and other problems led to his decision to end his plans for the priesthood.

== Career ==
Throughout the 1970s, John Bradshaw served as a management consultant at Drillco Manufacturing Company and as a leadership trainer at Denka Chemical Company. He was also director of human resources and served on the board of directors of Texas General Oil Company. Bradshaw was the developer and presenter of workshops for forty Fortune 500 companies and thousands of evolved non-profits and for-profit institutions.

Bradshaw was the author of six books, three of which are New York Times Best Sellers. His work sold over 10 million copies and was published in 42 languages. His final book, Post-Romantic Stress Disorder, was published by Health Communications in 2014. In 1999, Bradshaw was nominated by a group of his peers as "One Of The 100 Most Influential Writers On Emotional Health in the 20th Century." In All About Love, author and academic bell hooks celebrates Bradshaw's 1992 book Creating Love: The Next Great Stage of Growth as one of her favorite books in part because it "valiantly attempts to establish the link between male domination (the institutionalization of patriarchy) and the lack of love of families." Hooks believes that Bradshaw's work was somewhat overlooked during his lifetime because of his rejection of traditional gender norms.

In 1991, Bradshaw won a Daytime Emmy Award for Outstanding Talk Show Host for his series Bradshaw On: Homecoming. He also appeared on Oprah, Geraldo, Sally, Dr. Ruth, Tom Snyder, Donahue, Politically Incorrect, CNN-Talk Back Live, and Sirius Radio.

He presented lectures and workshops for educational, professional and social organizations starting in 1964. He served in various organizations, such as: member of the board of directors and president of the Palmer Drug Abuse Program (1981–88); national director of Life-Plus Co-Dependency Treatment Center (1987–1990); founder and national director of the John Bradshaw Center at Ingleside Hospital in Los Angeles (1991–1997); and member, national board of directors, of The International Montessori Society (1990–2016). He was an honorary lifetime board member of the Council on Alcohol and Drugs in Houston.

Starting in 1999, Bradshaw was a senior fellow at The Meadows Institute. The Meadows is a multi-disorder inpatient facility in Arizona specializing in the treatment of a range of addictions. The facility's intensive treatment focuses on drug and alcohol addiction, sexual addictions, depression, eating disorders, psychological conditions, affective disorders and compulsive behaviors. It takes a holistic approach to addiction recovery and includes a wide variety of therapeutic approaches, including the Twelve-step program of Alcoholics Anonymous.

== Personal life ==
Bradshaw resided in the prestigious Shadyside subdivision of Houston, Texas, with his wife, Karen Ann. The pair have two children, John Bradshaw, Jr, and Victoria Katerina Bradshaw.

== Death ==
On May 8, 2016, Bradshaw died of heart failure at the age of 82 and left behind his wife and partner of 20 years, Karen Ann Bradshaw, and their two children, John Jr, and Ariel Harper.

== Bibliography ==
- Bradshaw On: The Family – 1986
- Bradshaw on the Family: A Revolutionary Way of Self Discovery. Deerfield Beach, Florida: Health Communications. 1988. ISBN 978-0932194541.
- Bradshaw On: Healing the Shame that Binds You. Deerfield Beach, Florida: Health Communications. 1988. ISBN 978-0757303234.
- Homecoming: Reclaiming and Championing Your Inner Child. New York, NY: Bantam Books. 1990. ISBN 978-0-553-35389-1.
- Creating Love. New York, NY: Bantam Books. 1992. ISBN 978-0-553-37305-9.
- Family Secrets. New York, NY: Bantam Books. 1995. ISBN 978-0-553-37498-8.
- Bradshaw On: The Family: A New Way of Creating Solid Self-Esteem. Deerfield Beach, Florida: Health Communications. 1996. ISBN 978-1-55874-427-1.
- Reclaiming Virtue: How We Can Develop the Moral Intelligence to Do the Right Thing at the Right Time for the Right Reason. New York, NY: Bantam Books. 2009. ISBN 978-0-553-09592-0.
- Post-Romantic Stress Disorder: What to Do When the Honeymoon Is Over. Deerfield Beach, Florida: Health Communications. 2014.

Television

- Spotlight: weekly program (host), 1969–1972
- The Bradshaw Difference: syndicated talk show produced by MGM Television, 1996
- Speaking the Truth in Love: Independent Production 2009

PBS television network

- The Eight Stages of Man: eight-part series, 1982
- Bradshaw On the Family: ten-part series, 1985
- Where Are You Father?: one-hour program, 1986
- Healing the Shame that Binds You: one-hour program, 1987
- Adult Children Of Dysfunctional Families: two-hour program, 1988
- Surviving Divorce: ninety-minute program, 1989
- Bradshaw On Homecoming: ten-part series, 1990
- Creating Love: ten-part series, 1992–1993
- Eating Disorders: three-part series, 1994–1995
- Bradshaw On: Family Secrets: six-part series, 1995

== See also ==
Self-help
