= Reparenting =

Form of psychotherapy

Reparenting is a psychotherapeutic approach developed within transactional analysis in which the therapist seeks to provide corrective emotional experiences intended to address the effects of adverse or dysfunctional early caregiving. Different forms of reparenting have been developed since the late 1960s, varying in the degree to which the therapist assumes a parental role during treatment.

The approach is based on theoretical concepts from transactional analysis and has primarily been associated with practitioners within that tradition. Claims regarding its effectiveness, particularly in the treatment of severe mental disorders such as schizophrenia, remain controversial and have not achieved broad acceptance in mainstream clinical psychology or psychiatry.

== History ==
In the late 1960s, Jacqui Lee Schiff developed a form of therapy based on transactional analysis theory. She would dub this form of therapy as total regression reparenting. Schiff and her colleagues reported positive outcomes in the treatment of people diagnosed with schizophrenia, leading to wider interest in the approach. Following these reports, other transactional analysis practitioners developed alternative forms of reparenting. The other most notable forms of reparenting that later came include time-limited, spot, and self-re-parenting. Reparenting has been described by some authors as part of the broader New Age psychotherapy movement.

== Mechanism ==
Deriving from transactional analysis theory, reparenting seeks to treat problems associated with defective parenting. The theory of reparenting states that psychological problems due to defective parenting can be overcome by reforming the parent ego state of the client. This is achieved by regressing the client to a state of mind that is vulnerable to new experiences, called the child ego state in transactional analysis theory. Within the model, once the client is in the child ego state, the therapist adopts the role of the client's parent and attempts to correctly reparent the client. The nature of reparenting by the therapist should be more positive and influence the client into developing a healthier parent ego state with the goal of modifying internalized patterns associated with earlier caregiving experiences.

== Methods ==
Due to the wide varying forms of reparenting, each therapist may adopt different methods when treating clients. However, the mechanism that underlie the theory of reparenting is generally agreed upon. Depending on the form of reparenting, therapy may begin with the regression of the client to the child ego state. The therapists may encourage by partaking in child-rearing acts such as bottle feeding, lap pillows, and other techniques wherein the client consciously adopts physical positions and behaviors of a small child. Once the ideal level of closeness is achieved, the therapist can finally proceed to providing the messages that reform the client's negative way of thinking by lecturing, entering discussions, or other forms of communication appropriate in a parent-child relationship.

== Forms of reparenting ==
=== Total regression ===
Developed by Jaqui Lee Schiff, this form of reparenting was the first form of therapy built upon transactional analysis theory. Typically, the patient lives with the therapist for up to several years at an institution. During this time, the patient is totally immersed in the reliving of his or her childhood. The therapist provides all the care and nurturing with the aim of restructuring what transactional analysis describes as the Parent ego state. Total regression reparenting is famously associated with the Cathexis Institution, which was founded by Jaqui Lee Schiff.

=== Time-limited regression ===
Thomas Wilson developed time-limited regression reparenting for the purpose of treating patients with schizophrenia. But unlike Schiff's therapy, the patient is only required to attend five two-hour sessions with the therapist instead of living with the therapist. Nurturing is also more intensive and more structured than total regression reparenting.

=== Spot reparenting ===
Spot reparenting was developed by Russell Osnes. In addition to also being less time intensive than Schiff's total regression reparenting, Osnes's form of reparenting focuses more on patients traumatized by specific experiences and incidents rather than by general disturbances in childhood.

=== Self-reparenting ===
Self-reparenting was developed by Muriel James. Unlike prior forms of reparenting, James's form of reparenting did not attempt to totally replace the parent ego state of the client. Instead, the therapy confirms the positive aspects already apparent in the client's ego. The client is also the primary agent in therapy instead of the therapist.

=== Del Casale's method ===
Developed by Del Casale, this form of reparenting, like Wilson's time-limited regression reparenting, focused primarily on treatment for schizophrenic patients. But unlike both Schiff and Wilson, Del Casale proposes that the therapist does not play the role of the parent for the client. Instead, Del Casale had the client's actual parents become an active participator in the therapy. Del Casale bases this model on the belief that some parts of the client's parent ego state is still healthy, and that defective parenting is not at the fault of the parents, but of the weak communication between the parent and child.

== Research ==
Published research on reparenting has consisted largely of case reports, small observational studies and articles written within the transactional analysis field. The limited sample sizes, absence of independent replication and frequent lack of randomized control groups restrict the conclusions that can be drawn from this literature.

=== Kline case ===
Dr. David Kline practiced Schiff's total regression reparenting and was a staff member of the Cathexis Institute. Among his most noted clients was a young girl diagnosed with severe anorexia nervosa. Dr. Kline theorized that the patient's anorexia was due to her mother's strict expectations. Reparenting was then used to counteract the negative influence of the patient's mother's parenting style. According to the patient, the therapy was a success, and she now lives with more confidence in her image as suggested by her therapist's reparenting.

=== Biochemical ===
Jaqui Lee Schiff conducted a study to attain biochemical evidence for reparenting's effectiveness on schizophrenics. Schiff based this study on the observation that individuals with schizophrenia tend to have low levels of tryptophan reuptake. In the study, 20 patients diagnosed with schizophrenia were divided into three groups: a group going through reparenting treatment at the Cathexis Institute, a group going through separate treatment at the Lafayette Institute, and a control group that did not receive reparenting treatment. The results show that the subjects going through reparenting treatment at the Cathexis and Lafayette Institute had a mean tryptophan reuptake of 3.32 and 3.75 respectively. The control group had a group mean of 2.13. The numbers show that subjects that received reparenting had significantly higher tryptophan reuptake at the end of the experiment.

=== Self-esteem ===
Lilian M. Wissink conducted a study to determine self-reparenting's effect on self-esteem. Human subjects were divided into two groups, a treatment group that consisted of 10 people, and a control group that consisted of 12 people. The sample group was made up of students and staff from a rural university, and only the treatment group went through self-reparenting treatment. The subjects were given questionnaires to measure their level of self-esteem before and after treatment. The result showed that subjects that received self-reparenting had significantly increased levels of self-esteem while the control group had decreased levels of self-esteem.

=== Crime rehabilitation ===
Gloria Noriega conducted a study to analyze the effects of self-reparenting on female delinquents in jail, who were between the ages of eleven and eighteen. In the study, all of the subjects received exactly the same treatment to support the theory that the effects of self-reparenting can be directly replicated. According to the results, twenty seven of the twenty eight subjects expressed less aggression, fewer conflicts with parents, increased motivation to achieve goals, and increased self-esteem in comparison to how they were before treatment. The subject that didn't show change was a drug abuser and clinicians concluded that more specialized treatment was required.

== Criticism and ethical concerns ==
=== Terminology and definitions ===
Although reparenting is widely practiced, there is no set system of terminology among practitioners. In addition, the definitions of commonly used terms differ in definition among practitioners. The vagueness produced by these two weaknesses present danger of miscommunication between the therapist and the patient during treatment. The patient may also not fully understand the information shared with them when contracting or terminating treatment.

=== Therapist-patient relationship ===
The nature of reparenting often requires the therapist to develop a close relationship with the client. There is no protocol to provide the boundary as to what the therapist can or cannot do. Often, it is up to the therapist to determine the plan of action to take when faced with a dilemma during treatment.

=== Frame of reference ===
There is no way to objectively determine the success in completely replacing the client's parent ego state after reparenting therapy. The therapist can only rely on the client's subjective statement, which may conflict with the therapist's account of the results. This conflict leads to questioning whether the therapy actually succeeded in reforming the Parent ego state.

=== Monitoring ===
This problem is especially true for total regression reparenting. Clients in therapy are totally immersed in an environment that promotes regression into the child ego state. However, during this time at which the client may spend months or years, the client is left at the mercy of the therapist and the institution.

=== Scientific efficacy ===
Although some studies have been done to test the efficacy of reparenting, the amount of statistically powerful studies available are few. Few studies try to confirm the mechanism or isolate moderating variables of reparenting.
