= Richard C. Schwartz =

American therapist and academic (born 1949)

- Born: September 14, 1949 (age 77) —
- Education: Ph.D. in Marriage and Family Therapy, Purdue University
- Occupation: Psychotherapist · Author · Academic
- Years active: 1970s–present
- Organizations: IFS Institute; Family Institute at Northwestern University; Institute for Juvenile Research (University of Illinois, Chicago)
- Known for: Creator of the Internal Family Systems (IFS) model of therapy; founder of the Center for Self Leadership (now IFS Institute)
- Notable work: Introduction to the Internal Family Systems Model (2001)

Richard C. Schwartz (born 14 September 1949), is an American systemic family therapist, academic, author, and creator of the Internal Family Systems (IFS) branch of therapy. He developed his foundational work with IFS in the 1980s after theorizing that his clients were made up of many different pieces of "parts" of their "Self." He teaches that, "Our inner parts contain valuable qualities and our core Self knows how to heal, allowing us to become integrated and whole. In IFS all parts are welcome."

== Career ==
Schwartz earned his Ph.D. in marriage and family therapy from Purdue University. He has taught at several institutions, including the Institute for Juvenile Research at the University of Illinois at Chicago and Northwestern University as well as Cambridge Health Alliance.

He is the founder of the Center for Self Leadership in 2000, but in 2019, the organization changed its name to the IFS Institute.

Although Schwartz has been featured in hundreds of articles and podcasts worldwide with positive reviews of IFS, one 2025 article published in The Cut alleged that while consulting for Castlewood Treatment Center, Richard C. Schwartz was aware of Mark Schwartz's (no relation) IFS patient treatment that became the subject of abuse and recovered memories lawsuits.

== Publications ==
Schwartz has published over 50 articles about IFS, and his authorship includes the following books:

- Introduction to the Internal Family Systems Model, Second Edition
- Internal Family Systems: Skills Training Manual (co-authored with Frank G. Anderson & Martha Sweezy)
- No Bad Parts: Healing Trauma and Restoring Wholeness with the Internal Family Systems Model
- The Mosaic Mind: Empowering the Tormented Selves of Child Abuse Survivors (co-authored with Regina A. Goulding)
- You Are The One You've Been Waiting For: Bringing Courageous Love To Intimate Relationships
- Many Minds, One Self: Evidence for a Radical Shift in Paradigm (co-authored with Robert R. Falconer)
- Handbook of Family Therapy Training and Supervision (Edited by Howard A. Liddle, Douglas C. Breunlin, and Richard C. Schwartz)
