= Dissociative Experiences Scale =

Questionnaire to screen for dissociative identity disorder

- Purpose: measures dissociate symptoms

The Dissociative Experiences Scale (DES) is a psychological self-assessment questionnaire that measures dissociative symptoms.

== Background ==
It contains twenty-eight questions and returns an overall score as well as four sub-scale results.

DES is intended to be a screening test, since only 17% of patients with scores over 30 will be diagnosed with having dissociative identity disorder. Patients with lower scores above normal may have other post-traumatic conditions.

The DES-II contains the same questions but with a different response scale.

== See also ==
- Multiscale Dissociation Inventory
- Structured Clinical Interview for DSM
