= Dissociation (psychology) =

Feeling of detachment from reality

- Specialty: Clinical psychology, psychiatry

Dissociation is a concept which concerns a wide array of experiences, ranging from a mild emotional detachment from the immediate surroundings, to a more severe disconnection from physical and emotional experiences. The major characteristic of all dissociative phenomena involves a detachment from reality, rather than a false perception of reality as in psychosis.

The phenomena are diagnosable under the DSM-5 as a group of disorders as well as a symptom of other disorders through various diagnostic tools. Its cause is believed to be related to neurobiological mechanisms, trauma, anxiety, and psychoactive drugs.

== History ==
French philosopher and psychologist Pierre Janet (1859–1947) is considered to be the author of the concept of dissociation. Unlike some conceptions of dissociation, Janet did not believe that dissociation was a psychological defense.

Janet claimed that dissociation occurred only in persons who had a constitutional weakness of mental functioning that led to hysteria when they were stressed. Although it is true that many of Janet's case histories described traumatic experiences, he never considered dissociation to be a defense against those experiences. He considered trauma to be one of many stressors that could worsen the already-impaired "mental deficiency" of a hysteric, thereby generating a cascade of hysterical (in today's language, "dissociative") symptoms.

Although there was great interest in dissociation during the last two decades of the nineteenth century (especially in France and England), this interest rapidly waned with the coming of the new century. Janet largely turned his attention to other matters. There was a sharp peak in interest in dissociation in America from 1890 to 1910, especially in Boston as reflected in the work of William James, Boris Sidis, Morton Prince, and William McDougall. In America, interest in dissociation rapidly succumbed to the surging academic interest in psychoanalysis and behaviorism.

For most of the twentieth century, there was little interest in dissociation. Despite that disinterest, a review of 76 previously published cases from the 1790s to 1942 was published in 1944, describing clinical phenomena consistent with that seen by Janet and by therapists today. In 1971, Bowers and her colleagues presented a detailed, and still quite valid, treatment article. The authors of this article included leading thinkers of their time – John G. Watkins (who developed ego-state therapy) and Zygmunt A. Piotrowski (famed for his work on the Rorschach test). Further interest in dissociation was evoked when Ernest Hilgard (1977) published his neodissociation theory in the 1970s. During the 1970s and 1980s, an increasing number of clinicians and researchers wrote about dissociation, particularly multiple personality disorder.

Attention to dissociation as a clinical feature has been growing in recent years as knowledge of post-traumatic stress disorder (PTSD) increased, due to interest in dissociative identity disorder (DID), and as neuroimaging research and population studies show its relevance.

== Psychopathological ==
Historically the psychopathological concept of dissociation has also another root: the conceptualization of Eugen Bleuler that looks into dissociation related to schizophrenia.

== Diagnosis ==
Dissociation is commonly displayed on a continuum. In mild cases, dissociation can be regarded as a coping mechanism or defense mechanism in seeking to master, minimize or tolerate stress – including boredom or conflict. At the non-pathological end of the continuum, dissociation describes common events such as daydreaming. Further along the continuum are non-pathological altered states of consciousness.

More pathological dissociation involves dissociative disorders. These disorders can include: a sense that self or the world is unreal or altered (depersonalization derealization disorder), a loss of memory (dissociative amnesia), forgetting identity or assuming a new self (dissociative fugue), and separate streams of consciousness, identity and self (dissociative identity disorder, formerly termed multiple personality disorder). Although some dissociative disruptions involve amnesia, other dissociative events do not.

Dissociative disorders are sometimes triggered by trauma, but may be preceded only by stress, psychoactive substances, or no identifiable trigger at all. The ICD-10 classifies conversion disorder as a dissociative disorder. The Diagnostic and Statistical Manual of Mental Disorders groups all dissociative disorders into a single category and recognizes dissociation as a symptom of acute stress disorder, post-traumatic stress disorder, and borderline personality disorder.

Misdiagnosis is common among people who display symptoms of dissociative disorders, with an average of seven years to receive proper diagnosis and treatment. Research is ongoing into etiologies, symptomology, and valid and reliable diagnostic tools. In the general population, dissociative experiences that are not clinically significant are highly prevalent with 60% to 65% of the respondents indicating that they have had some dissociative experiences.

=== Diagnostic and Statistical Manual of Mental Disorders ===
Diagnoses listed under the DSM-5 are dissociative identity disorder, dissociative amnesia, depersonalization/derealization disorder, other specified dissociative disorder and unspecified dissociative disorder. The list of available dissociative disorders listed in the DSM-5 changed from the DSM-IV-TR, as the authors removed the diagnosis of dissociative fugue, classifying it instead as a subtype of dissociative amnesia. Furthermore, the authors recognized derealization on the same diagnostic level of depersonalization with the opportunity of differentiating between the two.

The DSM-5-TR considers symptoms such as depersonalization, derealization and dissociative amnesia to be core features of dissociative disorders. The DSM-5 carried these symptoms over and described symptoms as positive and negative. Positive symptoms include unwanted intrusions that alter continuity of subjective experiences, which account for the first two symptoms listed earlier with the addition of fragmentation of identity. Negative symptoms include loss of access to information and mental functions that are normally readily accessible, which describes amnesia.

=== Peritraumatic dissociation ===
Peritraumatic dissociation is considered to be dissociation that is experienced during and immediately following a traumatic event. Some of the symptoms include but are not limited to depersonalization, derealization, dissociative amnesia, out-of-body experiences, emotional numbness, and altered time perception. This specific disorder has been related to self preservation and the body's natural instinct to protect itself. Research is on-going related to its development, its importance, and its relationship to trauma, dissociative disorders, and predicting the development of PTSD.

=== Measurements ===
Two of the most commonly used screening tools in the community are the Dissociative Experiences Scale and the Multiscale Dissociation Inventory. Meanwhile, the Structured Clinical Interview for DSM-IV – Dissociative Disorders (SCID-D) and its second iteration, the SCID-D-R, are both semi-structured interviews and are considered psychometrically strong diagnostic tools.

Other tools include the Office Mental Status Examination (OMSE), which is used clinically due to inherent subjectivity and lack of quantitative use. There is also the Dissociative Disorders Interview Schedule (DDIS), which lacks substantive clarity for differential diagnostics.

Peritraumatic dissociation is measured through the Peritraumatic Dissociative Scale.

== Etiology ==
=== Neurobiological mechanism ===
Preliminary research suggests that dissociation-inducing events, drugs like ketamine, and seizures generate slow rhythmic activity (1–3 Hz) in layer 5 neurons of the posteromedial cortex in humans (retrosplenial cortex in mice). These slow oscillations disconnect other brain regions from interacting with the posteromedial cortex, which may explain the overall experience of dissociation.

=== Trauma ===
Dissociation has been described as one of a constellation of symptoms experienced by some victims of multiple forms of childhood trauma, including physical, psychological, and sexual abuse. This is supported by studies which suggest that dissociation is correlated with a history of trauma.

Dissociation appears to have a high specificity and a low sensitivity to having a self-reported history of trauma, which means that dissociation is much more common among those who are traumatized, yet at the same time there are many people who have suffered from trauma but who do not show dissociative symptoms.

Adult dissociation when combined with a history of child abuse and otherwise interpersonal violence-related posttraumatic stress disorder has been shown to contribute to disturbances in parenting behavior, such as exposure of young children to violent media. Such behavior may contribute to cycles of familial violence and trauma.

Symptoms of dissociation resulting from trauma may include depersonalization, psychological numbing, disengagement, or amnesia regarding the events of the abuse. It has been hypothesized that dissociation may provide a temporarily effective defense mechanism in cases of severe trauma; however, in the long term, dissociation is associated with decreased psychological functioning and adjustment.

Other symptoms sometimes found along with dissociation in victims of traumatic abuse (often referred to as "sequelae to abuse") include anxiety, PTSD, low self-esteem, somatization, depression, chronic pain, interpersonal dysfunction, substance abuse, self-harm and suicidal ideation or actions. These symptoms may lead the victim to present the symptoms as the source of the problem.

Child abuse, especially chronic abuse starting at early ages, has been related to high levels of dissociative symptoms in a clinical sample, including amnesia for abuse memories. It has also been seen that girls who suffered abuse during their childhood had higher reported dissociation scores than boys who reported similar abuse during their childhood. A non-clinical sample of adult women linked increased levels of dissociation to sexual abuse by a significantly older person prior to age 15, and dissociation has also been correlated with a history of childhood physical and sexual abuse. When sexual abuse is examined, the levels of dissociation were found to increase along with the severity of the abuse.

=== Psychoactive substances ===
Psychoactive drugs can often induce a state of temporary dissociation. Substances with dissociative properties include ketamine, nitrous oxide, tiletamine, amphetamine, dextromethorphan, MK-801, PCP, methoxetamine, salvia, muscimol, atropine, ibogaine, minocycline, diphenhydramine, inhalants, and others .

Psychoactive substances that cause temporary dissociation tend to be NMDA receptor antagonists or κ-opioid receptor agonists. Although, this is not necessarily always the case and dissociation can occur with non-hallucinogenic drugs.

== Correlations ==
=== Hypnosis and suggestibility ===
There is evidence to suggest that dissociation is correlated with hypnotic suggestibility, specifically with dissociative symptoms related to trauma. However, the relationship between dissociation and hypnotic suggestibility appears to be complex and indicates further research is necessary.

Aspects of hypnosis include absorption, dissociation, suggestibility, and willingness to receive behavioral instruction from others. Both hypnotic suggestibility and dissociation tend to be less mindful, and hypnosis is used as a treatment modality for dissociation, anxiety, chronic pain, trauma, and more. Difference between hypnosis and dissociation: one is suggested, imposed by self or other, meaning dissociation is generally more spontaneous altering of awareness.

== Treatment ==
When receiving treatment, patients are assessed to discover their level of functioning. Some patients might be higher functioning than others. This is taken into account when creating a patient's potential treatment targets. To start off treatment, time is dedicated to increasing a patient's mental level and adaptive actions in order to gain a balance in both their mental and behavioral action. Once this is achieved, the next goal is to work on removing or minimizing the phobia made by traumatic memories, which is causing the patient to dissociate. The final step of treatment includes helping patients work through their grief in order to move forward and be able to engage in their own lives. This is done with the use of new coping skills attained through treatment. One coping skill that can improve dissociation is mindfulness due to the introduction of staying in present awareness while observing non-judgmentally and increasing the ability to regulate emotions. Specifically in adolescents, mindfulness has been shown to reduce dissociation after practicing mindfulness for three weeks.

== Psychoanalysis ==
Defense mechanisms are a key part of the theory of psychoanalysis. According to Freudian theory, defense mechanisms are psychological strategies that are unconsciously used to protect a person from anxiety arising from unacceptable thoughts or feelings. Freud and his daughter Anna Freud developed and elaborated on these ideas.

A 2012 review article supports the hypothesis that current or recent trauma may affect an individual's assessment of the more distant past, changing the experience of the past and resulting in dissociative states.

=== Jung ===
Carl Jung described pathological manifestations of dissociation as special or extreme cases of the normal operation of the psyche. This structural dissociation, opposing tension, and hierarchy of basic attitudes and functions in normal individual consciousness is the basis of Jung's Psychological Types. Jung's theory suggests that dissociation, which is often seen as a pathological or abnormal process, is actually a natural and necessary aspect of consciousness. This ability to dissociate allows the mind to develop and evolve by creating distinct parts of the self. This concept is a key part of Jung's Psychological Types.

== See also ==
- Borderline personality disorder – Personality disorder
- Cognitive dissonance – Mental phenomenon of holding contradictory beliefs
- Derealization – Perception that the external world is not real
- Dissociative identity disorder – Mental illness with multiple personality states
- Emotion work – Management of one's own feelings, or work done in an effort to maintain a relationship
- Emotional detachment – Inability and/or disinterest in emotionally connecting to others
- Emotional labor – Work managing feelings and expressions
- Fantasy prone personality – Disposition toward strong fantasies
- Identity (social science) – Qualities, beliefs, personality, looks and/or expressions that distinguish a person
- Identity formation – Process in which humans develop a view of themselves and of their identity
- Identity performance – How persons present themselves in social interactions
- International Society for the Study of Trauma and Dissociation – Nonprofit professional organization in the U.S.
- Mind-wandering – Experience of thoughts not remaining on a single topic for a long period of time
- Repressed memory – Theory that memory may be stored in the unconscious mind
- Splitting (psychology) – Failure to think in nuances
