= Kidult (disambiguation) =

A kidult is an adult with childish interests.

Kidult may also refer to:

- Kidult, a 2007 album by Louis Cheung
- "Kidult", a track by His Electro Blue Voice from the Sub Pop 1000 alternative rock album
- "Kidult", a title by Yoon Doo-joon
- "Kidult", a 2020 song by Seventeen from the album Heng:garæ

== See also ==
- Kidulthood, a 2006 British film
