= John G. Watkins =

American psychologist (1913–2012)

John Goodrich Watkins (17 March 1913, Salmon, Idaho – 12 January 2012, Longmont, Colorado) was an American psychologist best known for his work in the areas of hypnosis, dissociation, and multiple personalities.

== Biography ==
Watkins graduated from the College of Idaho and received a Ph.D. from Columbia University. He was professor emeritus at the University of Montana, where he taught for many years.

With his wife, Helen Watkins, he developed ego-state therapy, which uses analysis of underlying personalities, rather than traditional talk therapy, to find the causes of psychological problems. The most famous example of the use of ego-state therapy was the interrogation of the Hillside Strangler, in which Watkins solicited a confession by revealing the killer's multiple personalities.

Watkins also published research suggesting that hypnotic techniques for pain reduction may work by displacing the pain into “covert” ego states. Accordingly, the pain is not eliminated by the hypnotic intervention but is dissociated from conscious awareness and fully experienced by an underlying ego state. The underlying ego state may suffer trauma as a result experiencing the pain.

Watkins died on 12 January 2012. He was 98 years old.

== Publications ==
=== Articles ===
- Watkins, John G. (January 1971). "The affect bridge: a hypnoanalytic technique". The International Journal of Clinical and Experimental Hypnosis. 19 (1): 21–27. doi:10.1080/00207147108407148. PMID 5100851.
- Watkins, John G. (1988). "The Management of Malevolent Ego State s in Multiple Personality Disorder".

=== Books ===
- Watkins, John G. (1947). Hypnotherapy of War Neuroses. The Ronald Press Company. ISBN 978-0-9819284-5-6.
- Watkins, John G. (1987). The Practice of Clinical Hypnosis. Irvington Publishers. ISBN 978-0-82901-462-4.
- Watkins, John G. (1997). Ego States, Theory and Therapy. ISBN 978-0-393-70259-0.
- Watkins, John G. (2001). Adventures in Human Understanding. ISBN 978-1-899836-75-8.
- Watkins, John G. (2005). Emotional Resonance, Sentient Publications. ISBN 978-1-59181-042-1.
- Watkins, John G. (2008). Advanced Hypnotherapy. ISBN 978-0-415-95627-7.
