= Milk fever =

Disease of cattle

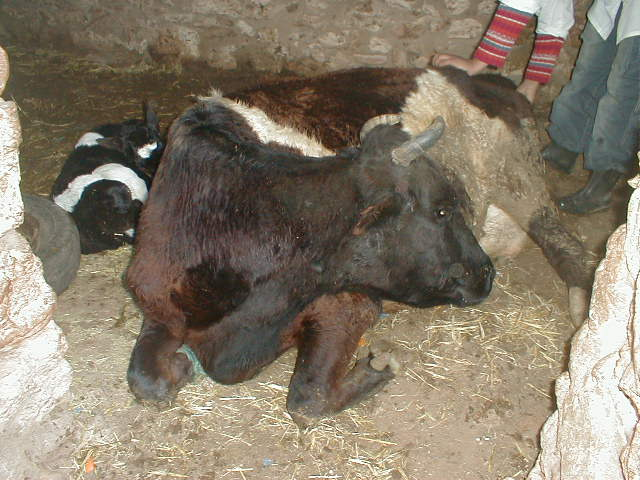
Typical milk fever posture; cow in sternal recumbency with its head tucked into its flank.

Milk fever, postparturient hypocalcemia, or parturient paresis is a disease, primarily in dairy cattle but also seen in beef cattle and non-bovine domesticated animals, characterized by reduced blood calcium levels (hypocalcemia). It occurs following parturition (birth), at onset of lactation, when demand for calcium for colostrum and milk production exceeds the body's ability to mobilize calcium. "Fever" is a misnomer, as the disease generally does not cause elevated body temperature. Milk fever is more commonly seen in older animals (which have reduced ability to mobilize calcium from bone) and in certain breeds (such as Channel Island breeds).

== Clinical signs ==
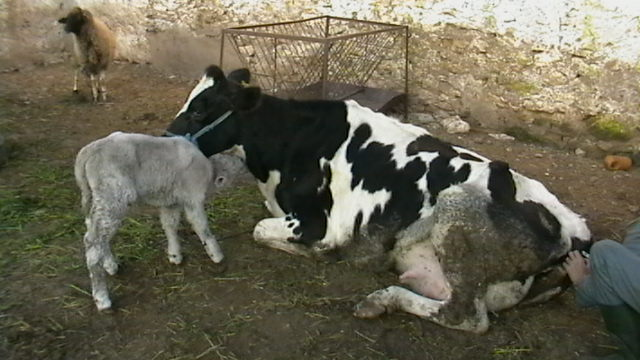
Cow lying in sternal recumbency (with sternum in contact with the ground)

The clinical signs of milk fever can be divided into three distinct stages:

=== Stage 1 ===
In this stage, cows are mobile but show signs of hypersensitivity and excitability such as restlessness, tremors, ear twitching, head bobbing, and mild ataxia. If not treated, symptoms usually progress to stage 2.

=== Stage 2 ===
In this stage, cows can no longer stand and present in sternal recumbency. Tachycardia, weakened heart contraction and peripheral pulses are observed. Cows appear dull, have dry muzzles, cold extremities, and their body temperature drops. Smooth muscle paralysis can cause bloat, and the inability to urinate or defecate. Cows often tuck their heads into their flanks.

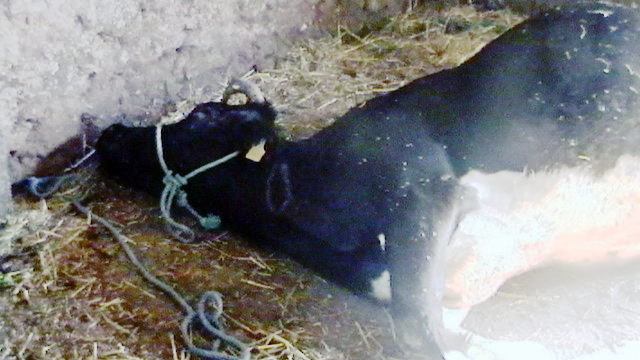
Cow lying on its side (lateral recumbency)

=== Stage 3 ===
In this stage, lateral recumbency, muscle flaccidity, unresponsiveness to stimuli, and loss of consciousness progressing to coma are observed. Heart rate can approach 120 bpm, with peripheral pulses becoming undetectable. If untreated, progression will continue to death.

== Cause ==
During the dry period (late gestation, non-lactating), dairy cattle have relatively low calcium requirements, with a need to replace approximately 30 g of calcium per day due to utilization for fetal growth and fecal and urinary losses. At birth, the requirement for calcium is greatly increased due to initiation of lactation, when mammary drainage of calcium may exceed 50 g per day. Due to this large increase in demand for calcium, most cows will experience some degree of hypocalcemia for a short period following birth as the metabolism adjusts to the increased demand. When the mammary drain of plasma calcium causes hypocalcemia severe enough to compromise neuromuscular function, the cow is considered to have clinical milk fever.

== Mechanism ==
In normal calcium regulation, a decrease in plasma calcium levels causes the parathyroid glands to secrete parathyroid hormone (PTH), which regulates the activation of vitamin D_{3} in the kidney. These two compounds act to increase blood calcium levels by increasing absorption of dietary calcium from the intestine, increasing renal tubular reabsorption of calcium in the kidney, and increasing resorption of calcium from bones.

It has been found that tissue is less responsive to PTH prepartum, compared to postpartum. It is believed that hypocalcemia causing milk fever is due to a lower level of responsiveness of the cow's tissues to circulating parathyroid hormone.

The resultant decreased plasma calcium causes hyperexcitability of the nervous system and weakened muscle contractions, which result in both tetany and paresis.

== Prevention ==
=== Diet ===
Proper dietary management will prevent most cases of milk fever. This generally involves close attention to mineral and fiber levels in the diet prior to calving, as well as improving cow comfort to eliminate other problems that may interfere with appetite (and so trigger hypocalcemia). General advice is to restrict calcium intake before calving, as this leads to the parathyroid gland stimulating the release of calcium from bones.

=== Calcium salts ===
A synthetic analogue of 25-hydroxycholecalciferol can be given by injection in the days leading up to calving, although the timing of this prophylaxis makes it difficult to use.

Oral administration of a dose of a calcium salt in a gel has been advised by some veterinarians. An orally administered bolus containing a much higher concentration of calcium than the injectable solutions can also be given so long as the cow is standing or sitting up. If the cow is lying 'flat out' then immediate intravenous therapy is required to avoid death.

== Treatment ==
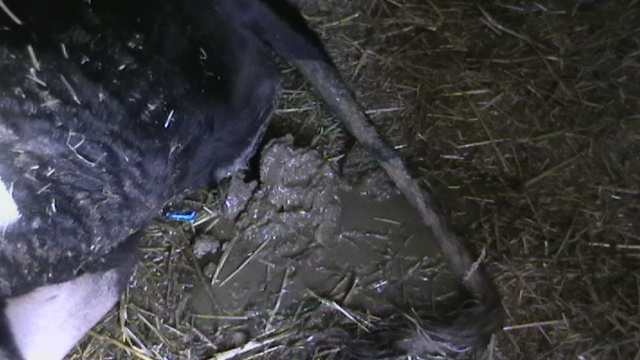
Urination and defecation commonly occurring during calcium treatment

Treatment generally involves calcium injection by intravenous, intramuscular or subcutaneous routes. Before calcium injection was employed, treatment comprised inflation of the udder using a pneumatic pump. Inflation of the udder worked because the increased pressure created in the udder pushed the calcium in the udder back into the bloodstream of the cow.

Intravenous calcium, though indicated in many cases, is potentially fatal through "heart blockade", or transient high calcium levels stopping the heart, so should be administered with care. Cows are to be fed jaggery along with the lime water mixture. In unclear cases of downer cows, intravenous calcium injection can lead to diagnosis. The typical reaction will be a generalized tremor of the skeletal muscles, and sometimes cardiac arrhythmia. Defecation, urination and eructation are frequent during the treatment, due to pharmacological effect of calcium on the smooth muscles.

== Prognosis ==
The prognosis is generally good, even in advanced cases. However, some cows can relapse the following day, and even a third time the day after. Without treatment, between 60% and 80% of cows usually die, although death rates as high as 90% have been recorded.

== History ==
It is thought that milk fever has existed for a very long time in dairy cattle. The first reports in veterinary literature can be traced to around 1793.

=== Early theories ===
Early treatments involved venesection, but this proved ineffective.

==== Potassium iodide ====
In the late 1800s, Jurgens Schmidt proposed the use of an infused solution of potassium iodide for treatment. A follow-up study of this treatment by Danish veterinarians showed that 90% of cows recovered after use of the treatment, compared with only 20-40% survival without. A study in Iowa showed that 76.5% of cows recovered after use of the treatment. However, the premise of the Schmidt treatment was misleading, as later veterinarians used water alone to the same success rate.

==== Udder inflation ====
In 1901, Anderson and Evers trialled a treatment of udder inflation with air, which reduced mortality rates to just 1%. although with the added complication of mastitis. Although this was an effective treatment (and is still used as a backup today), it was not understood at the time why it worked, and remains the source of some debate. Some scientists believed that udder inflation could cause stimulation that then prevents calcium loss. Other scientists suggested that udder inflation prevented milk secretion, reducing calcium loss overall. This may prevent calcium being taken from the blood plasma.

=== Later theories ===
The true cause of milk fever was first suggested by Prof John Russell Greig and Henry Dryerre in March 1925, at the Moredun Research Institute in Scotland. This idea was later confirmed experimentally by Little and Wright in May 1925. By 1933, Pulles began treatments with magnesium chloride and calcium chloride, which is the basis for modern pharmaceutical treatments.
