= Bridget McConnell =

Scottish cultural administrator (born 1958)

Lady McConnell of Glenscorrodale
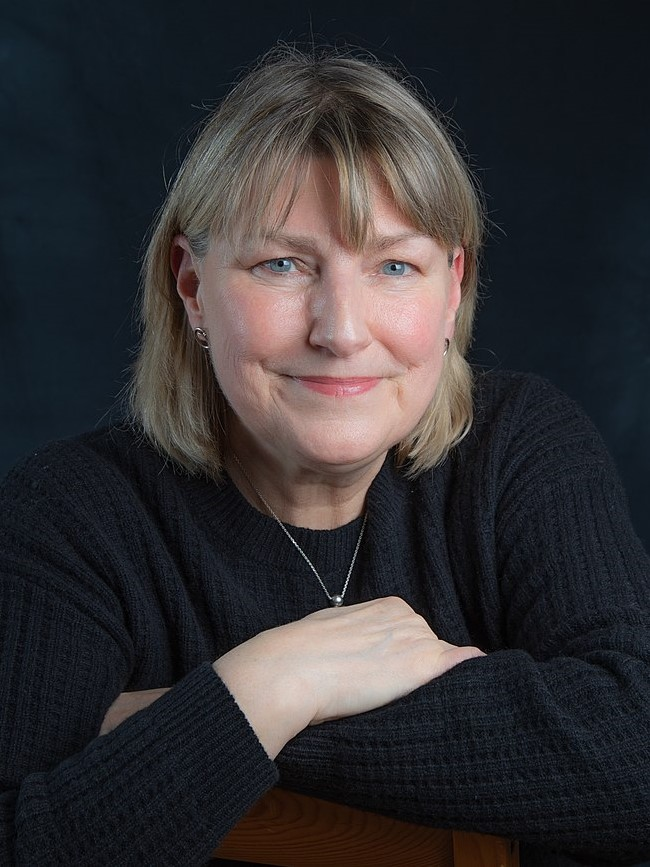
- Official portrait, 2022
- Born: Bridget Mary McLuckie; 28 May 1958 (age 68); Glasgow, Scotland
- Education: University of St Andrews; Dundee College of Commerce; Stirling University
- Spouse(s): Richard Brown (until 1987) Jack McConnell (m. 1990)

Bridget Mary McConnell, Lady McConnell of Glenscorrodale, CBE (née McLuckie; born 28 May 1958) is a Scottish public sector administrator specialising in the arts. She was from 2007 to 2022 the chief executive officer of Glasgow Life, the charity and arm's-length body responsible for delivering culture and sport in Glasgow. McConnell participated in Glasgow's successful bid for the 2014 Commonwealth Games, serving as a member of the organising committee and as the Director of Ceremonies and Culture, while overseeing infrastructure required for the games. McConnell was responsible for a major overhaul of the city's sports, leisure, arts and cultural facilities.

Since 2022, McConnell has been a non-executive member of a number of arts related boards in Scotland. McConnell is married to former First Minister of Scotland Jack McConnell.

== Education and career ==
McConnell was educated at Our Lady's High School, Cumbernauld, going on to graduate from St Andrews University (MA hons, 1982), Dundee College of Commerce (DIA 1983) and Stirling University (MEd, 1992; EdD, 2009). McConnell worked as the first curator of a local authority travelling art gallery with Fife County Council in 1983, then taking up the first ever jointly funded Local Authority/Scottish Arts Council Arts Officer post in Stirling District Council in 1984, followed by ten years in Fife Council firstly as Principal Arts Officer then Arts, Libraries, Museums and Recreation Manager. She joined Glasgow City Council in 1998 as Director of Cultural and Leisure Services.

As CEO, McConnell oversaw an annual budget of c.£108 million and leading a staff of 2,600 people working across nearly 100 culture and sport facilities, events and festivals. She served a number of national committees and boards, including Unboxed2022, Carnegie Trust for the Universities of Scotland, and Arts and Business Scotland.

=== Glasgow Life ===
During the COVID pandemic, McConnell oversaw the redesign of the organisation, advocating for its role in the economic and social recovery of the city, as well as chairing the Health and Wellbeing group of the National Events Industry Advisory Group (Member) set up by the Scottish Government to give advice during the pandemic and in recovery planning.

=== Projects ===
McConnell has overseen multiple major infrastructure projects, including the £35 million refurbishment of Kelvingrove Art Gallery and Museum (2006), an upgrade of the Mitchell Library, the £74 million Zaha Hadid designed Riverside Museum (2012), which was named European museum of the year 2013, the £113 million Emirates Arena and Sir Chris Hoy Velodrome (2012), £35 million phase 1 Kelvinhall development as a world class centre for heritage, learning, culture and sport (2015). The Burrell Collection, the c.£70 million project to refurbish and redisplay one of the world's finest single art collections, reopened in 2022.

=== Board memberships ===
McConnell was appointed as non-executive director of ScottishPower Renewables in 2022. She has been a Trustee of National Museums Scotland since 2023. McConnell has been a council member of the Arts and Humanities Research Council since 2022.

McConnell has been a trustee of Carnegie Trust for the Universities of Scotland since 2020. In 2022, she was appointed chair of the Hunterian Strategic Development Board at The Hunterian museum and art galleries in Glasgow.

== Personal life ==
While studying at University of St Andrews, McConnell met and later married musician Richard Brown, and they had a daughter and a son. They divorced in 1987. She married politician Jack McConnell in 1990, who would become First Minister of Scotland in 2001.

== Honours ==
McConnell was made a CBE in 2015 in recognition of Services to Culture.

She has been awarded four honorary doctorates: University of Aberdeen (DHC, 2008), University of St Andrews (DLitt, 2008), Royal Conservatoire of Scotland (DHC, 2013), and University of Glasgow (DUniv, 2014).

As a wife of a peer, she is entitled to the courtesy style of Right Honorable and the courtesy title of Lady McConnell, but she does not use them in public.
