= Temporal lobe epilepsy =

Chronic focal seizure disorder

- Lobes of the brain. Temporal lobe in green
- Specialty: Neurology, Psychiatry

Temporal lobe epilepsy (TLE) is an enduring brain disorder that causes unprovoked seizures from the temporal lobe. Temporal lobe epilepsy is the most common type of focal onset epilepsy among adults. Seizure symptoms and behavior distinguish seizures arising from the mesial (medial) temporal lobe from seizures arising from the lateral (neocortical) temporal lobe. Memory and psychiatric comorbidities may occur. Diagnosis relies on electroencephalographic (EEG) and neuroimaging studies. Anticonvulsant medications, epilepsy surgery, and dietary treatments may improve seizure control.

== Types ==
Under the International League Against Epilepsy (ILAE) 2017 classification of the epilepsies, focal onset epilepsy occurs from seizures arising from a biological neural network within a single cerebral hemisphere. Temporal lobe epilepsy occurs from seizures arising within the lobe. It is the most common focal onset epilepsy, and 80% of temporal lobe epilepsy is mesial (medial) temporal lobe epilepsy, temporal lobe epilepsy arising from the inner (medial) part of the temporal lobe that may involve the hippocampus, parahippocampal gyrus, or amygdala. The less common lateral temporal lobe or neocortical temporal lobe seizures arise from the outer (lateral) temporal lobe. These types of TLE are very rare due to the genetic cause or lesions such as tumor, birth defect, or blood vessel abnormalities in the temporal lobe.

The ILAE 2017 classification distinguishes focal aware from focal impaired seizures. A focal aware temporal lobe seizure occurs if a person remains aware of what occurs during the entire seizure; awareness may be retained even if impaired responsiveness occurs during the seizure. A focal impaired awareness temporal lobe seizure occurs if a person becomes unaware during any part of the seizure.

Approximately 80% of seizures in the temporal lobe begin in the mesial temporal region, frequently starting in or around the hippocampus. The hippocampus, found in both temporal lobes, is essential for memory and learning.

== Signs and symptoms ==
=== Mesial temporal lobe epilepsy ===
During a temporal lobe seizure, a person may experience a seizure aura; an aura is an autonomic, cognitive, emotional, or sensory experience that commonly occurs during the beginning part of a seizure. The common mesial temporal lobe seizure auras include a rising epigastric feeling, abdominal discomfort, taste (gustatory), smell (olfactory), tingling (somatosensory), fear, déjà vu, jamais vu, flushing, or rapid heart rate (tachycardia). A person may then stare blankly, appear motionless (behavioral arrest) and lose awareness. Repeated stereotyped motor behaviors (automatisms) may occur; these include repeated swallowing, lip smacking, picking, fumbling, patting, or vocalizations. Dystonic posture is an unnatural stiffening of one arm occurring during a seizure. A dystonic posture on one side of the body commonly indicates seizure onset from the opposite side of the brain e.g. right arm dystonic posture arising from a left temporal lobe seizure. Impaired language function (dysphasia) during, or soon following, a seizure is more likely to occur when seizures arise from the language dominant side of the brain.

=== Lateral temporal lobe epilepsy ===
The common auras from seizures arising from the primary auditory cortex include vertigo, humming sounds, ringing sounds, buzzing sounds, songs or voices, or altered sensations. Lateral temporal lobe seizures arising from the temporal-parietal lobe junction may cause complex visual hallucinations. In comparison to mesial temporal lobe seizures, lateral temporal lobe seizures are briefer in duration, occur with earlier loss of awareness, and are more likely to become focal than bilateral tonic-clonic seizures. Impaired language function (dysphasia) during or soon following a seizure is more likely to occur when seizures arise from the language dominant side of the brain.

== Causes ==
Hippocampal sclerosis, brain tumor, traumatic brain injury, cerebral vascular malformation, neuronal migration disorders, infections such as encephalitis and meningitis, autoimmune disease (limbic encephalitis), and genetic disorders may cause temporal lobe epilepsy.

== Risk factors ==
Many persons with uncontrolled temporal lobe epilepsy had childhood febrile seizures. A brief febrile seizure only slightly increases the risk for developing nonfebrile seizures (also known as afebrile seizures). However, the prolonged seizure of febrile status epilepticus leads to a 9% risk for developing epilepsy. There is no clear relationship between febrile seizures and development of hippocampal sclerosis. Those who experienced any sort of brain injury in their early life have a higher risk of developing epilepsy.

== Mechanism ==
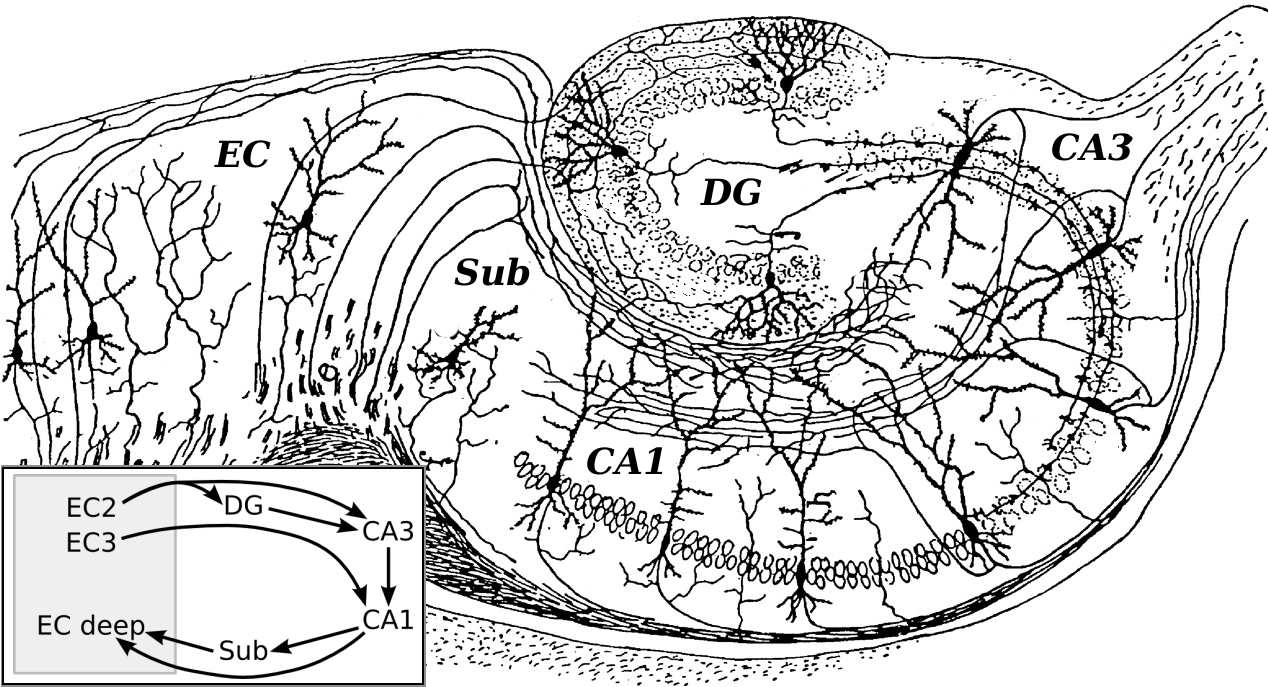
The neural circuit of the hippocampus shows the dentate gyrus (DG), subiculum (SB), entorhinal cortex (EC), CA1 sector, and CA3 sector.

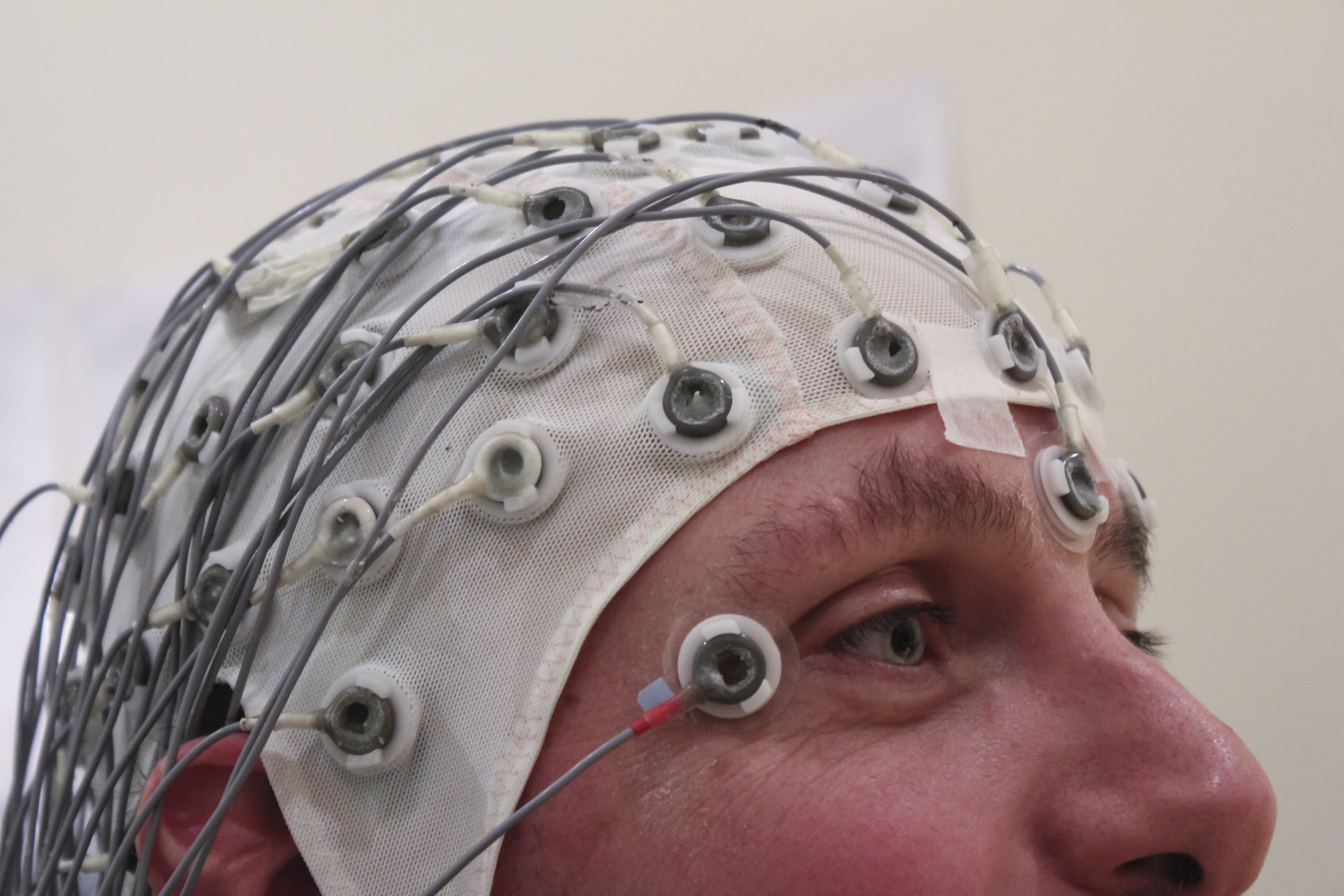
Scalp electrodes are placed to record an electroencephalogram.

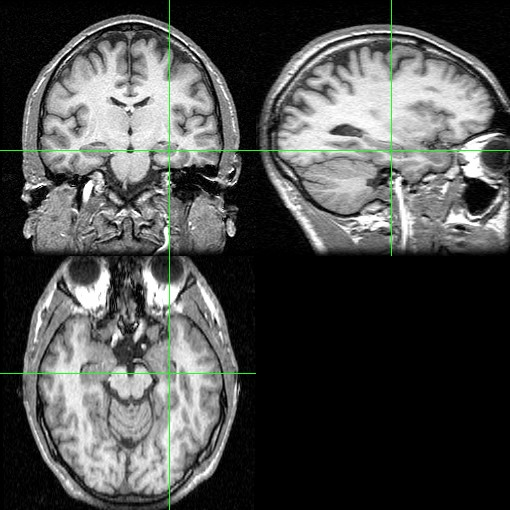
Brain MRI with hippocampus identified by cross hairs.

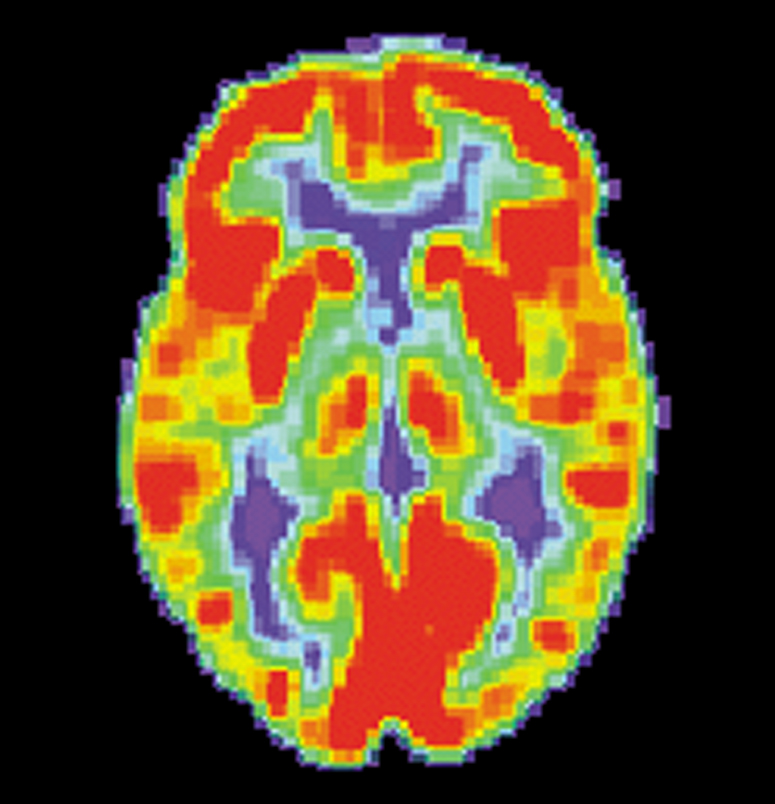
Brain positron emission tomography (PET) scan

=== Neuronal loss ===
Hippocampal sclerosis occurs with severe CA1 and less severe CA3 and CA4 neuronal loss. Experimental research has shown that N-methyl-d-aspartate (NMDA) receptor activation causes neuronal cell loss, and electrical stimulation-induced animal models of temporal lobe epilepsy duplicate the cell loss pattern of temporal lobe epilepsy in humans. Repetitive seizures irreversibly damage interneurons leading to persistent loss of recurrent inhibition. Damage of GABAergic interneurons lead to loss of inhibition, uncontrolled neuronal firing, leading to seizures. The secondary epileptogenesis hypothesis is that repetitive seizures lead to interneuron loss, loss of glutamatergic principal neurons, axonal sprouting, and formation of new recurrent glutamatergic excitatory circuits leading to a more severe epilepsy. Mechanisms related to neuronal loss incompletely account for temporal lobe epilepsy as temporal lobe epilepsy may occur with only minimal neuronal cell loss.

=== Neuron-specific type 2 K+/Cl− cotransporter (KCC2) mutation ===
This KCC2 mutation prevents subicular neurons from potassium and chloride ion extrusion, leading to intracellular chloride accumulation, and positive γ-Aminobutyric acid (GABA) mediated currents. Accumulated chloride efflux through GABA receptors leads to neuronal depolarization, increased neuronal excitability and ultimately seizures. Persons with this mutation have mesial temporal lobe epilepsy with hippocampal sclerosis.

=== Granule cell dispersion ===
Dentate gyrus granule cell dispersion refers to a granule cell layer that is widened, poorly demarcated, or accompanied by granule cells outside the layer (ectopic granule cells). In the normal brain, dentate granule cells block seizure spread from entorhinal cortex to the hippocampus. A hypothesis is that granule cell dispersion may disrupt the normal mossy fiber pathway connecting granule cells and CA3 pyramidal cells leading to mossy fiber sprouting and new excitatory networks capable of generating seizures. However, a study has shown that a similar pattern of granule cell dispersion may occur in persons without epilepsy.

=== Cortical developmental malformations ===
Focal cortical dysplasia is a brain malformation that may cause temporal lobe epilepsy. This malformation may cause abnormal cortical layers (dyslamination), occur with abnormal neurons (dysmorphic neurons, balloon cells) and may occur with a brain tumor or vascular malformation. An abnormality of the MTOR pathway leads to hyperexcitable glutamate mediated neurons leading to seizures.

== Diagnosis ==
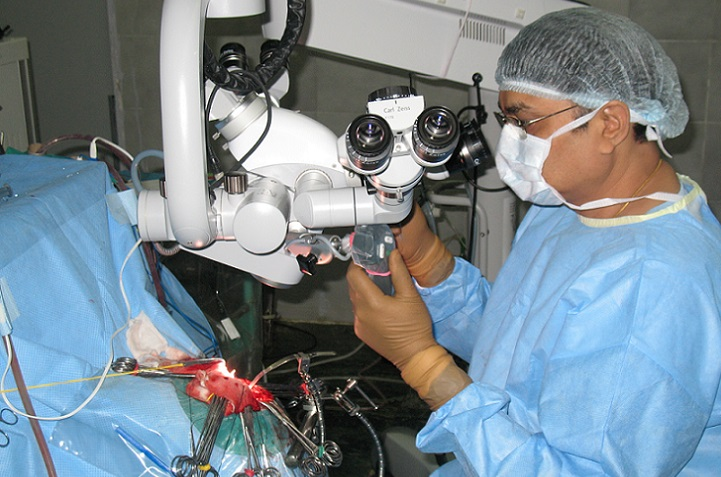
A surgeon performs epilepsy brain surgery.

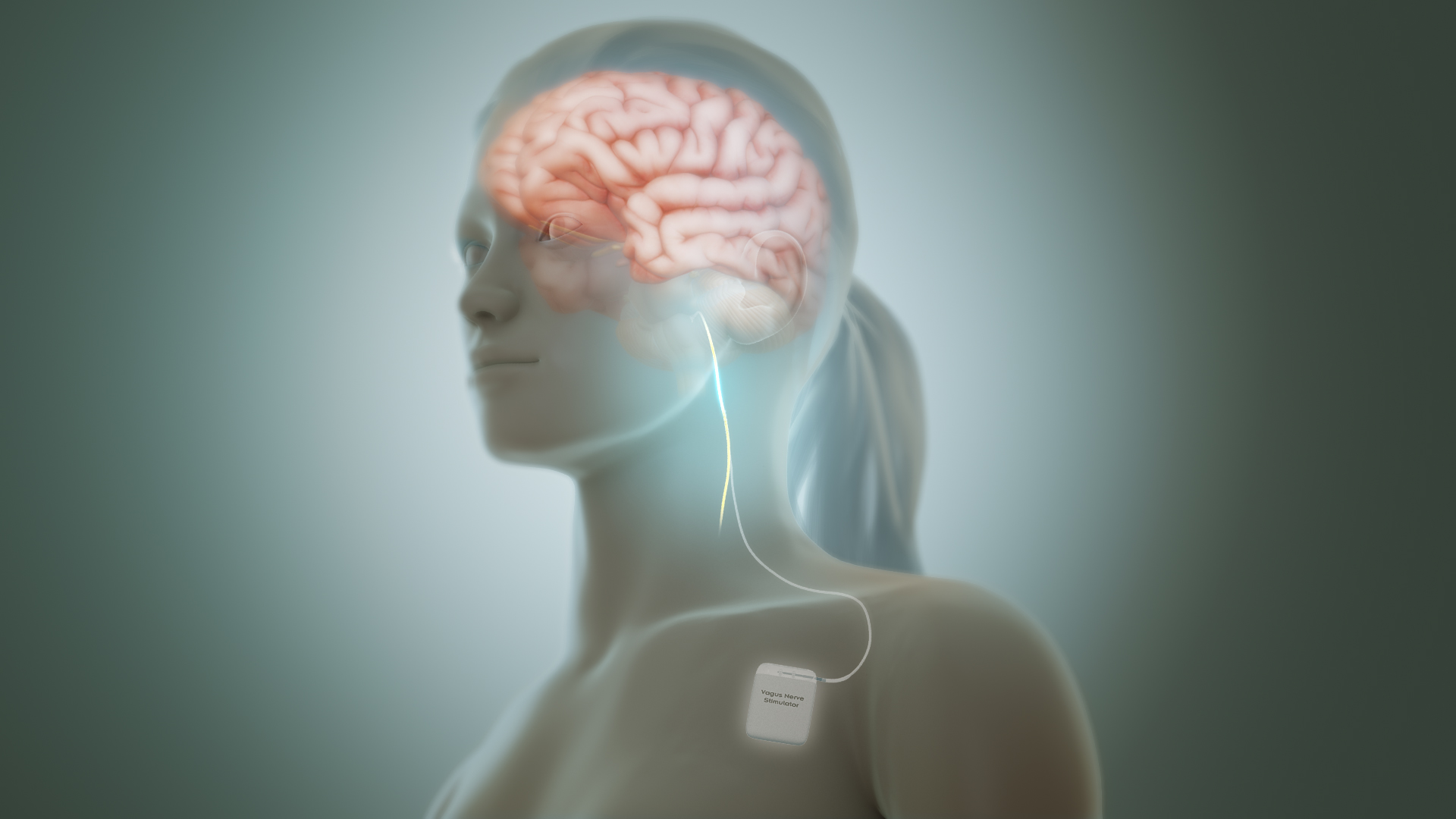
Vagus nerve stimulation

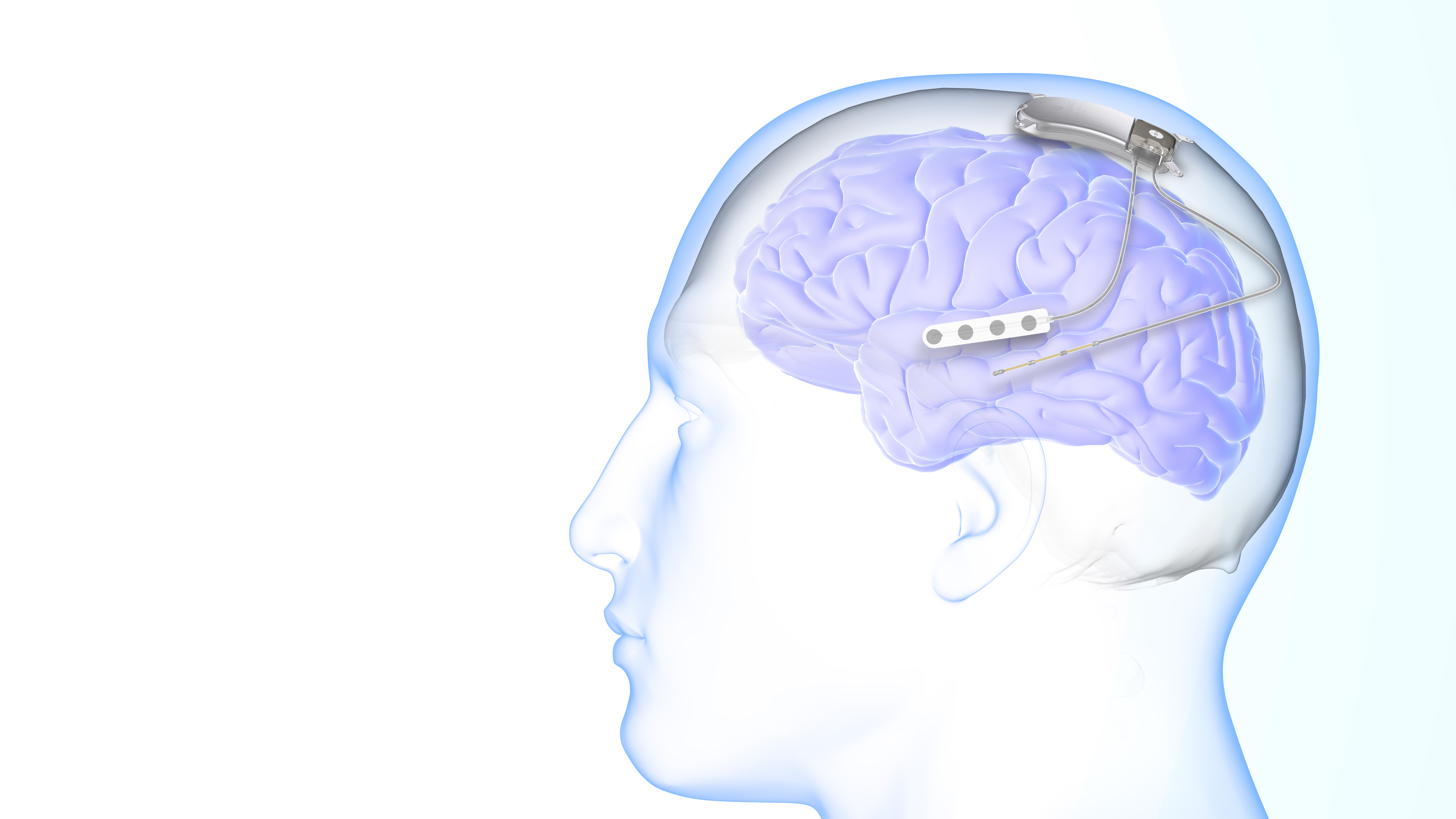
Responsive neurostimulation device

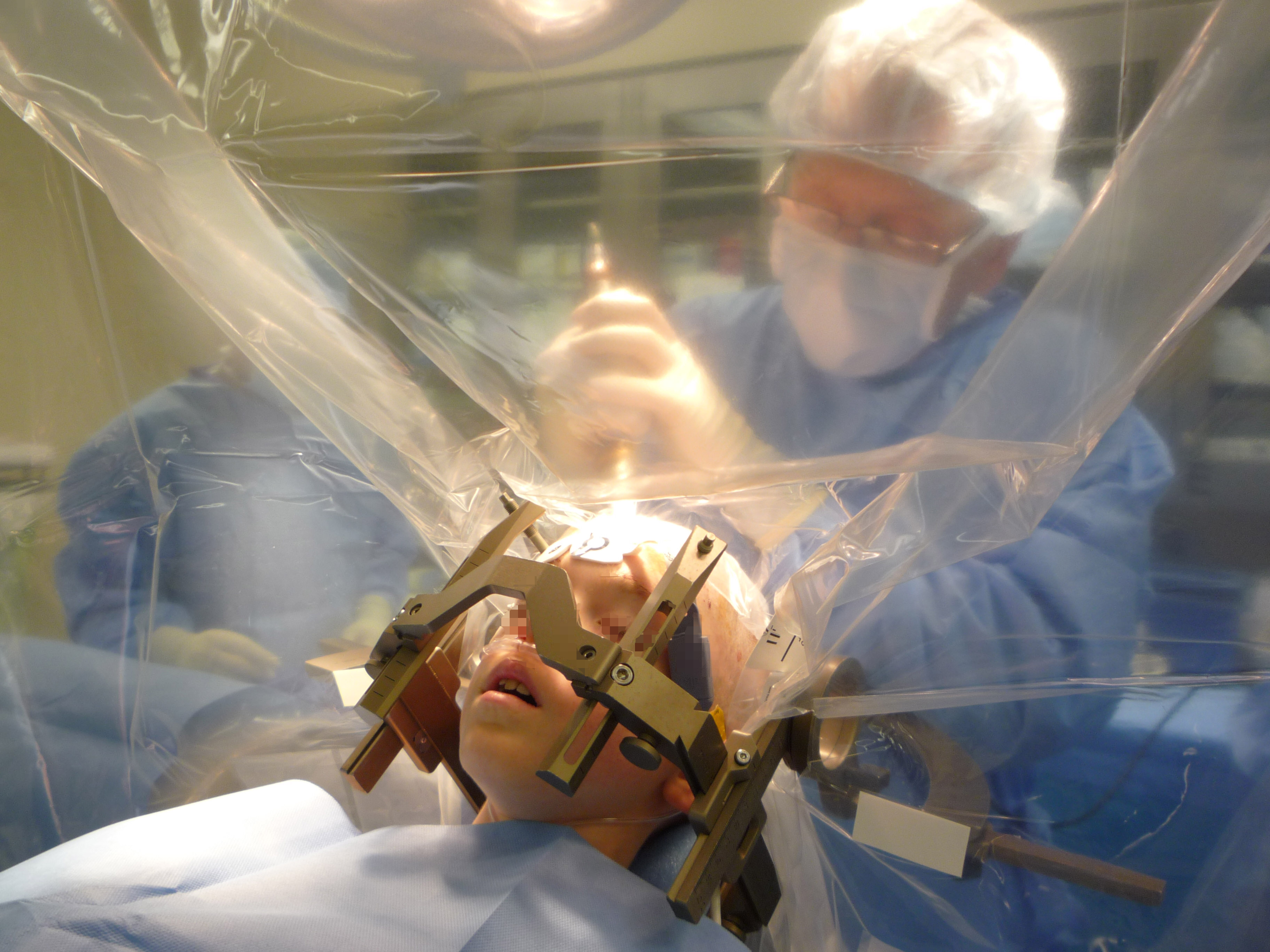
Surgeon implants a brain electrode for deep brain stimulation.

=== Electroencephalogram ===
The temporal lobe epileptiform discharge is a pattern seen on the electroencephalgram (EEG) test; temporal lobe epileptiform discharges occur between seizures and confirm the diagnosis of temporal lobe epilepsy. Long-term video-EEG monitoring may record the behavior and EEG during a seizure. Magnetoencephalography may diagnose temporal lobe epilepsy by recording epileptiform discharges or seizure patterns arising from the magnetic fields of neural electrical currents.

=== Neuroimaging ===
Neuroimaging tests may identify the cause for seizures and the seizure focus, the brain location where seizures begin. In newly diagnosed epilepsy, magnetic resonance imaging (MRI) can detect brain lesion in up to 12 to 14% of persons with epilepsy. However, for those with chronic epilepsy, MRI can detect brain lesion in 80% of the persons with epilepsy. 3-tesla MRI scan is advised for those with evidence of focal epilepsy such as temporal lobe epilepsy. Abnormalities identified by MRI scan include hippocampal sclerosis, focal cortical dysplasia, other cortical developmental brain malformations, developmental and low-grade tumors, cavernous hemangioma, hypoxic-ischemic brain injury, traumatic brain injury and encephalitis.

^{18}F-fluorodeoxyglucose (^{18}F-FDG) brain positron emission tomography (PET) may show a brain region of decreased glucose metabolism at a time between seizures; this hypometabolic region may correspond to the seizure focus, and PET scan is more sensitive for temporal lobe seizure focus localization compared to epilepsy arising from other brain lobes. Single-photon emission computed tomography (SPECT) may show a region of decreased blood flow occurring 40–60 seconds after injection during the seizure; this reduced blood flow region may correspond to the seizure focus.

Computed tomography (CT) scan is less sensitive than MRI scan for identifying small tumors, vascular malformations, cortical developmental brain malformations, and abnormalities in the mesial temporal lobe. CT scan is advised in emergencies when the suspected cause of epilepsy may be intracerebral hemorrhage, brain abscess, large cerebral infarction or subdural empyema. A person who requires neuroimaging but cannot have an MRI scan due to implanted devices such as a cardiac pacemaker, defibrillator or cochlear implant may receive a CT scan. CT scan may better demonstrate calcium containing brain abnormalities causing epilepsy such as in tuberous sclerosis and Sturge–Weber syndrome.

== Comorbidities ==
=== Memory ===
The major cognitive impairment in mesial temporal lobe epilepsy is a progressive memory impairment. This involves declarative memory impairment, including episodic memory and semantic memory, and is worse when medications fail to control seizures. Mesial temporal lobe epilepsy arising from the language dominant hemisphere impairs verbal memory, and mesial temporal lobe epilepsy arising from the language non-dominant hemisphere impairs nonverbal memory.

=== Psychiatric comorbidities ===
Psychiatric disorders are more common among those with epilepsy, and the highest prevalence occurs among those with temporal lobe epilepsy. The most common psychiatric comorbidity is major depressive disorder. Other disorders include post-traumatic stress disorder, generalized anxiety disorder, psychosis, obsessive–compulsive disorder, schizophrenia, bipolar disorder, substance use disorder, and a ~9% prevalence of suicidality.

=== Personality ===
Geschwind syndrome is a syndrome of altered sexuality (most often hyposexuality), religiosity, and compulsive or extensive writing and drawing occurring in persons with temporal lobe epilepsy. However, subsequent studies did not support the association of these behavioral traits with temporal lobe epilepsy. There are reports of religious behaviors occurring in persons with temporal lobe epilepsy.

== Treatment ==
=== Medical treatment ===
Anticonvulsant oral medications control seizures in about two-thirds of persons with epilepsy, and control commonly occurs with one or two medications.

=== Surgical treatment ===
Those with uncontrolled seizures despite treatment with multiple anticonvulsant medications have pharmacoresistant epilepsy, and they may require epilepsy surgery to achieve seizure control.

Penfield and Flanigan first described anterior temporal lobectomy, partial surgical removal of the temporal lobe, for treatment of mesial temporal lobe epilepsy in 1950. In a prospective randomized controlled trial comparing anterior temporal lobectomy to medical therapy for pharmacoresistant temporal lobe epilepsy, surgery was more effective than medical therapy with 1-year seizure free outcome occurring in 58% of persons with anterior temporal lobectomy compared to 8% of persons with drug treatment. Among those with intractable mesial temporal lobe epilepsy and hippocampal sclerosis, about 70% become seizure-free after epilepsy surgery. Studies show that language dominant anterior temporal lobectomy may lead to verbal memory decline. However, study outcomes are more variable on language non-dominant anterior temporal lobectomy leading to nonverbal memory decline.

Magnetic resonance-guided laser interstitial thermal therapy, stereotactic radiosurgery, and stereotactic radiofrequency ablation are surgical methods that treat epilepsy by destroying the abnormal brain tissue that causes seizures.

Neurostimulation may also improve seizure control. The vagus nerve stimulator (VNS) is surgically implanted in the chest, and delivers programmed electrical stimulation to the vagus nerve in the neck. The responsive neurostimulation device is implanted in the skull, monitors electrical brain activity for seizures, and responds to seizures with programmed electrical stimulation to one or two brain areas. Programmed deep brain stimulation of the anterior thalamic nucleus may treat seizures arising from more than 2 brain areas.

=== Dietary treatment ===
The ketogenic diet and modified Atkins diet are additional temporal lobe epilepsy treatment options.

== Remission ==
Among those who develop childhood temporal lobe epilepsy, epilepsy remits in about one-third of children. Remission was more likely among those without hippocampal sclerosis, brain tumor, or focal cortical dysplasia on MRI scan.

== See also ==
- Geschwind syndrome
- List of people with epilepsy
