= Thomas Bowie =

Thomas Bowie may refer to:

- Thomas Fielder Bowie (1808–1869), American politician
- Thomas Bowie (rugby union) (1889–1972), Scottish rugby union player
- Thomas Bowie (cricketer), Scottish cricketer and brewer
