= Jack McConnell =

Scottish politician (born 1960)

The Right Honourable The Lord McConnell of Glenscorrodale PC
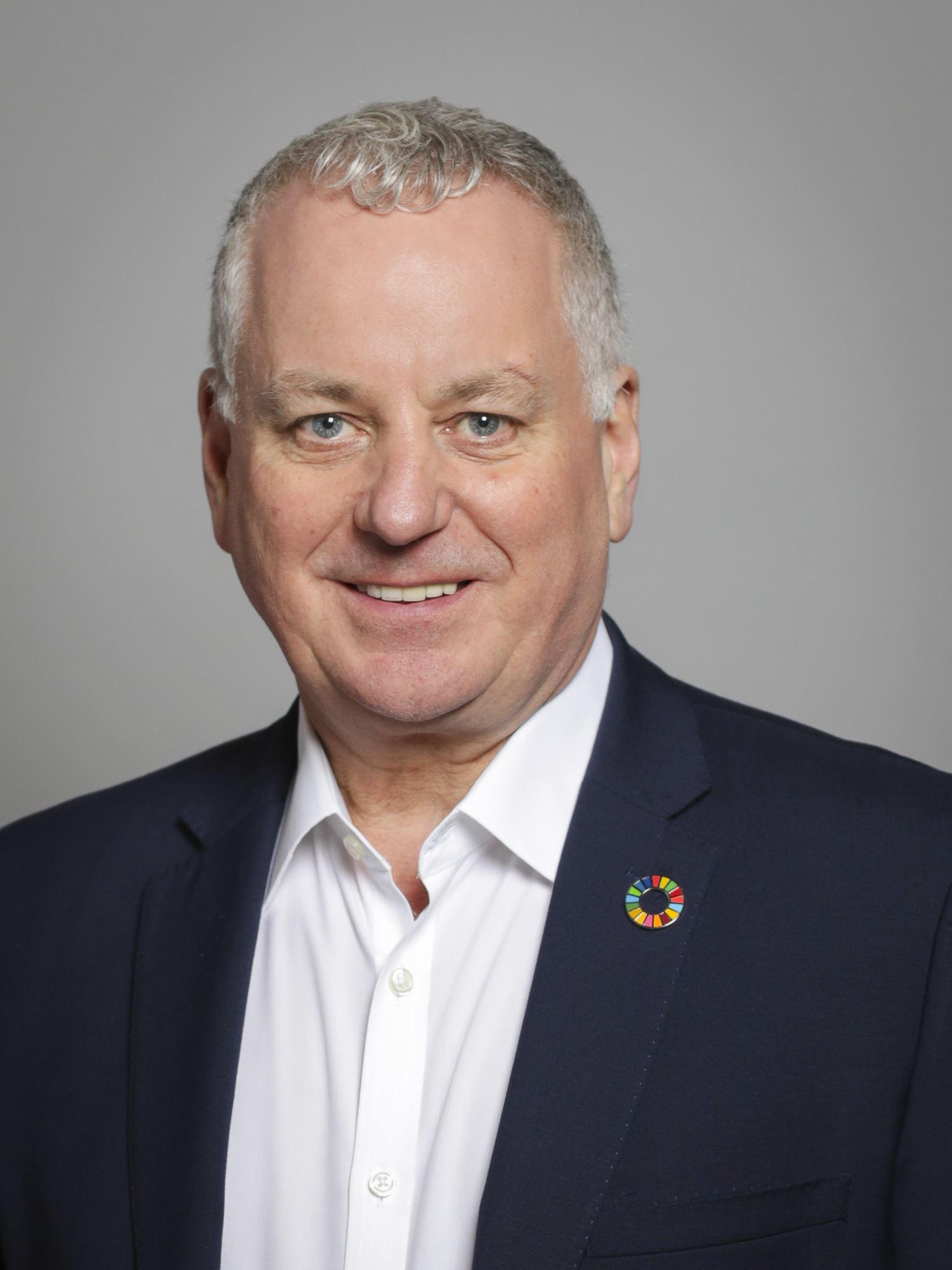
- Official portrait, 2019

First Minister of Scotland
- In office 27 November 2001 – 16 May 2007
- Monarch: Elizabeth II
- Deputy: Jim Wallace; Nicol Stephen
- Preceded by: Henry McLeish (Note: Jim Wallace acted from 8 November 2001 to 27 November 2001)
- Succeeded by: Alex Salmond

Leader of the Labour Party in Scotland
- In office 22 November 2001 – 15 August 2007
- Deputy: Cathy Jamieson
- UK party leader: Tony Blair; Gordon Brown
- Preceded by: Henry McLeish (Note: Cathy Jamieson acted from 8 November 2001 to 22 November 2001)
- Succeeded by: Wendy Alexander (Note: Cathy Jamieson acted from 15 August 2007 to 14 September 2007)
Ministerial offices
Minister for Education, Europe and External Affairs
In office 1 November 2000 – 22 November 2001
| First Minister | Henry McLeish |
| Preceded by | Sam Galbraith |
| Succeeded by | Cathy Jamieson |
Minister for Finance
In office 19 May 1999 – 1 November 2000
| First Minister | Donald Dewar; Jim Wallace (acting) |
| Preceded by | Position established |
| Succeeded by | Angus MacKay |
Parliamentary offices
Member of the House of Lords
Lord Temporal
Life peerage 28 June 2010
Member of the Scottish Parliament for Motherwell and Wishaw
In office 6 May 1999 – 22 March 2011
| Preceded by | Constituency established |
| Succeeded by | John Pentland |

Personal details
- Born: Jack Wilson McConnell; 30 June 1960 (age 66) Irvine, Ayrshire, Scotland
- Party: Scottish Labour
- Spouse: Bridget McConnell (m. 1990)
- Children: 2
- Education: University of Stirling
- Profession: Mathematics teacher
- Cabinet: First; second

Jack Wilson McConnell, Baron McConnell of Glenscorrodale, PC (born 30 June 1960) is a Scottish politician who served as First Minister of Scotland and Leader of the Labour Party in Scotland from 2001 to 2007. McConnell served as the Minister for Finance from 1999 to 2000 and Minister for Education, Europe and External Affairs from 2000 to 2001. He has been a Labour life peer in the House of Lords since 2010 and previously served as a Member of the Scottish Parliament (MSP) for Motherwell and Wishaw from 1999 to 2011. McConnell held the Presidency of the Conference of European Regions with Legislative Power (REGLEG) during November 2003 to November 2004.

Born in Irvine, Ayrshire, McConnell studied at the University of Stirling and worked as a mathematics teacher at Lornshill Academy. His political career began when he was elected to Stirling District Council, while he was still teaching. He served as a member of the Scottish Constitutional Convention, having campaigned in favour of a Scottish Parliament in the 1997 devolution referendum. Elected to serve as an MSP for the Motherwell and Wishaw constituency in the 1999 Scottish Parliament election, McConnell was appointed Minister for Finance under the Donald Dewar government. After Dewar's death in 2000, he ran unsuccessfully for the leadership of the Labour Party in Scotland, being defeated by Henry McLeish. McLeish appointed McConnell as Minister for Education, Europe and External Affairs.

In 2001, McLeish resigned in the aftermath of the Officegate scandal and McConnell was elected unopposed as the Scottish Labour leader. He was appointed First Minister on 22 November 2001, becoming the youngest holder of the office. As first minister he implemented a ban on smoking in public places, signed a Co-operation Agreement with Malawi, and successfully bid for the 2014 Commonwealth Games to be hosted in Glasgow. In the 2007 Scottish Parliament election, the Labour Party in Scotland became the second-largest party; the SNP had one seat more. This led to McConnell losing office, becoming the first (and as of 2025, only) First Minister to be defeated at an election, and as of 2025, the last Labour First Minister of Scotland in office.

After losing office as first minister, McConnell sat as leader of the largest opposition party in Holyrood, until his resignation as party leader. He sat as a backbencher and stood down as an MSP at the 2011 election. In 2010, McConnell became a member of the House of Lords of the United Kingdom. He made a commitment to continuing his work to tackle poverty in Africa and to develop the relationship between Scotland and Malawi.

== Early life and education ==
Jack Wilson McConnell was born on 30 June 1960 in Irvine, Ayrshire. He is the eldest of four children born to William Wilson McConnell (1937–2018) and Elizabeth McCallum McConnell (née Jack; 1936–2020). McConnell was brought up on Glenscorrodale Farm near Lamlash on the Isle of Arran, where his father was a sheep farmer and a member of the Arran Farmer’s Society. He was educated at Lamlash Primary and Arran High School.

McConnell attended the University of Stirling, where he was President of the Students' Association from 1980 to 1982 and National Union of Students Scotland Vice-President from 1982 to 1983. He met Margo MacDonald and Richard Leonard at university. In the late 1970s, he occupied the principal's office in protest against student homelessness. He also took part in a siege to occupy the administration offices at the university and slept in sleeping bags in the university’s court room. He graduated in 1983 with a B.Sc. Dip.Ed in Mathematics.

== Early career ==
After graduating, McConnell worked as a mathematics teacher at Lornshill Academy in Alloa, Clackmannanshire. In 1984, McConnell was elected to Stirling District Council, while still teaching at Lornshill. He served as Treasurer from 1988 until 1992, and was the Leader of the council from 1990 to 1992.

== Early political career ==
McConnell initially joined the Scottish National Party (SNP) when he was 16 years old. After trying to come to terms with Scottish nationalism, he suspended his membership and instead joined the Scottish Labour Party when he was 19.

From 1992 to 1998, McConnell served as the General Secretary of the Labour Party in Scotland. His major breakthrough was in his handling of the 1997 General Election success, where Labour attained a large overall majority victory over the Conservatives. Together the Labour Party in Scotland, the Scottish Liberal Democrats, and the Scottish National Party eliminated every seat the Conservatives held in Scotland. In 1998, he served as a member of the Scottish Constitutional Convention where he pioneered the Scottish devolution referendum success, establishing the Scottish Parliament.

As a strong proponent of Scottish devolution, McConnell helped push for reform. Between 1989 and 1998 he was a member of the Scottish Constitutional Convention, where he was playing an important role in the creation of the Scotland Act, which created a Scottish Parliament for the first time.

== Election to Holyrood (1999) ==
As General Secretary, he managed the Labour Party in Scotland's successful devolution referendum campaign in 1997. Following the successful devolution campaign and the creation of a Scottish Parliament, McConnell was elected as an MSP, for Motherwell and Wishaw, in the first Scottish Parliament in May 1999.

== In government (1999–2001) ==
=== Dewar government ===
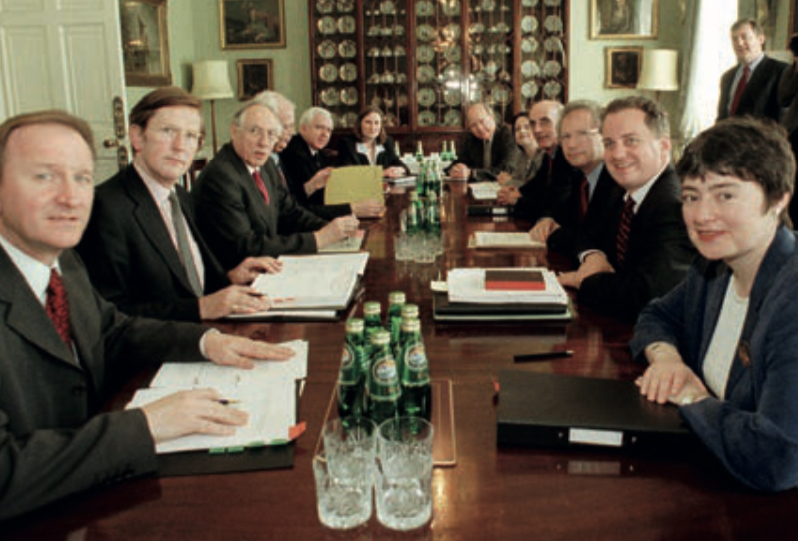
McConnell, seated second on the right, as a member of the Dewar administration, June 1999

McConnell was elected an MSP in the first Scottish Parliament elections in 1999. He was appointed Minister for Finance in the new Scottish Executive by then First Minister Donald Dewar. One of his first moves as Finance Minister was to establish the budgeting procedures for the new Scottish Executive, including publishing a consultation document asking the public and MSPs how the budget should be spent. His department also passed the Public Finance and Accountability (Scotland) Act 2000 through Parliament, which set out the finance and auditing procedures of the Executive. One of his primary jobs was to establish the budgeting procedures for the new Scottish government, which included consulting the public on budget priorities. As Minister responsible for External Relations he established Concordats with the UK Government and opened Scotland House in Brussels.

=== McLeish government ===
On 11 October 2000, Dewar died of a brain haemorrhage. After the Labour leadership intervened to stop the Enterprise Minister Henry McLeish being appointed Dewar's successor without a vote, McConnell stood in the leadership contest. The election was held on Saturday 21 October, only 72 hours after Dewar's funeral, and the surprise result saw McConnell defeated with 36 votes to McLeish's 44 votes.

McLeish appointed him Minister for Education, Europe and External Affairs. Some analysts considered this post to be a "poisoned chalice", as he would be required to resolve both a crisis in the Scottish Qualifications Authority over exam marking, and pay disputes with the teaching unions.

== Leadership of the Scottish Labour Party ==
McLeish resigned as first minister on 8 November 2001 over the Officegate scandal, regarding the sub let of his constituency office. McConnell was seen by many political analysts as the likely successor and he later launched his bid for leader. On 13 November, McConnell held a press conference in Edinburgh after reports emerged he had an extra-marital affair seven years prior. He admitted to having an affair and in a statement with his wife, Bridget McConnell, he stated: "If I become first minister, it would be very wrong for my family or anybody else to suffer because my behaviour then is still a secret today. That is why we are now being open about the fact that I did have an affair seven years ago. At the time I made mistakes, including denying the facts publicly and privately".

McConnell emerged as the only candidate and on 17 November, he was officially elected unopposed as Leader of the Labour Party in Scotland after receiving the support of 97.23% of MSPs. In his acceptance speech, he stated he was "deeply honoured to receive such overwhelming support" and highlighted that much work still needed to be done "to make devolution a success" and achieve "first class public services".

== First Minister of Scotland (2001–2007) ==
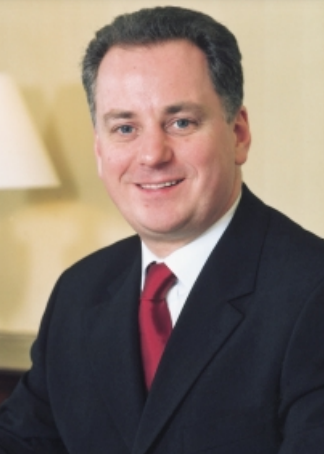
Official first minister portrait, 2001

=== First term; 2001–2003 ===
==== Nomination ====
McConnell was nominated for the post of First Minister by a vote of the Scottish Parliament on 22 November, defeating Scottish National Party leader John Swinney, Scottish Conservative leader David McLetchie and Independent MSP Dennis Canavan by 70 votes to 34, 19 and 3 respectively. On 27 November, the Queen issued him a Royal Warrant of Appointment and he was sworn in at the Court of Session in Edinburgh. As a result of him becoming First Minister, he was appointed Keeper of the Great Seal of Scotland and to the Privy Council, earning the title 'The Right Honourable' for life. McConnell continued to lead the Labour-Liberal Democrat coalition that had existed under the Dewar and McLeish administrations.

==== Cabinet appointments ====
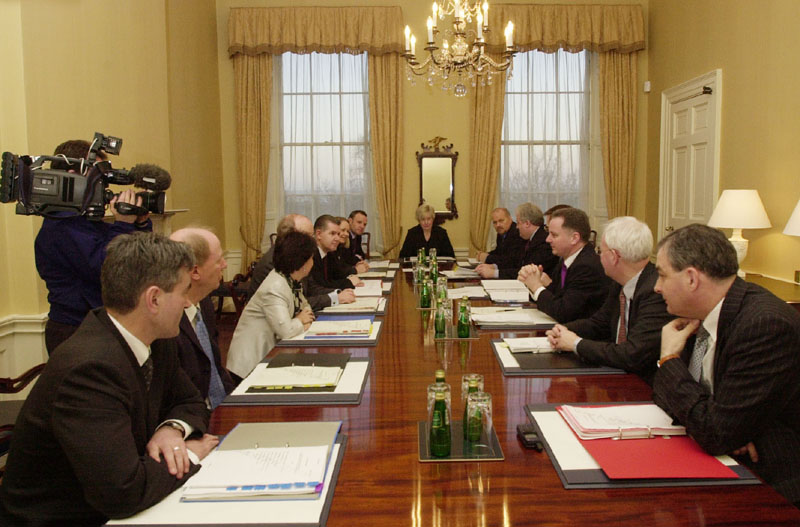
McConnell chairs the first meeting of his first government cabinet, December 2001

Shortly after being appointed McConnell began making appointments to his cabinet and announced his cabinet appointments on 27 November 2001. He announced his junior ministers later on the same day. Jim Wallace remained in the post of deputy first minister while Cathy Jamieson took over Mr McConnell's education brief and Wendy Alexander and Ross Finnie remained as ministers. Sam Galbraith and Angus MacKay stood down and Jackie Baillie, Sarah Boyack and Tom McCabe reshuffled out of government, while Susan Deacon was offered the post of social justice minister but refused the offer and moved to the backbenches. Cathy Jamieson, Mike Watson, Malcolm Chisholm, Iain Gray, Patricia Ferguson and Andy Kerr were all promoted to cabinet. Elish Angiolini QC was appointed as Solicitor General, the first woman to hold the role.

Following the appointment of his first government, McConnell used the first meeting of his newly formed cabinet that he intended for his administration to focus on the priorities of both the country and its people, pledging for unnecessary distractions to be avoided. Speaking during the first meeting of his cabinet, McConnell told his ministerial team he wished for them to "get rid of unnecessary paperwork and diversions" in order for ministers to be able to focus on the "key areas". McConnell also advised his cabinet that he was not seeking a large volume of new initiatives and policies for his administration, but rather that he remained committed to the policy areas of the previous administration. A spokesperson for the Scottish Executive said that McConnell had told his cabinet for the need to "focus on delivering what is already there" as he felt it was important that his administration "makes sure we are delivering on the targets that have been set".

One of the earliest announcements by the new executive under McConnell was the ability for the Scottish Parliament to raise or lower income tax by up to 3p in the pound would not be invoked under a McConnell administration. McConnell announced that under his premiership, the Scottish Executive would not change its position on issues such as private involvement in public services, proportional representation for local government elections and the financial independence of the Scottish Parliament.

In 2002, McConnell pledged that the Scottish Executive would commit to building 100 new schools across Scotland by 2006. In order to achieve this, McConnell advocated for the use of Public Private Partnerships (PPP), stating "we'll work together to sort out how we give people maximum return for every one of their pounds we are spending".

He was a strong advocate for teachers in Scotland to have the ability to move between primary and secondary schools to aid the transition process of children from primary school to secondary school. One of McConnell's spokesperson said that McConnell had been driven to implement policy changes on the backdrop of "children making the transition can have some problems. The first minister will be setting out the first steps towards addressing what is a problem that has been around for as long as we can remember".

In November 2002, McConnell announced plans that would allow Head Teachers in Scotland to have more authority in regards to setting their own standards and priorities for their respective schools.

==== Sporting event bids ====
In February 2002, Scotland joined forces with the Republic of Ireland in a bid to host the 2008 European Football Championship. Whilst he was initially unconvinced that it was worth spending around £100 million on the tournament, he later put his support behind the joint bid with the Republic of Ireland to host the tournament.

Although the bid lost out to Austrian and Switzerland joint bid, McConnell later supported other attempts to land major supporting events including London's successful bid for the 2012 Olympic Games and Glasgow's bid for the 2014 Commonwealth Games. In December 2005, Glasgow formally launched its candidacy to host the 2014 Commonwealth Games. The launch of the bid was attended by McConnell alongside the leader of Glasgow City Council Steven Purcell at Hampden Park. Speaking at the launch, McConnell acknowledged that Scotland was the "first country to declare its interest in hosting the games" and additionally was the "first country to nominate its preferred city". Glasgow was selected by Commonwealth Games Scotland over Edinburgh, who had previously hosted the 1970 and 1986 edition of the games.

==== Sectarianism ====
In December 2002, McConnell launched his government's campaign against sectarianism.

=== Second term; 2003–2007 ===
==== Re–election ====
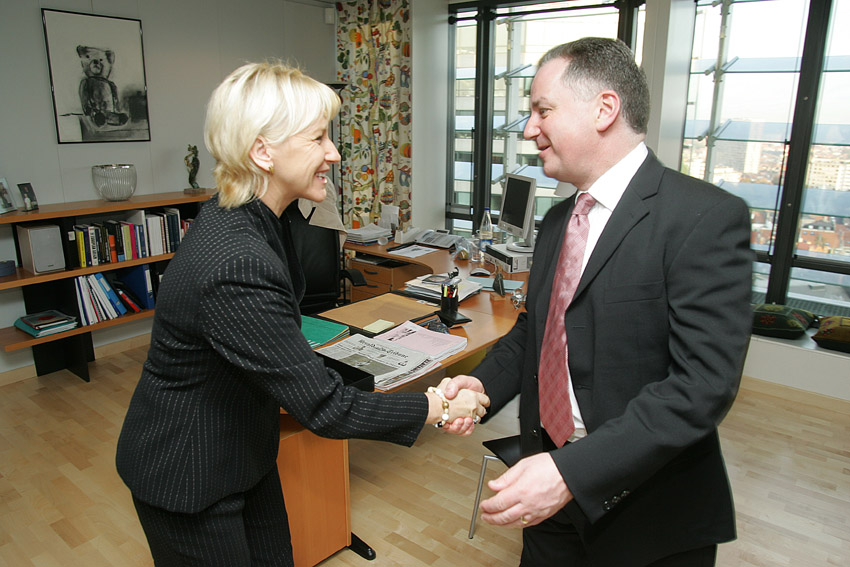
McConnell meets Vice-President of the European Commission, Margot Wallström, October 2005

McConnell was re elected MSP for Motherwell and Wishaw at the Scottish Parliament elections. The Labour Party in Scotland won 50 seats, the largest number, and formed another coalition government with the Liberal Democrats which won 17 seats. On 15 May, McConnell was re appointed First Minister of Scotland and on the same day the Scottish government published A Partnership for a Better Scotland which set out the government's priorities for the four-year term ahead.

This was followed by the “Fresh Talent initiative” which was created and developed to focus at addressing the demographic decline in Scotland and ageing Scottish population by attracting young and skilled immigrants, primarily from other European Union countries (such as Poland and Slovakia primarily) to be attracted to Scotland as a place to live and work.

==== Public smoking ban ====
One of McConnell's most significant pieces of legislation to be introduced to the Scottish Parliament under his premiership was the successful campaign to ban smoking in Scottish public places, such as pubs, public transport and restaurants, making Scotland the first country within the United Kingdom to do so, which led to McConnell receiving praise for his leadership on this issue, ultimately leading other countries to follow.

The Smoking, Health and Social Care (Scotland) Act 2005 was formally ratified in Scots law on 26 March 2006.

==== 31st G8 summit ====
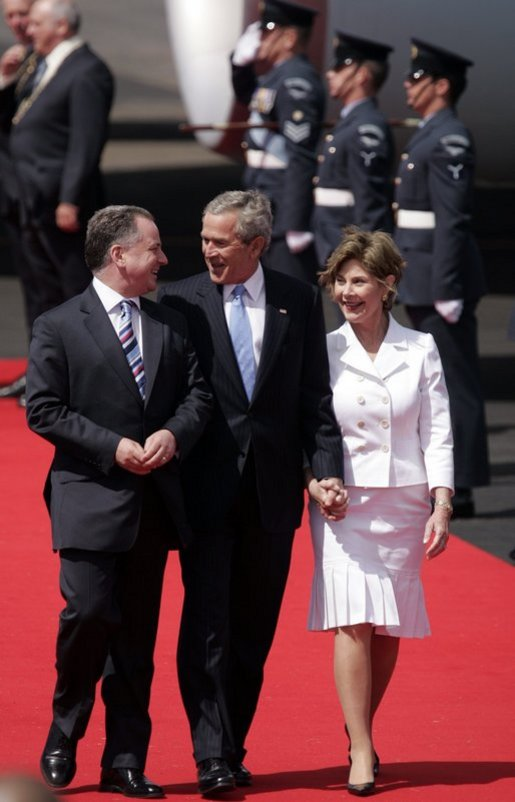
McConnell greets the US President, George W. Bush, and the first lady, Laura Bush, at Prestwick Airport, 2005

As the United Kingdom, and ultimately Scotland, was scheduled to host the 31st G8 summit at the Gleneagles Hotel, McConnell expressed his wish for the UK Government to pay for any and all associated costs as a result of hosting the summit and claimed that the Scottish Executive was being placed in an "intolerable position". Under McConnell, the executive warned that it would make the costs of security and policing the event public.

McConnell's demands for the UK Government to pay the costs of policing and security were met with opposition from HM Treasury, and it was later revealed that the treasury provided only £20 million towards the cost. In the months prior to the summit, the Scottish Executive expressed their concerns over the associated costs of hosting the event and a "potentially very serious situation" due to the fact that costs associated with the summit "would inevitably be in the public domain". It was suggested that the Scottish Executive would launch a formal dispute with the UK Government in response to any perceived lack of progress over funding the summit.

Despite assurances to the Scottish Parliament in May 2005 that the cost of hosting the G8 summit "would be nowhere near £100 million", overall cost of hosting the event was estimated to be £90.9 million. In addition to the £20 million contributed by HM Treasury, the Foreign Office contributed £10 million whilst the Scottish Executive was expected to pay the remaining £65 million.

Despite concerns over the cost and disagreement with the UK Government over funding, McConnell attended the summit held between 6–8 July 2005 and welcomed international leaders who were invited to the conference to Glasgow Prestwick Airport on arrival.

==== 2007 Scottish election ====
The Scottish Parliament general election of 3 May 2007 saw McConnell re elected as the MSP for Motherwell and Wishaw with a majority of 5,938 votes, representing 48% of the vote with a turnout of 50.3%. The Labour Party in Scotland was defeated by the SNP with the SNP winning 47 seats to Labour's 46, leaving the SNP short of an overall majority in the Parliament.

== Post premiership ==
=== Labour in opposition; 2007–2011 ===
==== Opposition leader ====
As Labour was left the second largest party in Holyrood, the SNP was invited first to form a government. The Lib Dems turned down a coalition deal with the SNP and Scottish Greens and ruled out a deal with Labour. On 16 May 2007, the election to nominate a first minister in the Scottish Parliament was held, with Alex Salmond receiving 49 votes to 46, as the Lib Dems and Conservatives abstained. The following day, the SNP officially formed the first nationalist administration of the Scottish Executive and McConnell became leader of the largest opposition party in parliament.

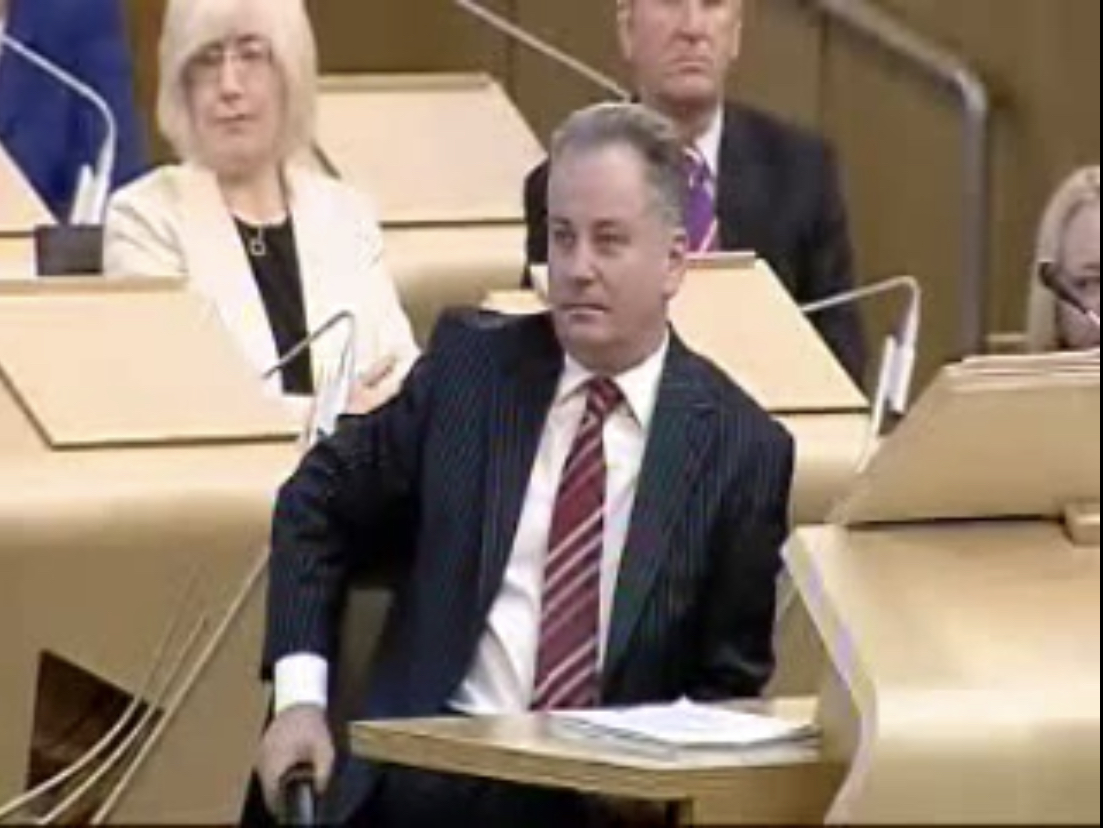
McConnell in opposition listening to Alex Salmond's acceptance speech, May 2007

On 17 May 2007, McConnell told Salmond he would abstain in a Parliament vote to appoint ministers. In his first speech as opposition leader, McConnell listed a series of 'hypocritical' remarks that SNP ministers had made about the Labour administration.

My predecessor had problems over a muddle. I can only describe Mr Salmond's first decisions as a guddle. He has learned nothing in opposition, despite what he said about doing so. He will regret deprioritising culture, sport and housing, but those who value them will regret it more. Those who want to see action on affordable homes will regret it too.

— McConnell's response to Alex Salmond's administration

During his time in opposition, McConnell took part in First Minister's Questions (FMQs). In one session of FMQs, he claimed the new SNP administration was making several U-turns on transport policy and its position on student debt and council taxes.

==== Resignation as leader ====
On 15 August 2007, McConnell announced his intention to resign as Leader of the Labour Party in Scotland. In a statement, he said it was his "honour" to serve as leader and empthasised the need for Labour to learn lessons following its defeat in May. Immediately after his resignation, he was nominated by Prime Minister Gordon Brown to succeed Richard Wildash as British High Commissioner to Malawi. McConnell was succeeded as leader by Wendy Alexander.

==== Backbench MSP ====
After his resignation, McConnell sat in Labour's opposition backbenches at Holyrood and continued to represent his Motherwell and Wishaw constituency until the 2011 Scottish Parliament election. On 28 May 2010, it was announced that McConnell would be made a life peer and enter the House of Lords as a working peer on behalf of the Labour Party.

=== House of Lords; 2010–present ===
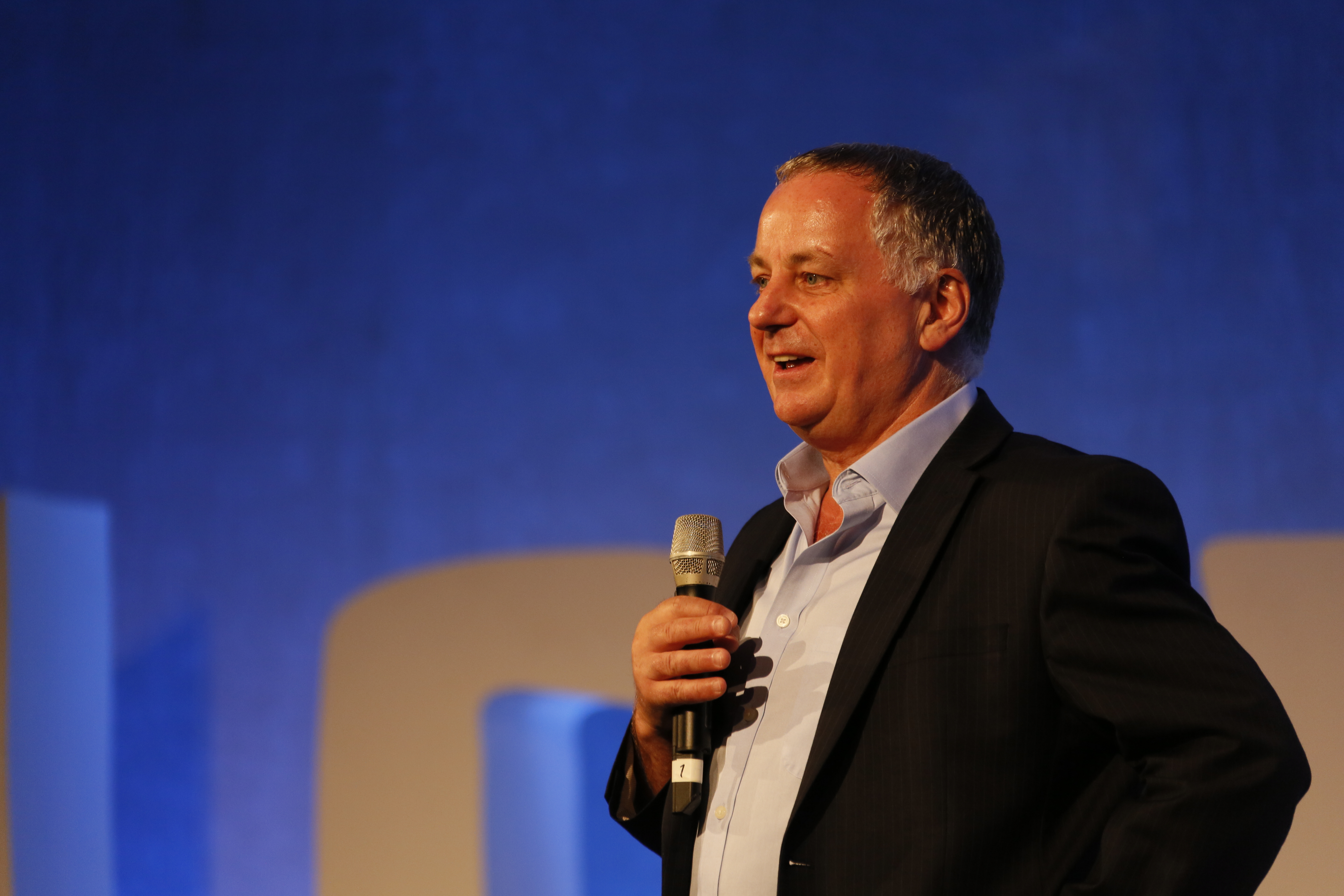
Lord McConnell speaking at the Girls Education Forum, 2016

On 28 June 2010, he was created a life peer as Baron McConnell of Glenscorrodale, of the Isle of Arran in Ayrshire and Arran, and was introduced in the House of Lords the same day. In August 2010 he announced that he would not be seeking re-election to the Scottish Parliament.

=== Other positions ===
In August 2007, he was appointed an adviser to the Clinton Hunter Development Initiative in Malawi and Rwanda, and in October 2008, he was appointed by Gordon Brown as the Prime Minister's Special Representative on Conflict Resolution Mechanisms, a position which ceased following Labour's defeat in the 2010 General election.

He is a UK Ambassador for Action for Children; a Fellow of the 48 Group Club, which promotes relationships between the United Kingdom and China and an Ambassador for Pump Aid. On 8 March 2012, Optical Express announced the appointment of Lord McConnell of Glenscorrodale joining the Board as non executive director. He was a non executive director at DCM (Optical Holdings) from 2011 to 2015. As of 30 November 2018, McConnell holds the position of Chancellor at the University of Stirling.

On 31 October 2024, it was announced that McConnell would lead a Black Sea regeneration group.

== Personal life ==
In 1990, McConnell married Bridget McConnell, a cultural administrator and former chief executive officer of Glasgow Life. They met in the late 1980s, where they both worked at Stirling District Council. On 5 March 1991, a sheriff ruled McConnell could become the legal father of Bridget's children, Hannah and Mark; whom she had in her previous marriage with Richard Brown. During McConnell's leadership bid for the Scottish Labour Party in November 2001, he revealed in a press conference that he had been involved in an extra marital affair seven years previously. He admitted the affair had been "an open secret for seven years" and "It caused significant hurt to a number of people and I regret that very much to this day".

In 2016, McConnell refused to bail out his sister, Anne McConnell, who was jailed for stealing £9,000 from a disabled pensioner's bank account. She told police she needed money to pay her mortgage and blamed her crime on her menopause and hoped "Jack would help her pay it back".

== See also ==
- Politics of Scotland
- Premiership of Jack McConnell
- First McConnell government
- Second McConnell government

== Sources ==
- Davidson, Lorraine. Lucky Jack: Scotland's First Minister (2005), Black and White Publishing.

Scottish Parliament
| New parliament Scotland Act 1998 | Member of the Scottish Parliament for Motherwell and Wishaw; 1999–2011 | Succeeded by John Pentland |
Political offices
| New office | Minister for Finance; 1999–2000 | Succeeded by Angus MacKay as Minister for Finance and Local Government |
| Preceded by Sam Galbraith as Minister for Children and Education | Minister for Education, Europe and External Affairs; 2000–2001 | Succeeded by Cathy Jamieson as Minister for Education and Young People |
| Preceded by Jim Wallace; Acting | First Minister of Scotland; 2001–2007 | Succeeded by Alex Salmond |
Party political offices
| Preceded by Henry McLeish | Leader of the Labour Party in Scotland; 2001–2007 | Succeeded by Wendy Alexander |
Orders of precedence in the United Kingdom
| Preceded by The Lord Boateng | Gentlemen; Baron McConnell of Glenscorrodale | Followed by The Lord Touhig |
