= Margaret Duchill =

Scottish woman executed for witchcraft in 1658

- Died: 1 June 1658 (in Julian calendar)

Margaret Duchill (died 1658) was a Scottish woman who confessed to witchcraft at Alloa during the year 1658. She was implicated by others and she named other women. She was executed on 1 June 1658.

== Life ==
Duchill's early life is unknown before she confessed. She was one of several people who were accused of witchcraft during the trials of the Alloa witches between 1658 and 1659. The Alloa witch hunt began when the presbytery of Stirling met and appointed the Reverends Matthias Symson (1625–1664) and George Bennet, to visit the town and investigate a group of suspected witches. Duchill was one of these woman who were investigated, and her case is a prime example of how an accused witch could bring other people into suspicion, as Duchill implicated other women in the town as witches which fueled the witch hunting frenzy. She implicated Elizabeth (Bessie Paton) who she said was the leader of the group. In turn at her trial on 22 June 1658 she implicated Katherine Remy and Margaret Talzeor. There were a total of 12 women accused of witchcraft from the urban parish, which may include Alloa's adjacent rural area.

Not much is known about her life before her trial, however her socioeconomic status was described as middling, and she is known to have been a resident of Alloa. Her trial testimony involved mentions of demons, fairies and elements of maleficium.

== Trial ==
Duchill was imprisoned in the month of May 1658 and interrogated. On the 11th of May her confession was read out during a kirk session. She had confessed to having been a servant of the devil for twenty years.

Duchill was burnt on 1 June 1658.
