= Henry Dryerre =

Scottish veterinarian and animal physiologist

Prof Henry Dryerre FRSE MRCS LRCP (1881–5 February 1959) was a Scottish veterinarian and animal physiologist. He was Emeritus Professor of Physiology at the Dick Veterinary College in Edinburgh. The Carnegie Trust for the Universities of Scotland administer a bursary known as the Henry Dryerre Scholarship which is named in his honour. Due to his lineage he is sometimes referred to as Henry Dryerre IV.

== Life ==
He was born in Blairgowrie in 1881 the son of Jessie Meldrum (died 1903) and her husband, Henry Dryerre (born Henry Dryer) a journalist and poet (styling himself Henry Dryerre the Third). He attended school in Blairgowrie then Stirling High School.

He originally trained and operated as a pharmacist and only in later life took up study in anatomy, branching from here to animal anatomy. He began lecturing at the University of Edinburgh in 1919. He concurrently began lecturing in animal physiology at the Dick Veterinary College nearby. He received a PhD from the university in 1923. From 1930 he continued at the Vet College but exchanged his university lecturing for a role as a biochemist at the Animal Disease Research Association. In 1935 he ceased the latter role to concentrate on a new role as professor of physiology at the Dick Veterinary College, where he continued until retiral in 1946. He was elected a Fellow of the Royal Society of Edinburgh in 1925. His proposers were Edward Albert Sharpey-Schafer, Anderson Gray McKendrick, Lancelot Hogben and Arthur Robertson Cushny.

Together with Prof John Russell Greig he discovered the cause and nature of milk fever.

He lived at Kenmore, Broomieknowe in Lasswade just south of Edinburgh.

He died in Edinburgh on 5 February 1959.

== Family ==
He married twice: firstly in 1905 to Mary McLaren (died 1940); secondly in 1941 to Agnes Richardson. His only son (by his first wife) was killed in a car crash in 1941 while serving as a physician in the RAF.

On Agnes' death in 1989 she left monies to the Royal Society of Edinburgh to establish the Henry Dryerre Scholarship in his memory. This is administered via the Carnegie Trust. The scholarship is offered every three years to a student obtaining a first class degree in medicine or veterinary studies wishing to undertake a related PhD at a Scottish institution.

== Publications ==
- Further Studies in the Etiology of Milk Fever (1928)
- Aids to Physiology (1931) third edition (1944) fourth edition (1953)
