= Alloa =

Town in Clackmannanshire, Scotland

Coordinates: 56.116°N 3.793°W

Alloa: Scottish Gaelic: Allmhagh, Alamhagh; Scots: Allowae
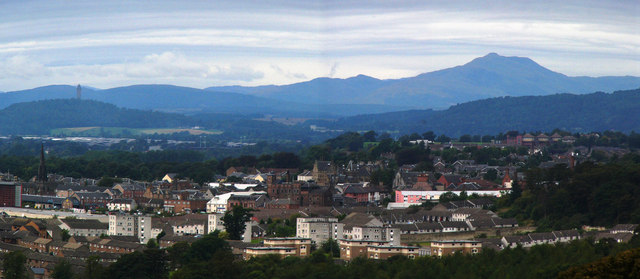
- Alloa from Clackmannan Tower with Ben Ledi and Wallace Monument in the distance

- Location within Clackmannanshire
- Area: 3.52 sq mi (9.1 km^{2})
- Population: 14,440 (2020)
  - Density: 4,102/sq mi (1,584/km^{2})
- OS grid reference: NS900920
- Council area: Clackmannanshire
- Lieutenancy area: Clackmannanshire
- Country: Scotland
- Sovereign state: United Kingdom
- Post town: ALLOA
- Postcode district: FK10
- Dialling code: 01259
- Police: Scotland
- Fire: Scottish
- Ambulance: Scottish
- UK Parliament: Alloa and Grangemouth
- Scottish Parliament: Clackmannanshire and Dunblane

Alloa (/ˈæloʊə/ AL-oh-wə; Scottish Gaelic: Alamhagh, possibly meaning "rock plain") is a town in Clackmannanshire in the Central Lowlands of Scotland. It is on the north bank of the Forth at the spot where some say it ceases to be the River Forth and becomes the Firth of Forth. Alloa is south of the Ochil Hills on the western Fife peninsula, six miles (ten kilometres) east of Stirling and 13 miles (21 km) west of Dunfermline; by water Alloa is 25 miles (40 km) from Granton.

The town, formerly a burgh of barony, is the administrative centre of Clackmannanshire Council. Historically, the economy relied heavily on trade between Glasgow and mainland Europe through its port. This became increasingly uncompetitive and the port stopped operating in 1970. The local economy is now centred on retail and leisure since the closure of major industries; only one brewer and one glassmaker survive today. Parochially, Alloa was linked with Tullibody. The towns are now distinct, albeit with Lornshill in the middle, and Alloa is about twice the size of its north-western neighbour. The population of Alloa was estimated to be approximately 20,730 residents in 2016.

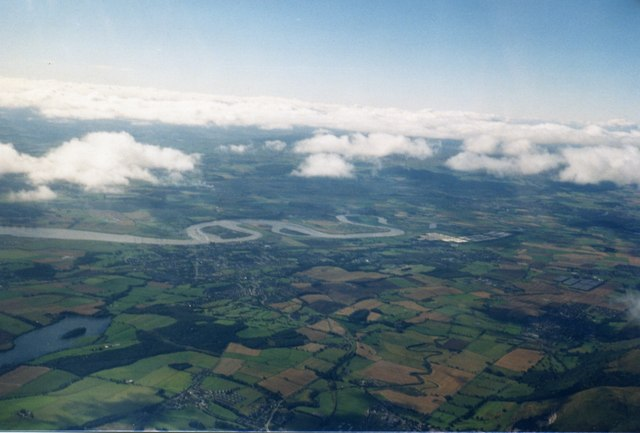
The Forth Valley near Alloa: Gartmorn Dam, Alloa Inch and Tullibody Inch can be seen on the Forth

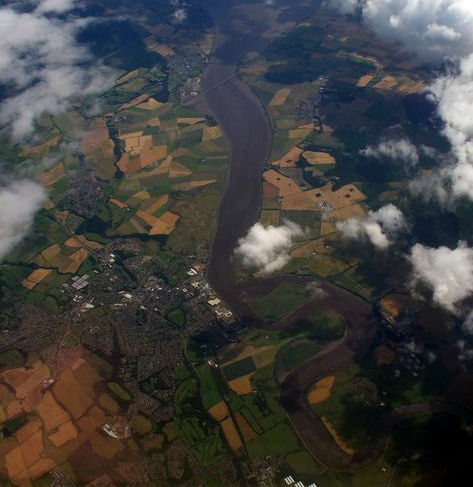
Alloa from the air

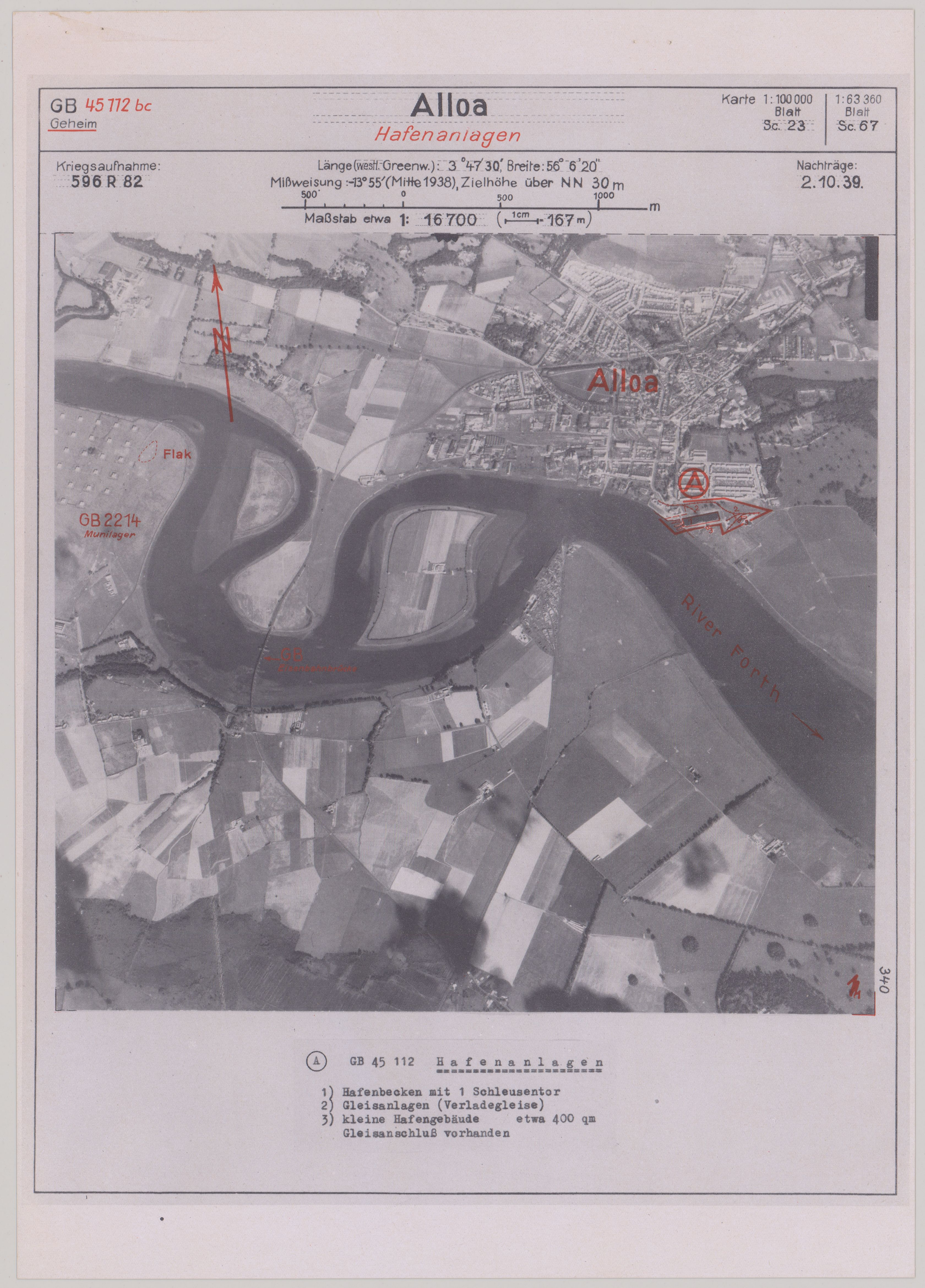
Port of Alloa on a target dossier of the German Luftwaffe, 1939

== History ==
Alloa grew up under the protection of Alloa Tower which may have been built before 1300 AD. The name of the town has had different spelling at different periods. In the charter granted by King Robert the Bruce in the year 1315, to Thomas de Erskyne, it is called Alway; in some subsequent ones, Aulway, Auleway; and more recently Alloway. Dr Jamieson stated that the most probable etymology of the name was from Aull Waeg – the way to the sea.

=== 14th century ===
Sir Robert Erskine was granted the lands of Alloa and its environs in 1368 for services to King David II and he and his descendants were good stewards, developing the estates and innovating.

=== 17th century ===
One of the earliest maps of the area was made by surveyor and cartographer John Adair in 1681. Alloa also has a history of persecution of witches.

=== 18th century ===
John Erskine, the 6th Earl of Mar oversaw many far-reaching developments including substantial harbour improvements, a customs house, a "New Town" area of housing, and commissioning the building of the Gartmorn Dam, which was designed by George Sorocold. Erskine owned many of the coal mines, and Robert Bald, a local mining engineer, was contracted to provide water power from the Gartmorn Dam to operate the mines and other industries. Good water supplies and the availability of barley from the carselands encouraged George Younger to set up a brewery in the 1760s and he was soon followed by others. Alloa became one of Scotland's premier brewing centres.

The 6th Earl of Mar was forced to flee the country and forfeit his lands after disastrously backing the Jacobite cause in 1715. However, his brother was allowed to purchase the forfeited lands and future generations continued the tradition of creative industry by launching a glass-works in 1750 and laying Alloa Waggonway, one of Scotland's earliest railways, from the Sauchie mines down to the harbour around 1766.

Before 1775, the colliers were attached to the properties in which they were born and were virtual serfs or slaves, supported by the master. After the Colliers and Salters (Scotland) Act 1775 abolished the system, the colliers could move between collieries at will, and they were supported in their needs by the Alloa Colliers' Fund or Friendly Society which was founded in 1775.

Traces of the waggonway and the Gartmorn Dam can still be seen today, and although the dam is no longer used for energy production or water supply, it is well used for fishing and leisure purposes. The Clackmannanshire Library was founded at Alloa in 1797 and it contained upwards of 1500 volumes. As the 18th century closed a whisky distillery was established at Carsebridge by John Bald.

In the 18th century the staple business of the port was coal with about 50,000 tons a year exported.

=== 19th century ===
In 1813 the first steamboat started to operate out of Alloa harbour. Rival companies later united into the "Stirling, Alloa and Kincardine Steamboat Company". In 1822 water was brought into the town and in 1828 a gas works was built. While building a road to Alloa Academy in 1828, an ancient burial site was found at Mars Hill, with several finds including two gold armlets. Alloa Academy was built in 1824, being paid for by subscription. The Alloa Swing Bridge was opened to the public on 1 October 1885.

The population was 5,434 in the 1841 census.

=== 20th century ===
After the improvements were made to the harbour during the 18th century, Alloa thrived as a river port through which the products of Glasgow manufacture were exported to continental Europe. At that time, and until the 1950s, the main industry to the north and east of the town was coal mining.

== Industries ==
=== Wool ===
Wool was also locally plentiful and in the early part of the 19th century, John Paton set up a small yarn-spinning business in the town, later establishing Kilncraigs Mill. Much of the Kilncraigs complex has been demolished but a four-storey Edwardian Baroque block of 1903–1904 survives, with an extension of 1936. The buildings were converted to Council offices by LDN architects in 2003/2004. Patons merged with J. & J. Baldwin of Halifax in 1924 to become Paton & Baldwins Ltd.

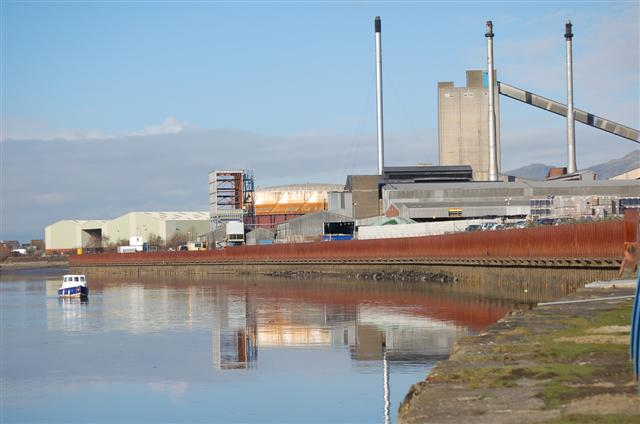
Owens-Illinois glassworks in Alloa

=== Weaving and glass making ===
The town itself continued to be known for its weaving and glassmaking industries well into the 19th and early 20th centuries.

=== Brewing ===
Alloa was long associated with the brewing industry, with at least nine major breweries producing ales at its height. However industrial decline during the mid to late 20th century has led to the economy relying more on retail and leisure. The first brewing firms in the town were Younger in 1762 and Meiklejohn in 1784. Alloa ale was sent to London and George Younger had an extensive export trade to the West Indies, Egypt and the Far East. Alloa was also home to Alloa Brewery Co, developing Graham's Golden Lager in 1927 which was renamed Skol in the 1950s. Closures and mergers during the mid-20th century reduced the number of breweries to two and by 1999 after the closure of MacLay's Thistle Brewery, only one remained, the Forth Brewery which became Williams Bros. in 2003.

=== Malt distilling ===
In addition to the brewing of beer, Alloa is the site of the former Carsebridge Distillery. According to Alfred Barnard, the Victorian historian of British distilling and brewing, the distillery was founded as a malt distillery by John Bald in 1799. In the 1840s it was converted into a grain distillery and by the time of Barnard's visit in the mid-1880s the distillery covered 10 acres, employed 150 people, and had an annual output of 1.4 to 1.7 million gallons of pure grain whisky. The distillery's owner John Bald and Co was one of five companies that combined to form the Distillers Company Limited in 1877. In 1902, a fire devastated the distillery, after World War I it was refitted and started producing yeast. This yeast production lasted until 1938. In 1956 the distillery was modernised, it expanded in 1966 and in the 1970s a new still house, cooperage and animal feedstuffs plant added. By 1980 the Carsebridge Distillery was the largest grain distillery in Scotland, however it closed in 1983 and was demolished in 1992. One of the distillery's Coffey stills is now in use at the Cameronbridge distillery.

=== Barrel cooperage ===
After whisky ceased to be produced at Carsebridge, the cooperage remained as one of two owned by Diageo in Scotland. In 2008, 30 people worked there assembling or repairing up to 400 bourbon casks, imported from the US, each day. However, in 2009 the company announced that it intended to close the Carsebridge Cooperage and move the work to nearby Cambus. The new Cambus cooperage was opened in December 2011 by the Earl of Wessex.

=== Military history ===
Alloa is linked to the historic Argyll and Sutherland Highlanders housed at Stirling Castle. Many of the soldiers in the Second World War fought under Montgomery at the Battle of El Alamein and Wadi Akrit where their commanding officer Lorne Campbell won a V.C. They were part of the 7th Argylls under the 51st Highland Division.

=== Police ===
As of 2014, the temporary national headquarters of Police Scotland is located in Alloa.

== Landmarks ==
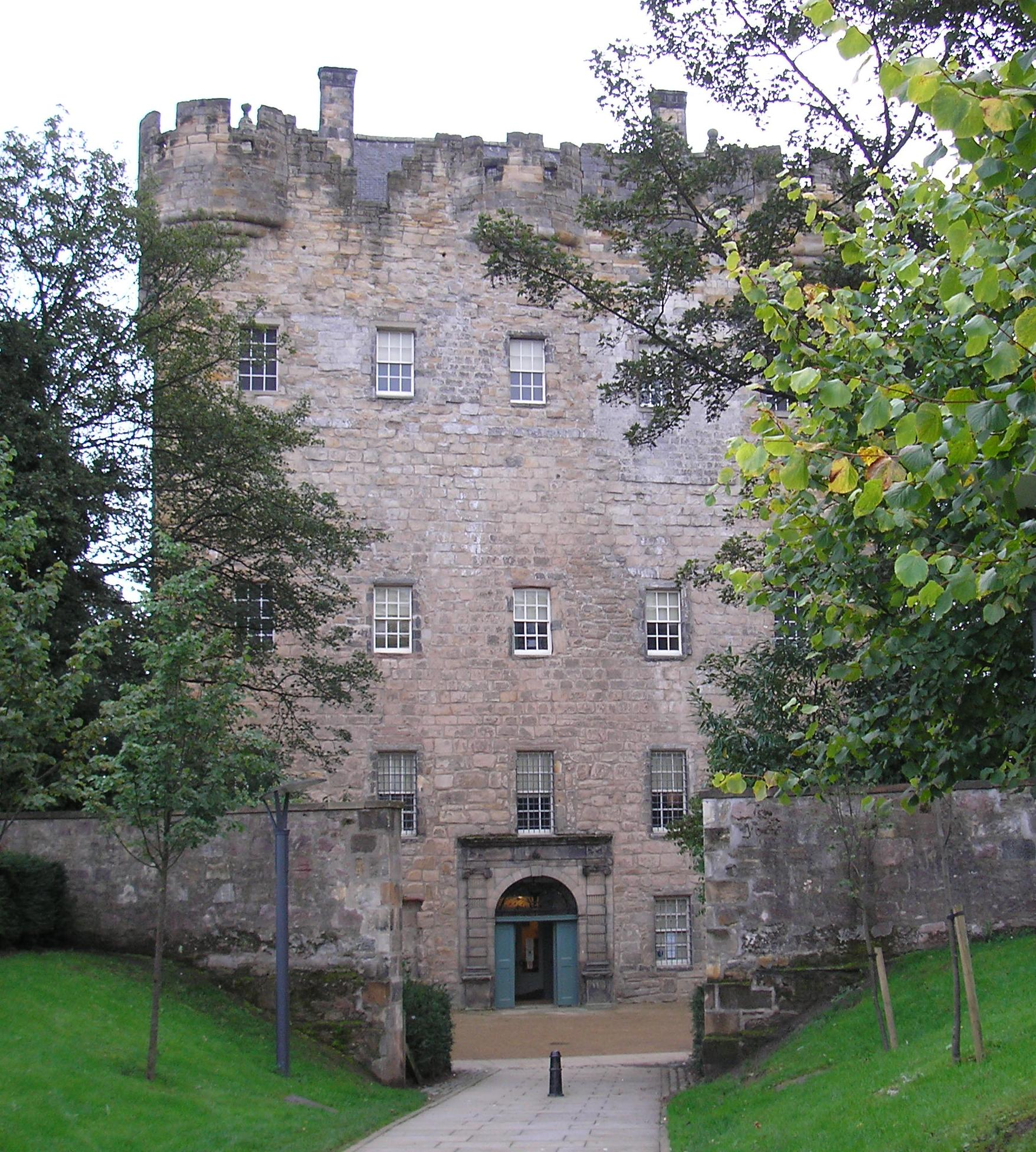
Alloa Tower

Alloa's most famous landmark is the 15th century Alloa Tower (National Trust for Scotland), the surviving part of the ancestral medieval residence of the Erskine family, the Earls of Mar. Despite extensive internal and external alterations, the Tower retains its original medieval wooden roof and battlements, as well as some internal features. It is one of the largest and earliest of Scottish tower houses.

The town formerly contained a large number of 17th and 18th century buildings, but many were cleared with the expansion of milling operations and later with slum clearance in the 20th century. However, Alloa does retain some historic architecture in the form of Alloa Tower, Tobias Bauchop's House at 25 Kirkgate (1695), as well as later buildings such as Inglewood House (c. 1900), Gean House (1912) and Greenfield House (1892).

Carsebridge House, known locally as the Doll's House, was a B-listed two-storey house built around 1799 as part of the plan to establish the Carsebridge Distillery. It survived the demolition of the distillery buildings in the 1990s, but was badly damaged by fire in August 2024. It was illegally demolished in September 2024 without listed-building consent.

Alloa Town Hall and Library was designed by the architect Alfred Waterhouse and built in 1886–89 at a cost of £18,008.

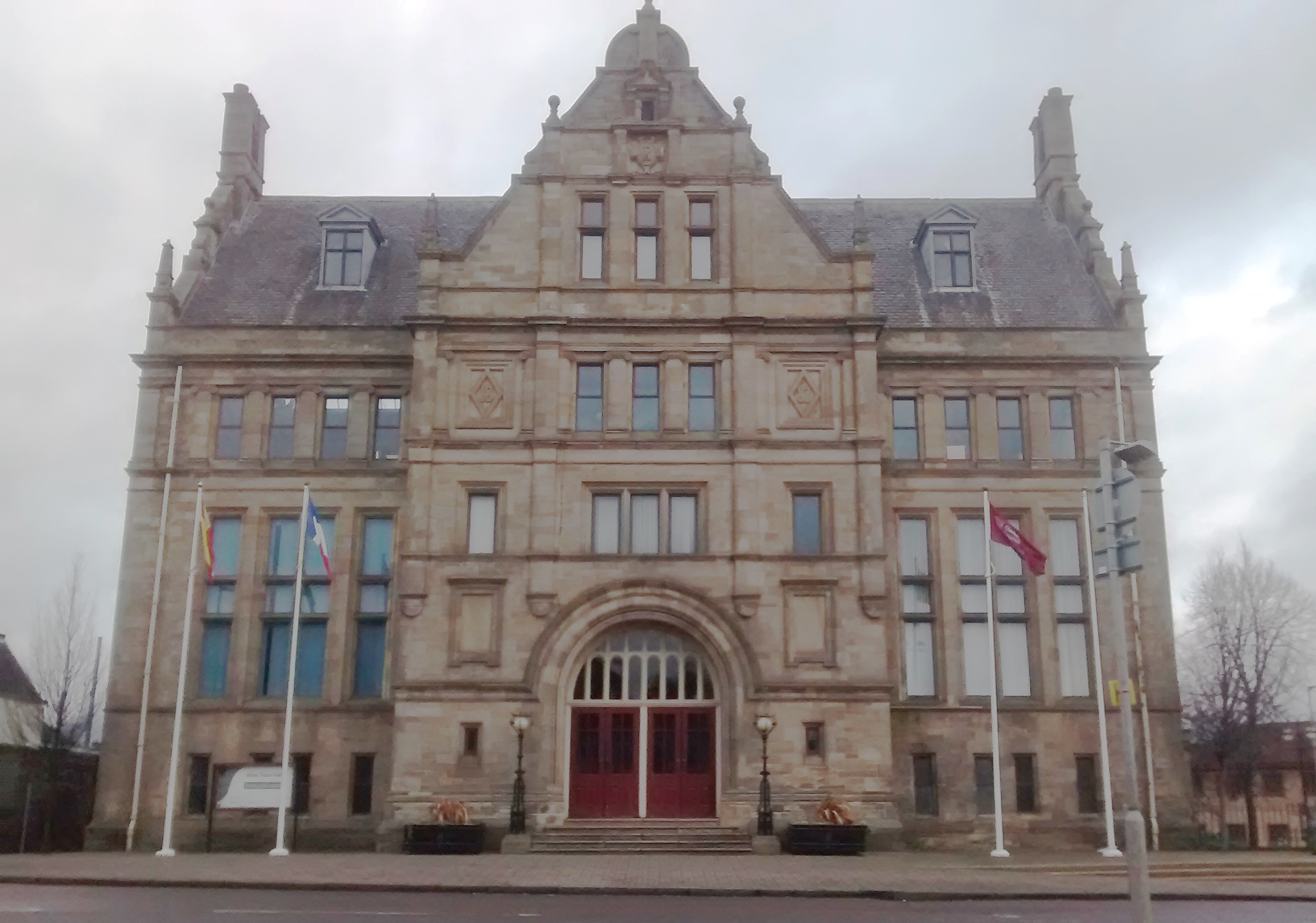
Alloa Town Hall

The Speirs Centre was built as Alloa's swimming pool in 1895 and was designed by Sir John Burnet of Glasgow. The Sheriff Court is by Brown and Wardrop of 1862–5.

Alloa War Memorial (designed 1920 erected 1925) is by Sir Robert Lorimer with sculpture by Pilkington Jackson. The monument to the South African War is also by Lorimer (1904).

== Transport ==
After the closure of the Stirling-Alloa-Dunfermline line in 1968 and the Devon Valley Railway in 1973, the town had no passenger railway services for 40 years until 2008. The Stirling-Alloa-Kincardine rail link project was completed in May 2008. The laying of new track had commenced in September 2006 after much preparatory work, including new drainage works and the grouting of a large number of shallow mine workings. The project also involved the construction of a new bypass road, and a bridge which replaced a level crossing in the town. Alloa railway station reopened in May 2008, a short distance east of its former site, just beyond the location of the former junction to the Devon Valley line that served Tillicoultry and Dollar, and also carried through trains to Kinross and Perth.

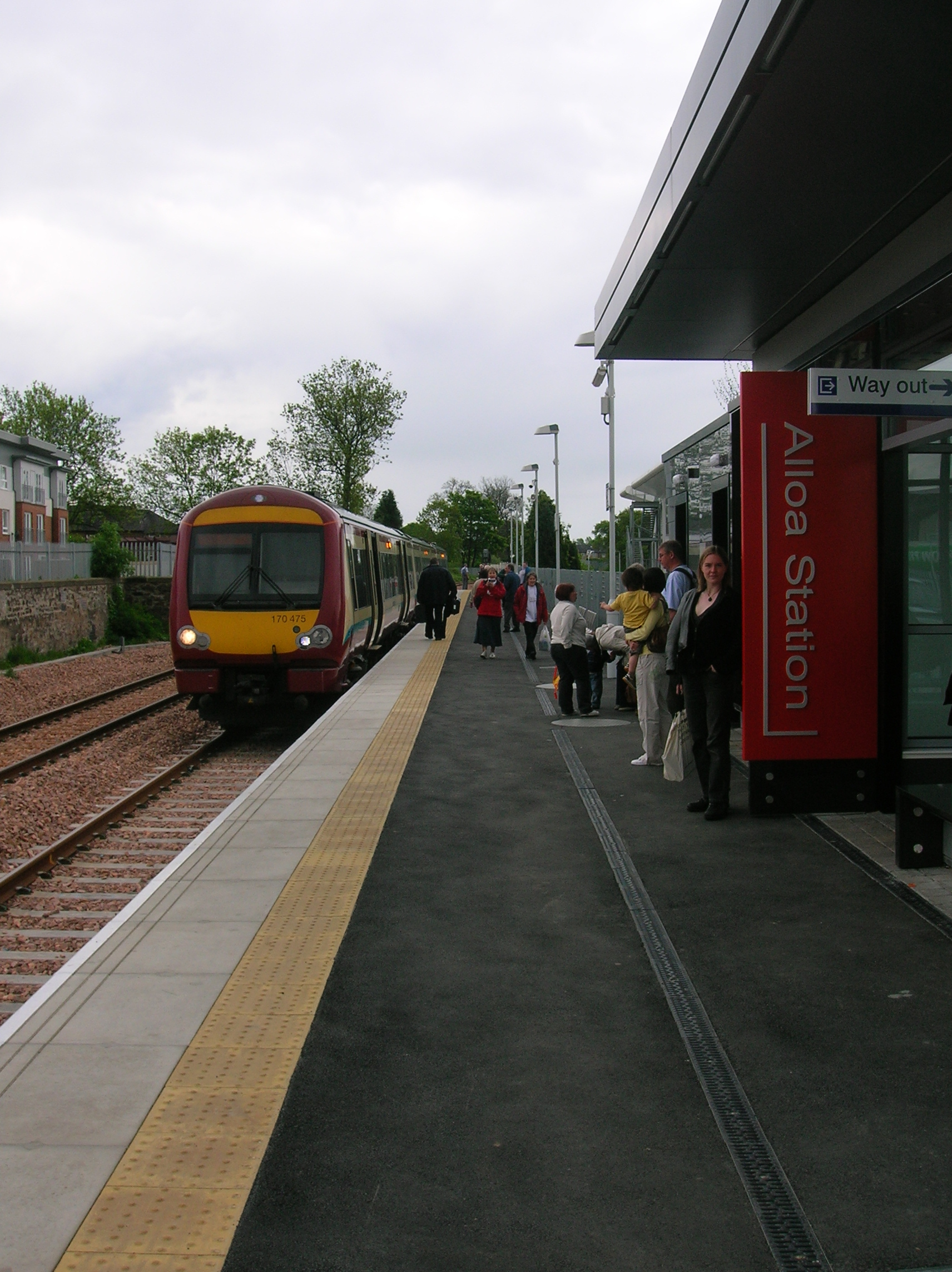
Alloa station on the day of reopening in May 2008, 40 years after it closed

ScotRail now operates a half-hourly service from Alloa railway station to Glasgow Queen Street via Stirling, Larbert and Croy between 0641 and 2315 Monday to Saturday and between 1041 and 2141 on Sundays. Passengers can travel to Inverness, Edinburgh Waverley and Aberdeen with a change at Stirling, however for journeys to or from Edinburgh passengers with heavy luggage may find it more convenient to change at Larbert, where Edinburgh and Glasgow services use the same platform.

The new railway opened for traincrew route learning in early April 2008, followed by the opening to the public on Monday 19 May 2008. This had been preceded by an official opening on 15 May 2008, where LNER Gresley K4 61994 The Great Marquess hauled four specials to Stirling. The return workings were hauled by Deltic 55022 Royal Scots Grey. Transport Minister Stewart Stevenson officially reopened the line.

== Education ==
Besides the two high schools of Lornshill Academy and Alloa Academy, the town also has four primary schools: Sunnyside, Redwell, Park, and St Mungos. In addition to these, the New Struan School is an independently run day and residential school catering for children of both primary and high school ages with autistic spectrum disorders. There is also a OneSchool Global UK that is affiliated to the Plymouth Brethren Christian Church.

== Religious sites ==
Alloa is currently served by two churches in the Church of Scotland, namely Alloa Ludgate Church (formed by the union of Alloa North Parish Church and Alloa West Parish Church in 2009 in the building of the former West Church) and St. Mungo's Parish Church. In 1978 the Very Rev Dr Peter Brodie (then minister at St Mungo's) was elected Moderator of the General Assembly of the Church of Scotland. Four other former St. Mungo's ministers have held this position. Its current minister, the Rev. Sang Y Cha, is the first Korean to be ordained to The Church of Scotland. Alloa is part of the Church of Scotland's Presbytery of Stirling.

St John The Evangelist Scottish Episcopal Church. St John's is one on the olderst Scottish Episcopal congregations in Scotland. In 1724 the Rev John Alexander was appointed priest to Alloa and he opened the 1st John's. The current building in Broad St is their third. It was opened in 1869 and extended in 1874.

The Church has various works of art, which include; The High Altar mosaic of the Last Supper by Antonio Salviati. The organ case and war memorial are by Robert Lorimer as is the rood screen.

There is a collection of stain glass windows. The bell tower contains eight bells.

The United Free Church of Scotland has a presence in Alloa through the congregation at Moncrieff United Free Church in Drysdale Street. The congregation is served by the Rev. Jason Lingiah and is part of the Presbytery of East.

On Greenside Street, in the old Greenside mission hall (a mission of Moncrieff United Free Church), is Alloa Elim Pentecostal Church.

There are churches of other denominations in the town, including a Baptist church, . There are also congregations of Latter-day Saints and Jehovah's Witnesses in Alloa.

The Catholic church, also named St Mungo's, is located in Mar Street. The church is part of the Roman Catholic Diocese of Dunkeld.

There is a Musalla on Whins Road in Alloa. Muslims who are unable to attend a mosque can use this space as a place of prayer, worship and education. In 2003 it became open to the public.

== Sport ==
Alloa is home to one professional football club: Alloa Athletic Football Club. The club was formed in 1880 under the name of Alloa but changed to its present-day name of Alloa Athletic in 1881. The team currently play in the Scottish Championship, formerly the Scottish Football League First Division, after being promoted as winners of a play-off with Dunfermline Athletic, the season after being crowned champions of the Scottish Football League Third Division at the end of the 2011–12 season. Their home games are played at Recreation Park in Alloa.

== Media ==
Alloa's oldest newspaper, the Alloa Advertiser, was founded in 1841 as a monthly but in 1855 it became a weekly. Similarly, in 1845, the monthly Clackmannanshire Advertiser became the Alloa Journal. More recently the Wee County News was launched in 1995 but went into liquidation in 2011. Some footage of a woollen mill and glassworks exists on film. River Forth (1956) B&W silent 15 mins.

== Famous people ==
- David Allan (1744–1796), 18th century painter and illustrator
- Robert Bald (1776–1861), mining engineer
- Jeffrey Batters Home-Hay (1887–1953), Canadian flying ace and bush pilot
- Thomas Bowie (1877–1974), cricketer
- George Brown (1818–1880), Canadian politician and founder of The Globe and Mail newspaper
- John Crawford Buchan (1892–1918), recipient of the Victoria Cross
- John Ferguson (1837–1916), chemist
- Robert Fyfe (1930–2021), actor
- James Sligo Jameson (1856–1888), explorer
- Archibald MacLaren (1820–1884), gymnast and educator
- Andrew Norman Meldrum (1876–1934), scientist
- John Melvin (1855–1905), architect
- Lord Charles Forte (1908–2007), hotelier and caterer who lived in Alloa
- Duncan Scott (swimmer) (born 1997), grew up in Alloa
- Douglas Robert Brown (born 1969), cricketer, schooled and spent his youth in Alloa
- John Jameson (1740–1823), distiller, founder of Jameson Irish Whiskey and great-grandfather of Guglielmo Marconi
- James Smith (1808–1863), architect in west Scotland
- David Wilson, Baron Wilson of Tillyorn (born 1935), British Colonial administrator, 26th Governor of Hong Kong and retired politician

== See also ==
- List of places in Clackmannanshire
- Alloa witches
- Margaret Duchill

== References and sources ==
Sources

- "Alloa and its Environs: A descriptive and Historical Sketch", Alloa Advertiser, 1861

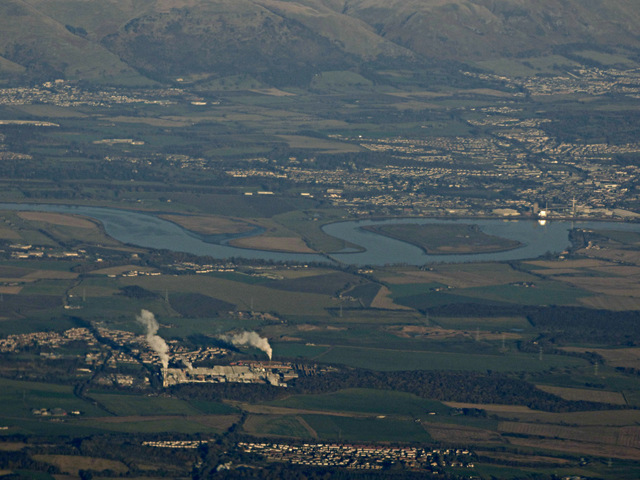
Alloa from the air above Stirlingshire
