= Granule cell dispersion =

Granule cell dispersion is one of the abnormal structural changes that has been shown in brains of patients with temporal lobe epilepsy. It has also been shown in different animal models, such as the kainic acid model, pilocarpine model, and kindling model. But granule cell dispersion was not found by using perforant pathway stimulation.

It was first described by Houser. In a normal situation, the granule cells in dentate gyrus should be tightly packed. But in granule cell dispersion, the compact formation was lost, and the axons need to extend longer to reach the neighboring granule cells.

== Mechanism of formation ==
There are currently two hypotheses for the mechanism. It might be a consequence of a migration disorder, and the first hypothesis considers an initial injury that release toxin(s) that affect the normal migration of granule cells. The second hypothesis concerns the role of reelin (see below).

=== Reelin role in temporal lobe epilepsy ===
Reelin is required for normal neuronal lamination humans, and the lack of this expression can lead to migration defect associated with temporal lobe epilepsy
