= Lornshill Academy =

School in Clackmannanshire, Scotland

Coordinates: 56.132°N 3.816°W

Location
- Tullibody Road; Alloa, Clackmannanshire, FK69 3BW; Scotland

Information
- Type: Coeducational Secondary
- Motto: United in Effort
- Religious affiliation: Non-denominational
- Established: 1970; 56 years ago
- Head Teacher: Tom Black
- Gender: Mixed
- Age: 11 to 18
- Enrolment: 1049
- Houses: Devon Forebraes Grange Ochil
- Colours: Black and white
- School Years: S1 to S6
- Website: www.lornshill.clacks.sch.uk

Lornshill Academy is a six-year comprehensive school situated in Alloa, Clackmannanshire, Scotland. Approximately 1049 pupils are enrolled with the school. Lornshill currently employs approximately 80 teachers and around 30 support staff. Lornshill is currently associated with seven primaries – Craigbank, Clackmannan, Banchory, Fishcross, Deerpark, Abercromby and Saint Serfs.

== Pupils ==
Pupils are placed in one of four houses: Devon, Forebraes, Grange and Ochil. Pupils are normally of the ages 11 – 18 and are split into a standard S1-S6. These years are then again split into two subgroups: Junior (S1-S3), and Senior (S4-S6).

== Famous pupils ==
- Jonathan Gavin, World Masters Champion 1978 to June, 1984.

== Notable former staff ==
Ex-First Minister of Scotland, Jack McConnell, taught Maths at Lornshill.

Ex-professional footballer, Alan Cousin, was an English teacher and Deputy Rector until he retired in 1995.
