= Alloa witches =

1658 witch trial in early modern Scotland

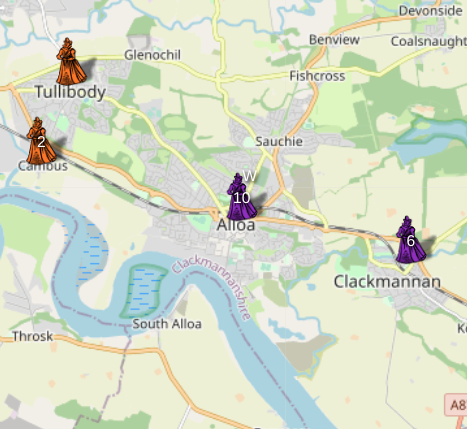
Survey of Scottish Witchcraft trials (1563 to 1736) around Alloa

The persecution of the Alloa witches began in Stirling during the early modern period. In 1658, the presbyter Matthias Symson (1625–1664) met with George Bennett, minister of Saint Ninian's, to confer with the persons there apprehended for witchcraft and to try to bring them to confession. On 23 June 1658, the Presbytery held a subsequent meeting to the suspected persons. The first person to go to trial was Margaret Duchill. There were a total of 13 people accused of witchcraft from the urban parish, which may include Alloa's adjacent rural area.

One important aspect of the Scottish witchcraft trials was the reports of demonic sex. Women were asked about sex with the devil regularly, this was more of an interest of the authorities in deviant sex rather than in the witches' real lives.

== The Accused ==
The persecution of alleged witches from Alloa spans 59 years. During this period, 13 people were accused of witchcraft, 12 women and 1 man.

=== 1634 ===
- Janet Taylor

=== 1658 ===
- Katherine Remy
- Elizabeth 'Bessie' Paton
- Janet Black
- Margaret Tailyeor
- Margaret Demperston
- Margaret Duchill
- Katherine Kay

=== 1659 ===
- Barbara Erskine
- James Kirk

=== 1662 ===
- Elizabeth Black
- Katherine Black
- Elizabeth Crockatt
