= John Russell Greig =

Scottish veterinarian

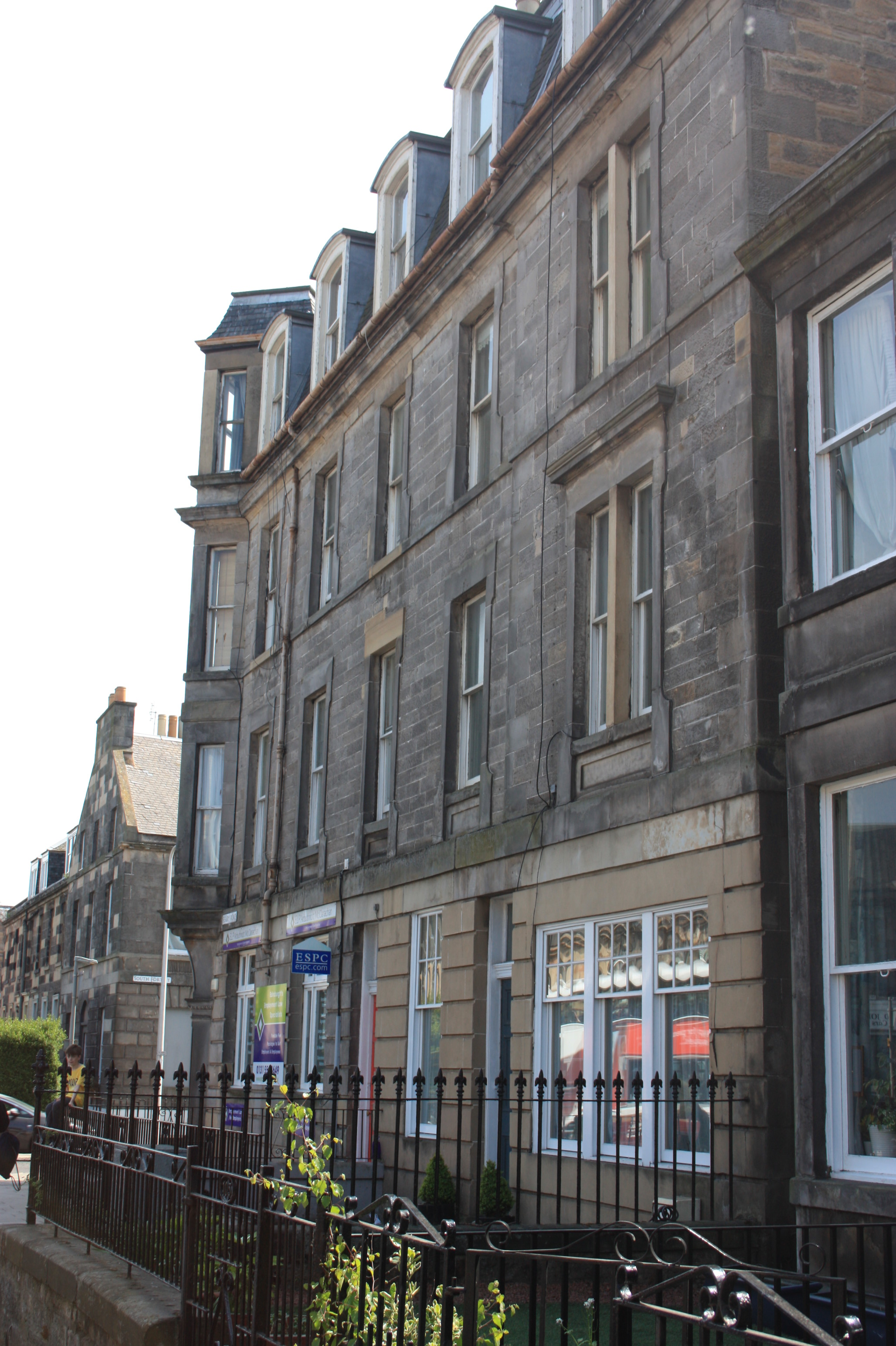
101 Ferry Road, Edinburgh

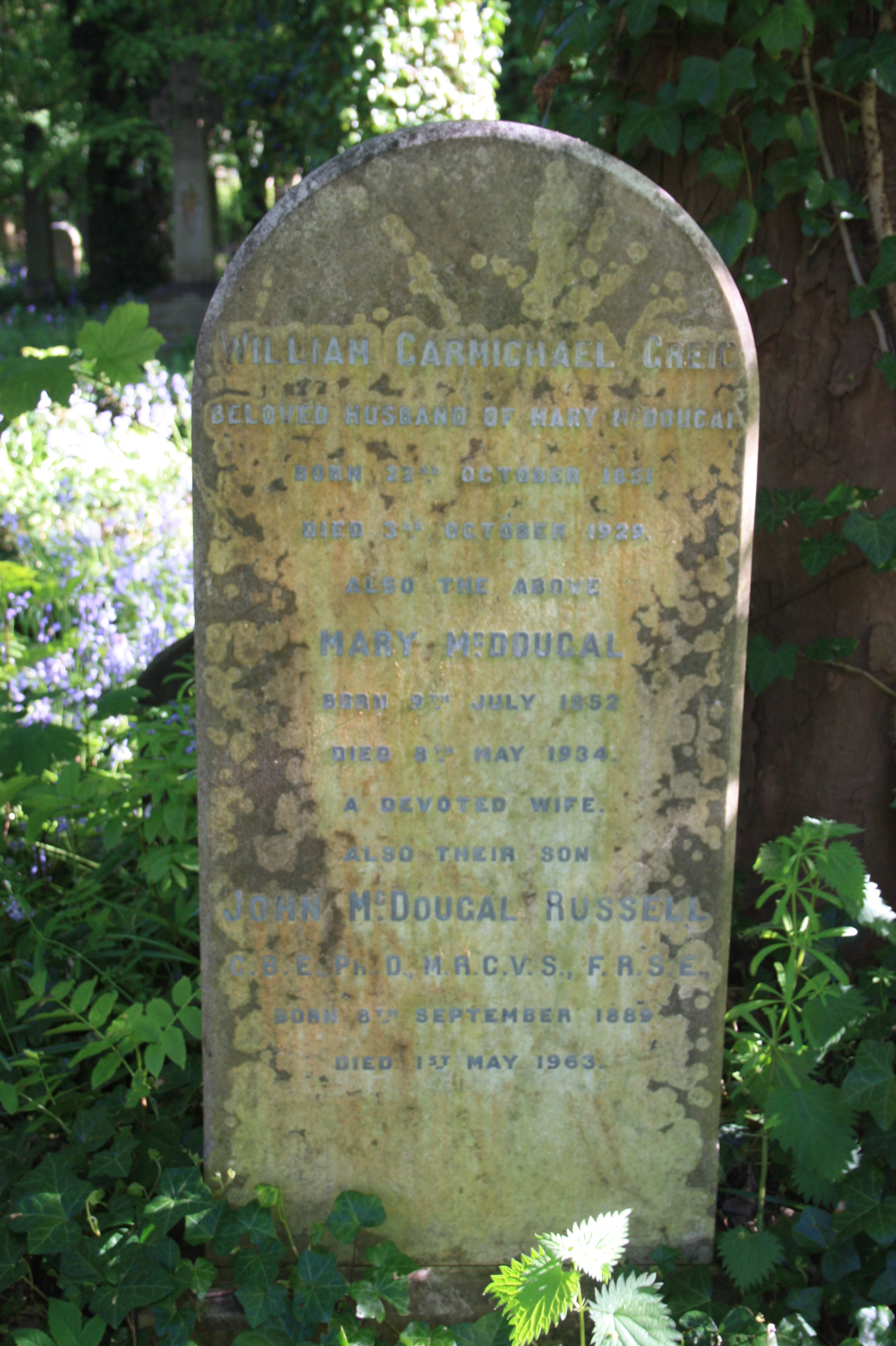
The grave of John Russell Greig, Warriston Cemetery

John McDougal Russell Greig CBE FRSE MRCVS (September 1889 – 1 May 1963) was a Scottish veterinarian who was Director of the Moredun Research Institute from 1930 to 1954. He is noted for the development of several important animal vaccines: Enzootic abortion in ewes; Braxy and Louping ill. His work on milk effectively created "clean milk" for the first time in Britain.

== Life ==
He was born in Leith on 8 September 1889 the son of William Carmichael Greig (1851-1929), a grocer, and his wife Mary McDougal (1852–1934). They lived in a second floor flat at 101 Ferry Road, which was then just newly built.

He was educated at the Royal High School in Edinburgh. In 1906 he entered the Royal (Dick) School of Veterinary Studies. He completed his studies in 1911 and was admitted a member of the Royal College of Veterinary Surgeons. He then began working in the Veterinary Department of the City of Glasgow. He self-financed a trip to Copenhagen to meet Bernhard Bang and learn of his studies on bovine tuberculosis.

In the First World War he served as a Captain in the Royal Army Veterinary Corps. On demob he joined the Department of Agriculture and was posted to South Wales to tackle a rabies outbreak, gaining him the nickname "Rabies Russell".

In September 1919 he was appointed Professor of Materia Medica at his alma mater, the Royal Dick College in Edinburgh. He was granted a doctorate (PhD) from the University of Edinburgh in 1929, for his thesis Acute calcium deficiency in relation to disease in farm animals, with special reference to milk fever in cows.

In 1931 he was elected a Fellow of the Royal Society of Edinburgh. His proposers were Francis Albert Eley Crew, James Hartley Ashworth, Sir William Wright Smith, and Henry Dryerre . He was awarded the Society's Neill Prize for 1949–51.

In 1946 he was created a Commander of the Order of the British Empire (CBE).

He retired in 1954 and was succeeded by John Trevor Stamp.

== Death ==
He died in Edinburgh on 1 May 1963. He was buried with his parents in Warriston Cemetery. The relatively small marble stone lies on the south side of the path linking the main western path to the central roundel.

== Publications ==
- Dryerre, Henry; Greig, J. Russell (1925). "Milk Fever: Its Possible Association with Derangements in the Internal Secretions". The Canadian Veterinary Journal. 6 (3): 199–201. PMC 1680035. PMID 17422545.
- Greig, J. Russell. "Mineral Deficiency Diseases In Farm Animals * *Summary of Lecture delivered at the Royal Veterinary College, London, May 18th, 1936, under the auspices of the University of London". The Veterinary Journal.
- The Nature of Lambing Sickness (1929)
- Greig, J. Russell (1933). "Pine: A disease affecting sheep and young cattle". The Scottish Journal of Agriculture. 16. H.M. Stationery Office: 298.
- Greig, J.R. (October 1950). "Scrapie in sheep". Journal of Comparative Pathology. 60 (4): 263–6. doi:10.1016/s0368-1742(50)80024-3. PMID 14814231.
- The Shepherd's Guide (1951)
- Grieg and his Scottish Ancestry (1953)
- Greig, J. Russell (January 1953). "The Sheep-Dog — Its Management and Feeding". British Veterinary Journal. 109 (1): 14–32. doi:10.1016/S0007-1935(17)51192-6.
