= Carnegie Trust for the Universities of Scotland =

Charitable trust established by Andrew Carnegie

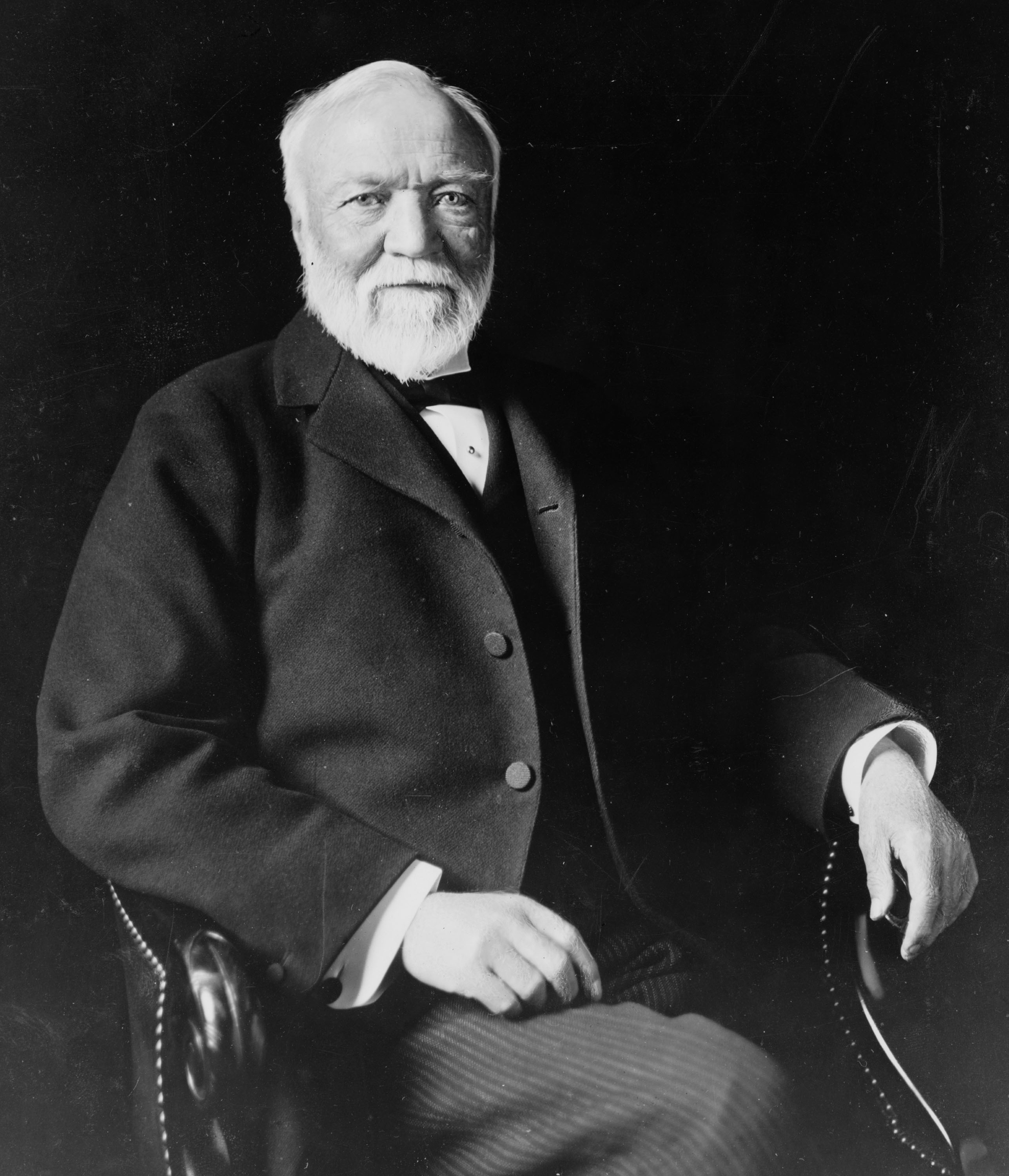
Andrew Carnegie

The Carnegie Trust for the Universities of Scotland is a charitable trust established by Andrew Carnegie in 1901 for the benefit of the universities of Scotland, their students and their staff.

The incorporation of the Trust was by royal charter in August 1902, later replaced in July 1978. The endowment of the Trust on establishment was $10 million (an unprecedented gift, amounting to around 200-times the annual governmental funding of the four Scottish universities at the time). In 2004-5, the assets of the Trust amounted to £58million, which enabled awards of £1,667,540 to be made. Under the terms set down by Andrew Carnegie, one half of the Trust's income is reserved for "the improvement and expansion of the Universities of Scotland" with the other half to go towards "the payment of fees of students of Scottish birth or extraction in respect of courses leading to a degree of a Scottish University".

The ex–officio Trustees of the Trust are: the Principals of the Universities of Scotland; the First Minister of Scotland and the Lords Provost of Edinburgh and Glasgow. (Prior to Scottish devolution, the Secretary of State for Scotland held the ex officio post currently occupied by the First Minister.) There are fourteen nominated Trustees, made up of esteemed Scots from various fields. The Executive Committee, which manages the Trust itself, consists of five of the nominated Trustees and four of the Principals of the Scottish Universities in rotation.

The Trust is well known for its efficient administration: although the Trust gives £2 million a year to several hundred beneficiaries, it does so with only two full-time and three part-time employees. The Trust also enjoys many voluntary repayments by beneficiaries (mainly through legacies) which go towards the Trust's general fund – in 2004-5, these repayments amounted to £134,850.

It is a registered charity under Scottish law.

== Schemes ==
=== Carnegie Scholarships ===
The Trust funds a small, prestigious group of scholarships for Scottish graduates with at least first-class honours degrees who are working towards a doctoral degree. The Trust intends such scholarships to be the "premier award in Scotland" and they are generally more generous awards than the equivalent from a Research Council. The scheme is highly competitive: although the number of scholarships awarded each year is not fixed, it is usually around 12–15, and the number of applicants is usually many times this. (For example, in 2008, only 15 out of 142 applicants were successful). All applicants must be nominated by an academic at a Scottish university and pursue their degrees in Scotland. Each Scottish university has a set quota of Scholarships.

=== Henry Dryerre Scholarship ===
On behalf of the Royal Society of Edinburgh, the Henry Dryerre Scholarship is for postgraduate study by a graduate of a Scottish university in medical or veterinary physiology. It is only offered every three years. It is named after the physiologist Henry Dryerre (1881–1959).

=== Fee Assistance ===
Undergraduates undertaking first degrees at a Scottish university whose tuition fees are not met by the governmental Student Awards Agency for Scotland can apply to the Trust for fee assistance. These awards are means-tested, and it is a requirement for assistance that paying fees would cause the applicant hardship such that it would not be possible for them to continue with their degree. In 2004-5 there were 211 applicants and 163 awards made.

=== Vacation Scholarships ===
Undergraduates of Scottish extraction can apply for a competitive Vacation Scholarship to undertake a short, full-time research project during their summer vacation. Candidates must be nominated by a university Dean of Faculty, and are for maintenance awards of between two and twelve weeks. The scholarship can be held in the United Kingdom or abroad. For the five year period from 2013 to 2018, there was an average of 147 applications and 85 scholarships awarded per year, giving an average 58% success rate. The most successful university in number of awards over the same period was Strathclyde followed by Glasgow.

=== University Expeditions ===
The Trust used to fund grants towards the cost of expeditions for undergraduates supported by a Scottish university. Such expeditions are to have "a coherent research programme and must be accompanied throughout by a member of staff or someone of equal standing acceptable to the Trust".

=== Research Incentive Grants ===
Research staff of the Scottish universities are eligible for the scheme, which awards grants of up to £7,500 for personal research.

=== Collaborative Research Grants ===
The Scheme awards funding for "joint programmes of collaborative research projects from groups within the Scottish Universities".

=== Carnegie Centenary Professorships ===
In 2001, the Trust established a Centenary Fund to celebrate the centenary of Andrew Carnegie's original 1901 endowment. The yearly income for this fund (£80,000 in 2004-5) goes towards the appointment of two world-class Carnegie Centenary Professors per year for a sabbatical period in Scotland.

== See also ==
- Carnegie United Kingdom Trust
