= Thomas Bowie (cricketer) =

Scottish cricketer

Personal information
- Full name: Thomas Alexander Bowie
- Born: 21 February 1877; Alloa, Clackmannanshire, Scotland
- Died: 23 January 1974 (aged 96); Stirling, Stirlingshire, Scotland
- Batting: Right-handed
- Bowling: Right-arm medium

Domestic team information
- Years: Team
- 1906–1913: Scotland

Career statistics
Competition	First-class
Matches	8
Runs scored	252
Batting average	18.00
100s/50s	–/2
Top score	66
Balls bowled	216
Wickets	4
Bowling average	38.75
5 wickets in innings	–
10 wickets in match	–
Best bowling	3/34
Catches/stumpings	4/–
- Source: Cricinfo, 29 July 2022

Thomas Alexander Bowie (21 February 1877 — 23 January 1974) was a Scottish first-class cricketer and brewer.

The son of Thomas Bowie senior, an inspector of the poor, he was born at Alloa in February 1877. A club cricketer for Clackmannan County, Bowie made his debut for Scotland in first-class cricket against the touring West Indians at Edinburgh in 1906. He played first-class cricket for Scotland until 1913, making eight appearances. He scored 252 runs in his eight matches at an average of exactly 18; he made two half centuries, with a highest score of 66 against Nottinghamshire in 1908. With his part-time medium pace bowling, he took 4 wickets with best figures of 3 for 34. Bowie served in the First World War, being commissioned as a lieutenant in the Clackmannanshire Volunteer Regiment in December 1916. Outside of cricket, Bowie was a master brewer. He died at Stirling in January 1974.
