= Dietary management =

Dietary management, also known as “foodservice management”, is the practice of providing nutritional options for individuals and groups with diet concerns through supervision of foodservices. Practitioners in dietary management, known as dietary managers, work in hospitals, long-term care facilities, restaurants, school and college cafeterias, correctional facilities, and other foodservice settings, usually implementing meal plans established by a dietitian or nutritionist. They are responsible for supervising the work of other nutrition personnel such as cooks and dietary aides.

== Training and regulation of dietary managers ==
The professional requirements of dietary managers vary across countries and employment settings, but usually include some formal (postsecondary) education and/or on-the-job experience in nutrition care and therapy, management of foodservice operations, human resource management, and sanitation and food safety. Dietary management is not usually subject to professional regulation, although voluntary certification is preferred by many employers.

In Canada, dietary managers with recognized training in areas such as diet therapy, menu planning, food safety and food production may become members of the Canadian Society of Nutrition Management.

In Australia, food service managers with recognized training in areas such as diet therapy, menu planning, food safety and food production may become members of the Institute of Hospitality in HealthCare (IHHC) or the Food Service Association of Australia (FSA).

In the United States, dietary managers with a composite of education and experience may take a certification exam offered by the Dietary Managers Association (DMA), known as the Dietary Manager Credentialing Exam. Eligibility requirements to take the exam include a DMA-approved diploma in nutrition, foodservice management, culinary arts, hotel-restaurant management, institutional foodservice management, or military dietary manager training. Training may have been taken at a designated school or through distance learning. Passing the exam allows use of the title “Certified Dietary Manager” or “Certified Food Protection Professional”.

== See also ==
- Dietitian
- Nutritionist
- Food guide pyramid
