= TM and Cult Mania =

1980 book by Michael Persinger

- Book cover
- Author: Michael Persinger, Normand Carrey, Lynn Suess
- Language: English
- Subject: Transcendental Meditation
- Genre: Psychology
- Publisher: Christopher Publishing House
- Publication date: 1980
- Publication place: United States
- Pages: 198
- ISBN: 0-8158-0392-3
- OCLC: 6582905
- Dewey Decimal: 158/.9 19
- LC Class: BF637.T68 P46

TM and Cult Mania is a non-fiction book that examines assertions made by the Transcendental Meditation movement (TM). The book is authored by Michael Persinger, Normand Carrey and Lynn Suess and published in 1980 by Christopher Publishing House. Persinger is a neurophysiologist and has worked out of Laurentian University. He trained as a psychologist and focused on the impacts of religious experience. Carrey is a medical doctor who specialized in psychiatry. He focused his studies into child psychiatry with research at Dalhousie University, and has taught physicians in a psychiatry residency program in the field of family therapy. Suess assisted Persinger in researching effects of geological phenomena on unidentified flying object sightings in Washington; the two conducted similar research in Toronto and Ottawa.

TM and Cult Mania analyzes the efficacy or lack thereof of the TM meditation process, concluding that it is, "no more effective than many other meditation techniques". The authors write that, "Transcendental Meditation has achieved international recognition through commercial exploitation" and "poor scientific procedures". The book notes that physiological changes observed due to partaking in TM methodology are very small. Persinger, Carrey, and Suess conclude in TM and Cult Mania, "science has been used as a sham for propaganda by the TM movement."

A positive capsule review in the Los Angeles Times noted that the authors use logic to point out transparencies in the assertions of Transcendental Meditation. John Horgan, in his book Rational Mysticism, questions Persinger's neutrality and says that in his book he treats religious beliefs and spiritual practices as mental illness.

== Authors ==
Michael Persinger is a neurophysiologist who has worked at Laurentian University in Greater Sudbury, Ontario, Canada. He trained as a psychologist and focused on the impacts of religious experience. Persinger is the author of the book Neuropsychological Basis of Human Belief, and since its publication he has researched and examined the physiological and neurological causes of religious belief systems. Normand Carrey received education as a medical doctor and specialized in psychiatry. He became a child psychiatrist, and worked out of Dalhousie University in Halifax, Canada. Carrey has conducted studies into psychological resilience, and has taught physicians in a psychiatry residency program in the field of family therapy. He has worked in the field of adolescent psychiatry at IWK Health Centre. Lynn Suess assisted Persinger in 1980, in researching geological phenomena which may have affected unidentified flying object sightings in Washington. Suess and Persinger performed similar research in Toronto and Ottawa.

== Contents ==
TM and Cult Mania takes a look at the assertions made by the Transcendental Meditation movement and analyzes them from a scientific perspective. The book acknowledges that those who practice the Transcendental Meditation technique feel relaxed and experience an increase in creativity. According to the book, the physiological effects reported by the scientific studies on Transcendental Meditation are relatively small from a scientific perspective and "no more effective than many other meditation techniques". Transcendental Meditation is seen as most noteworthy due to its ability to manipulate stress and expectancy.

"Transcendental Meditation has achieved international recognition through commercial exploitation" and "poor scientific procedures", write the authors. The book notes, "Frankly, the reported effects of TM upon human behavior are trivial. Considering the alleged potency of the TM procedure, the changes in physiological and behavioral measures are conspicuously minute." TM and Cult Mania comes to the conclusion that, "science has been used as a sham for propaganda by the TM movement."

== Reception ==
A capsule review of the book for the Los Angeles Times, Phil Freshman commented, "Using hard logic and crackling humor, a trio of Canadian laboratory researchers cogently deflates Transcendental Meditation; they spotlight transparencies in its claims and warn of its latent hazards to those in wobbly mental health." In his book Rational Mysticism, author John Horgan comments that although Persinger says he's neutral toward religious belief, he's more biased than other neurotheologians and that his two books "cast religious belief and spiritual practices in a psychopathological light".

== See also ==
- Cognitive science of religion
- Neurotheology
- Psychology of religion
- Religious experience
- Spiritual crisis
- Transpersonal psychology
