= God helmet =

Device alleged to alter consciousness

The God helmet is an experimental apparatus (originally called the Koren helmet) developed by neuropsychological researcher Stanley Koren and neuroscientist Michael Persinger to study creativity, religious experience and the effects of subtle stimulation of the temporal lobes. Reports by participants of a "sensed presence" while wearing the God helmet brought public attention and resulted in several TV documentaries. The device has been used in Persinger's research in the field of neurotheology, the study of the purported neural correlates of religion and spirituality. The apparatus, placed on the head of an experimental subject, generates very weak magnetic fields, that Persinger refers to as "complex". Like other neural stimulation with low-intensity magnetic fields, these fields are approximately as strong as those generated by a land line telephone handset or an ordinary hair dryer, but far weaker than that of an ordinary refrigerator magnet and approximately a million times weaker than transcranial magnetic stimulation.

Persinger reports that many subjects have reported "mystical experiences and altered states" while wearing the God Helmet. The foundations of his theory have been criticized in the scientific press. Anecdotal reports by journalists, academics and documentarists have been mixed and several effects reported by Persinger have not yet been independently replicated. One attempt at replication published in the scientific literature reported a failure to reproduce Persinger's effects and the authors speculated that the suggestibility of participants, improper blinding of participants or idiosyncratic methodology could explain Persinger's results. Persinger argues that the replication was technically flawed, but the researchers have stood by their replication. However, one group has published a direct replication of one God Helmet experiment. Other groups have reported no effects at all or have generated similar experiences by using sham helmets, or helmets that are not turned on. The research using sham equipment was marred by the fact that, in one case "... the data from the... study (using only a sham headset) had been faked", and "the student... (who did it)... was banned from the University."

== Development ==
The God Helmet was not specifically designed to elicit visions of God, but to test several of Persinger's hypotheses about brain function. The first of these is the Vectorial Hemisphericity Hypothesis, which proposes that the human sense of self has two components, one on each side of the brain, that ordinarily work together but in which the left hemisphere is usually dominant. Persinger argues that the two hemispheres make different contributions to a single sense of self, but under certain conditions can appear as two separate 'selves'. Persinger and Koren designed the God Helmet in an attempt to create conditions in which contributions to the sense of self from both cerebral hemispheres is disrupted.

The second experimental hypothesis was that when communication between the left and right senses of self is disturbed, as they report it is while wearing the God Helmet, the usually-subordinate 'self' in the right hemisphere intrudes into the awareness of the left-hemispheric dominant self, causing what Persinger refers to as "interhemispheric intrusions".

The third hypothesis was that "visitor experiences" could be explained by such "interhemispheric intrusions" caused by a disruption in "vectorial hemisphericity". Persinger theorises that many paranormal experiences, feelings of having lived past lives, felt presences of non-physical beings, ghosts, muses, and other "spiritual beings", are examples of interhemispheric intrusions (an idea originally proposed in 1976 in Julian Jaynes' bicameral mentality hypothesis).

The God Helmet experiments were also intended, though not specifically designed (see above), to validate the idea that religious and mystic experiences are artifacts of temporal lobe function.

== The device ==
Persinger uses a modified snowmobile helmet that incorporates solenoids placed over the temporal lobes. This device produces magnetic fields that Persinger describes as "weak but complex" (1 microtesla). The pattern of fluctuation in these magnetic fields is derived from physiological sources, for example patterns that appear in EEG traces taken from limbic structures. The purpose of exposing magnetic fields patterned after neurophysiological sources, such as the burst-firing profile of the amygdala, is to enhance the probability of activating the structure from which the signal was derived.

The sessions are conducted with the subject seated in an acoustic chamber. The acoustic chamber is also a Faraday cage, shielding out all EMF emissions and radiation except the Earth's magnetic field. Persinger reports that this shielding allows him to use the apparatus to investigate the effects of geomagnetism on the human brain.

=== Comparison with TMS ===
Neither the God Helmet, nor technologies derived from it, are examples of transcranial magnetic stimulation (TMS), which uses magnetic fields on the order of one million times stronger than those used in Persinger's lab. Despite this, Persinger reports similar effect sizes with his apparatus. The magnetic fields employed in TMS and in Persinger's experiments are also very different. TMS uses single, paired, and repetitive pulses of high intensity to penetrate the cranium. In contrast, Persinger's apparatus uses weak complex magnetic signals patterned after physiological processes, such as one derived from limbic burst firing.

== Experiences ==
Most reports from Persinger's lab consist of people sensing "presences"; people often interpreted these to be that of angels, a deceased being known to the subject, or a group of beings of some kind. There have also been reports in which the participant has experienced what they perceive as God. Persinger reports that "at least" 80 percent of his participants experience a presence beside them in the room, and others report less evocative experiences of "another consciousness or sentient being".

=== Anecdotal reports ===
The scientist and science writer Richard Dawkins, appearing in the BBC science documentary series Horizon, did not have a 'sensed presence' experience, but instead felt at times 'slightly dizzy', 'quite strange' and had sensations in his limbs and changes in his breathing. He summarised his experience as follows: "It pretty much felt as though I was in total darkness, with a helmet on my head and pleasantly relaxed". Persinger explained Dawkins' limited results in terms of his low score on a psychological scale measuring temporal lobe sensitivity.

In contrast, the experimental psychologist, and former parapsychology researcher, Susan Blackmore said: "When I went to Persinger's lab and underwent his procedures I had the most extraordinary experiences I've ever had… I'll be surprised if it turns out to be a placebo effect."

Jack Hitt, a journalist from Wired magazine, visited Persinger's lab in 1999 and expressed confusion over Persinger's post-stimulation debriefing ("One question: Did the red bulb on the wall grow larger or smaller? There was a red bulb on the wall? I hadn't noticed.") and reported: "Many other questions suggest that there were other experiences I should have had, but to be honest, I didn't. In fact, as transcendental experiences go, on a scale of 1 to 10, Persinger's helmet falls somewhere around, oh, 4. Even though I did have a fairly convincing out-of-body experience, I'm disappointed relative to the great expectations and anxieties I had going in."

== Replication attempts and debate ==
In December 2004 Nature reported that a group of Swedish researchers led by Pehr Granqvist, a psychologist at Uppsala University in Sweden, had attempted to replicate Persinger's experiments under double-blind conditions, and were not able to reproduce the effect. The study was published in Neuroscience Letters in 2005. Granqvist et al concluded that the presence or absence of the magnetic field had no relationship with any religious or spiritual experience reported by the participants, but was predicted entirely by their suggestibility and personality traits. Persinger, however, took issue with the Swedish attempt to replicate his work. "They didn't replicate it, not even close," he says. He argued that the Swedish group did not expose the subjects to magnetic fields for long enough to produce an effect. Granqvist et al. respond that Persinger agreed with their proposed methodology beforehand and they stand by their replication.

The theoretical basis for the God helmet, especially the connection between temporal lobe function and mystic experiences, has also been questioned.

Only one group unconnected to Persinger's lab has so far succeeded in replicating the effects of one of Persinger's early studies. They reported that their experiment had ruled out suggestibility as an explanation for Persinger's effects, and that analysis of their subjects' verbal reports revealed significant differences between the speech of subjects and controls, as well as less robust effects for suggestion and expectation.

Other groups have subsequently found that individual differences such as strong belief in the paranormal and magical ideation predict some alterations in consciousness and reported "exceptional experiences" when Persinger et al's experimental set-up and procedure are reproduced, but with a sham "God helmet" that is completely inert or a helmet that is turned off. These groups have concluded that psychological factors must have played an important role in prior experiments.

== Related devices and studies ==
Persinger and colleagues also developed a device nicknamed "The Octopus" which uses solenoids around the whole brain, in a circle just above a subject's ears. Commercial versions of the God helmet, Octopus and associated devices are sold by Persinger's research associate Todd Murphy, and he reports that his devices are able to modulate emotional states in addition to enhancing meditation and generating altered states. One experiment found no changes in emotional responses to photographs whether the device was on or off, Persinger and colleagues report significant changes in subjects' EEG during stimulation with a Shakti system. In one report by Persinger's lab, published in the fringe journal NeuroQuantology, these changes were correlated with an out-of-body experience.

One published attempt to test Persinger's theories regarding the psychological effects of environmental magnetic fields, used whole-body exposure to magnetic fields and ultrasound in freely-moving participants to create a "haunted room" within which it was hoped subjects would sense a "presence". The study found that reports of unusual experiences were unrelated with the presence or absence of "complex" environmental electromagnetic fields similar to Persinger's. They speculated that the effects were likely due to suggestibility, though they did not directly measure it.

== See also ==
- Neuroepistemology
- Third Man factor
- Bicameral mentality
