= Charles Laughlin =

American neuroanthropologist

Charles D. Laughlin Jr. (born 1938) is an American neuroanthropologist known primarily for having co-founded a school of neuroanthropological theory called "biogenetic structuralism." Laughlin is an emeritus professor of anthropology and religion at Carleton University in Ottawa, Canada.

== Biography ==
Following service in the American Air Force, Laughlin completed his undergraduate work in anthropology with a concentration in philosophy at San Francisco State University. He then did graduate work in anthropology at the University of Oregon, beginning in 1966. His doctoral dissertation was based on fieldwork conducted among a small tribe in northeast Uganda called the So (a.k.a. Tepeth, Tepes; see Laughlin and Allgeier 1979). Laughlin's choice of the So was influenced by conversations he had with Colin Turnbull, who had worked with nearby peoples. Laughlin completed his dissertation, Economics and Social Organization among the So of Northeastern Uganda, and received his Ph.D. in 1972 while he was assistant professor of anthropology at the State University of New York at Oswego. He continued his studies during a postdoctoral fellowship at the Institute of Neurological Sciences at the University of Pennsylvania.

== Work ==
While teaching at Oswego, Laughlin pursued his interest in the neurobiological bases of human sociality, which led to his developing, in collaboration with Eugene G. d'Aquili of the University of Pennsylvania, the theory of biogenetic structuralism—a perspective that sought to merge the structuralism of Claude Lévi-Strauss with neuroscience. Laughlin and his colleagues, first at SUNY Oswego and later at Carleton University, continued to develop biogenetic structuralism and applied it to gain insight into a wide range of human social phenomena, including ritual, myth, science, consciousness, and transpersonal experience (see Laughlin 1991).

While the perspective itself is not yet used by most anthropologists, it has sparked a number of debates inside symbolic anthropology and has influenced a number of researchers (e.g., Winkelman 2000, Dissanayake 1988, Victor Turner 1983). He is also one of the founders of a discipline known as transpersonal anthropology, concerned with the relationship between culture and altered states of consciousness. His interest in this field stemmed from his own personal experiences after being exposed to meditation in various disciplines and years as a monk within the Sakya tradition of Tibetan Buddhism. While a student at Oregon, a professor advised him to study Zen Buddhism. In the 1990s, he studied the state of consciousness known by the Navajo as "hózhó", and compared this with Buddhist altered states of consciousness, such as satori or kensho. He has published widely in journals on religious systems and transpersonal studies. Laughlin has written a comprehensive study of the anthropology of dreaming.

=== Neurognosis ===
Neurognosis is a technical term used in biogenetic structuralism to refer to the initial organization of the experiencing and cognizing brain.

All neurophysiological models comprising an individual's cognized environment develop from these nascent models which exist as the initial, genetically determined neural structures already producing the experience of the fetus and infant. These nascent models are referred to as neurognostic structures, neurognostic models, or simply neurognosis.

When theorists wish to emphasize the neurognostic structures themselves, they may be referred to as structures (in the structuralist sense) or models. The neurognostic structures correspond somewhat to Carl Jung's archetypes. Jung's reference to the essential unknowability of the archetypes-in-themselves also applies to neurognostic structures in biogenetic structural formulations.

Neurognosis may also refer to the functioning of these neural structures in producing either experience or some other activity unconscious to the individual. This usage is similar to Jung's reference to archetypal imagery, ideas, and activities that emerge into and are active in consciousness.

The distinction between neurognostic structures and neurognosis is simply one between structure and function—for example, between the anatomy of the hand and grasping by that hand.

== See also ==
- Neurophenomenology

== Bibliography ==
- Laughlin, Charles D. and Eugene d'Aquili. 1974. Biogenetic Structuralism. New York, NY: Columbia University Press.
- Laughlin, Charles D. and Ivan Brady, eds. 1978. Extinction and Survival in Human Populations. New York, NY: Columbia University Press.
- d'Aquili, Eugene, Charles D. Laughlin and John McManus, eds. 1979. The Spectrum of Ritual. New York: Columbia University Press.
- Laughlin, Charles D., Eugene d'Aquili, and John McManus. 1990. Brain, Symbol and Experience: Toward a Neurophenomenology of Consciousness. New York: Columbia University Press.
- Laughlin, Charles D. 1993. Transpersonal anthropology. In R. Walsh & F. Vaughan (Eds.) Paths Beyond Ego. Los Angeles: Tarcher.
- Laughlin, Charles D. (2011) Communing with the Gods: Consciousness, Culture and the Dreaming Brain. Brisbane: Daily Grail.
- Rubinstein, Robert A., Charles D. Laughlin and John McManus. 1984. Science as Cognitive Process: Toward an Empirical Philosophy of Science. Philadelphia, PA: University of Pennsylvania Press.
