= Michael Persinger =

American-Canadian professor of psychology

- Born: June 26, 1945; Jacksonville, Florida, U.S.
- Died: August 14, 2018 (aged 73); Sudbury, Ontario, Canada
- Citizenship: Canadian; American
- Education: University of Wisconsin; University of Tennessee; University of Manitoba
- Known for: Director of Laurentian University's Consciousness Research Laboratory. Notable for his work in the field of neurotheology.
- Awards: LIFT (Leader in Faculty Teaching), 2007 TVO (Ontario) Best Lecturer 2007; Laurentian University Research Excellence Award 1989 Sudbury Regional Brain Injury Association Lifetime Membership Award 2001
- Scientific career
- Fields: Neurotheology, Neuroscience, Parapsychology, Biophysics, Geophysics, Epilepsy
- Workplaces: Laurentian University

Michael A. Persinger (June 26, 1945 – August 14, 2018) was an American-Canadian professor of psychology at Laurentian University, a position he had held from 1971 until his death in 2018. His best-known hypotheses include the temporal lobes of the human brain as the central correlate for mystical experiences, subtle changes in geomagnetic activity as mediators of parapsychological phenomena, the tectonic strain within the Earth's crust as the source of luminous phenomena attributed to unidentified aerial objects, and the importance of specific quantifications for energy (10^{−20} Joules), photon flux density, and small shifts in magnetic field intensities for integrating cellular activity as well as human thought with universal phenomena.

Persinger's experimental work on paranormal experiences has received widespread media coverage but has also been widely criticised. His major research themes have included electromagnetic field effects upon biological organisms, epilepsy, temporal lobe functions, properties of biophotons, geophysical-human interactions, physical cosmology, and the quantifiable examination of what Persinger terms "low-probability phenomena" such as time travel, parallel universes, and the universe as a simulation. He has published over 500 technical articles in scientific journals (many in predatory journals), more than a dozen chapters in various books, and seven of his own books. His book with Ghislaine Lafreniere, entitled Space-Time Transients and Unusual Events (1977), documents the search for patterns in phenomena that are not compatible with current scientific paradigms.

He argued that all phenomena including consciousness, spiritual experiences, and "paranormal events" can be explained by universal physical mechanisms and can be verified using the scientific method. Further, he has claimed that the structure and function of the brain determine the boundaries of human perception of the universe, and that shared quantitative values connect local phenomena with fundamental properties of the cosmos.

== Early life ==
Persinger attended Carroll College from 1963 to 1964 and graduated from the University of Wisconsin–Madison in 1967. He received his M.A. in physiological psychology from the University of Tennessee in 1969 and his Ph.D. from the University of Manitoba in 1971.

== Research and academic work ==
Persinger's work focuses on the commonalities that exist between the sciences, and aims to integrate fundamental concepts of various branches of science. He organized the Behavioral Neuroscience Program at Laurentian University in Sudbury, Ontario, integrating chemistry, biology, and psychology. Persinger has published hundreds of peer-reviewed academic journal articles.

=== Clinical and experimental neuropsychology ===
Most of Persinger's published articles involved with consciousness have focused on the persistence of experiences reported by individuals who display complex partial epilepsy within the normal population of people who are creative, subject to frequent paranormal experiences, or who have sustained a mild impact of mechanical energy to the cerebrum. One of his notable experiments, spanning about three decades, involved a helmet ("the God Helmet"), whereby weak physiologically-patterned magnetic fields were applied across the temporal lobes of hundreds of volunteers. The research received wide media coverage with high-profile visitors to Persinger's laboratory including Susan Blackmore and Richard Dawkins reporting positive and negative results respectively.

Experiences often associated with mystical reports such as out-of-body-experiences, intrusive thoughts, and the sensed presence were reported by hundreds of volunteers over decades of studying the phenomenon, which were not associated with the subjects' suggestibility. Subsequent theory and quantitative electroencephalographic measurements supported the contention that the sensed presence of a "sentient being" could be a normal brain-based prototype for god experiences or related mystical phenomena and was actually the left hemispheric awareness of the right hemispheric equivalent to the left hemispheric sense of self. Similar experiences were reported by people who had applied Todd Murphy's technology. However, other researchers either could not replicate or only partially replicated the experimental effects with variations of the helmet. In 2014, Tinoco and colleagues reported an independent replication of an experimental protocol which measured verbal behavior associated with field exposures using the helmet configuration. In an earlier study by Richards and colleagues, semantic memory was similarly affected by applications of weak magnetic fields over the temporal lobes.

Regarding Persinger's claims, the psychologist Richard Wiseman has written they have not been replicated and the "scientific jury is unconvinced". The research has also been criticized by psychologist Craig Aaen-Stockdale, writing in The Psychologist. Other researchers have criticized Persinger for insufficient double-blinding and argued that there was no physiologically plausible mechanism by which his device could affect the brain. Persinger responded that the researchers had an incorrect computer setup and that many of his previous experiments were indeed carried out double-blind. Both claims are disputed.

=== Geophysical and human interaction research ===
One of Persinger's lifelong endeavors has been to establish a mechanism underlying geophysical-behavioral correlates using experimental simulations. The Tectonic Strain Theory (TST) developed by Persinger and John S. Derr predicted that luminous phenomena and associated physical effects were produced by manifestations of tectonic strain that often precede by weeks to months seismic events within the region. Persinger argues that the labeling of these manifestations such as unidentified flying objects (UFOs) has changed over the centuries and reflects the characteristics of the culture despite a common mechanism. The support for the theory was primarily correlational. Persinger considered the temporal contiguity of reports of unidentified luminous phenomena preceding local seismicity due to injections of fluids a quasi-experimental support for the hypothesis. Alternative models, developed by Persinger and David Vares, were quantified for interaction between quantum values and specific magnitude earthquakes, global climate variations, interactions with population densities, discrete energies as mediators of disease, and processes by which human cognition could be covertly affected by Schumann Resonances and geomagnetic activity.

=== Parapsychological research ===
Persinger has stated that he studies parapsychological phenomena because "the ultimate subject matter of science is the unknown". He believes that verifiable spontaneous and experimental types of parapsychological phenomena are physical and associated with non-local interactions between human brain activity and geophysical processes. For example, he claimed that the moderate strength correlation between geomagnetic activity at the time of a precognitive experience and what the geomagnetic activity would be two to three days before the event indicated that energetic antecedents before the event, not the event itself, was being discerned. During the 1980s, Persinger stated that both experimental and spontaneous cases of "telepathy and clairvoyance ("remote viewing") were more likely when the global geomagnetic activity was lower than the days before or afterwards. Measurement of the brain activity of "psychic" individuals such as Ingo Swann and Sean Harribance revealed unusual electrical brain patterns in the right hemisphere (parahippocampal region), increased photon emissions from the right cerebral hemisphere, and small decreases in the intensity of the geomagnetic field when the details of their experiences were most accurate.

== Conduct controversy at Laurentian University ==
In 2016, Persinger was controversially removed as the instructor of a first-year psychology course. Laurentian's provost objected to Persinger's having asked students to sign a statement of understanding that vulgar language might be used in the class. The statement included examples such as "the F-word, homophobic slurs and offensive slang for genitalia".

One of my techniques is to expose people to all types of different words . . . silly words, complex words, emotional words, profane words. Because they influence how you make decisions and how you think.

The Laurentian University Faculty Association filed a grievance against the school for violating Persinger's academic freedom. Current and former students also protested the administration's decision. The grievance was heard on October 30, 2019, in Toronto, Ontario and on November 6, 2019, a decision was rendered by Arbitrator Kevin Burkett that Dr. Persinger was improperly removed from teaching PSYC 1105 EL in December 2015. As a result of Dr. Persinger's grievance, "In the future, Laurentian University is required to engage in a consultative process which shall include full consideration of the Collective Agreement principles including academic freedom, health and safety of the University Community, the rights, responsibilities and duties of academics and the right to a full and proper investigation".

== Death ==
Persinger died on August 14, 2018, at the age of 73.

== Books and select publications ==
- Persinger, Michael (1974). ELF and VLF electromagnetic field effects. New York: Plenum Press. ISBN 978-0-306-30826-0.
- Persinger, Michael (1974). The paranormal. New York: MSS Information Corp. ISBN 978-0-8422-5212-6.
- Persinger, Michael (1977). Space-time transients and unusual events. Chicago: Nelson-Hall. ISBN 978-0-88229-334-9.
- Persinger, Michael (1980). The weather matrix and human behavior. New York: Praeger. ISBN 978-0-03-057731-4.
- Persinger, Michael (1980). TM and Cult Mania. North Quincy Mass.: Christopher Pub. House. ISBN 978-0-8158-0392-8.
- Persinger, Michael (1987). Neuropsychological bases of God beliefs. Westport: Praeger. ISBN 978-0-275-92648-9.
- Persinger, Michael (1988). Climate, buildings and behaviour. Winnipeg: Institute of Winnipeg. ISBN 978-0-920213-60-5.
- Persinger, Michael; Dadsetan, Parirokh; Jahangiri, Hamideh (2020). Encyclopedia of Psychological Testing, Assessment & Treatment Volume 1 (A-L). Latvia, European Union: Scholar's Press. ISBN 978-613-8-94244-3.
- Persinger, Michael; Dadsetan, Parirokh; Jahangiri, Hamideh (2020). Encyclopedia of Psychological Testing, Assessment & Treatment Volume 2 (M-Z). Latvia, European Union: Scholar's Press. ISBN 978-613-8-93134-8.

== See also ==
- Electromagnetic theories of consciousness
- Neurotheology
