= Unverified personal gnosis =

Belief gained through personal experience

Unverified personal gnosis (UPG), sometimes referred to as subjective personal gnosis, is said to be spiritual belief gained through personal experience or intuition that cannot be attributed to or corroborated by received tradition, professional scholarship, or direct citation in an accepted religious text. The term is used primarily within polytheist reconstructionisms and other Neopagan communities.

UPG purportedly comes about when an individual gains an understanding of a god, spirit, myth, or ritual by means of intuition or the experience of communication with a non-human entity. Such communication can take place through various forms, such as dreams, ecstatic states, and divination. Phenomenologically, it is identical to "magical consciousness" as described by Susan Greenwood (see below) and has also been referred to in anthropological literature as "extraordinary experience".

== In Western polytheism ==
Within polytheist reconstructionism, UPG is contrasted to textual knowledge, which comes from ancient texts or artifacts, or from secondary scholarship; and community knowledge, which may be received tradition, agreed-upon practice, or mutual corroboration of multiple peoples' personal gnoses. Because reconstructionists attempt to rebuild pre-Christian religious and spiritual practices based on texts, archaeology, and historical research, some practitioners find UPG to be counter to the point or excessively permissive. Others argue that because so much information about ancient practices is lost or inconclusive, it is a necessary aspect of reviving them in the modern world.

== In anthropology of religion ==
UPG aligns with what anthropologist Susan Greenwood calls "magical consciousness". In this mode, often but not always enabled by a deliberately induced trance state, a person experiences awareness of and participation with other consciousnesses. These other consciousnesses are understood in terms of the experiencer's cultural setting, often as separate beings but also as aspects of the self or larger patterns of which the self is a small part. Greenwood describes magical consciousness as other than analytical knowledge, and observes that such experiences are often not well expressed verbally. Importantly, the experiences may be involuntary—one does not necessarily consciously direct them, and may experience unexpected events or sensations. In reconstructionist communities, UPG is particular in that it is specifically delineated as "unverified"—that is, the subjectivity of the experience is highlighted, although the experience itself is not questioned.
