= Andrew B. Newberg =

American neuroscientist (born 1966)

Andrew Newberg
- Born: 1966 (age 59–60)
- Citizenship: American
- Education: Haverford College (B.A.); University of Pennsylvania (M.D.)
- Scientific career
- Fields: Neuroscience, neurotheology, psychiatry, internal medicine, radiology, neuroimaging, religious studies
- Workplaces: University of Pennsylvania; Thomas Jefferson University

Andrew Newberg is an American neuroscientist who is a professor in the Department of Integrative Medicine and Nutritional Sciences and the director of research at the Marcus Institute of Integrative Health at Thomas Jefferson University Hospital, previously an adjunct professor of religious studies and a lecturer in psychology in the Biological Basis of Behavior Program at the University of Pennsylvania.

He has been a prominent researcher in the field of nuclear medical brain imaging and neurotheology. In particular, his research has focused on the development of neurotransmitter tracers for the evaluation of religiosity as well as neurological and psychiatric disorders including clinical depression, head injury, Alzheimer's disease, and Parkinson's disease.

== Academic research ==
In the early 1990s, he began to research the intersection between the brain and religious and spiritual experiences. In this work, also sometimes referred to as "neurotheology", Newberg described the possible neurophysiological mechanisms associated with religious and spiritual experiences. His initial research included the use of functional brain imaging to study Buddhist meditators and Franciscan nuns in prayer. He has continued to study religious and spiritual phenomena including topics related to forgiveness, meditation, prayer, spiritual development, morality, and belief. This work has been incorporated more recently into a new Center for Spirituality and the Mind at the University of Pennsylvania.

=== Absolute unitary being ===
In this context, Newberg has also been discussed by later scholars as having used, together with Eugene G. d'Aquili, the expression absolute unitary being as a phenomenological descriptor for subjectively reported mystical experiences marked by the disappearance of perceived self–world boundaries, rather than as an ontological claim about reality itself.

== Literary activities ==
Newberg is the author of ten books (translated into 16 languages), and over 200 articles on neuroimaging in neuropsychiatric disorders and also on neuroscience and religion. His book, Why God Won't Go Away, is a popularized account of this topic which describes some of the brain imaging studies and his theories regarding the nature of religious and spiritual experiences. Why We Believe What We Believe, co-authored with Mark Robert Waldman (Executive MBA Faculty, Loyola Marymount University) describes the relationship between the brain and beliefs and also describes brain imaging studies of an atheist and individuals speaking in tongues (or glossolalia). A more recent book, How Enlightenment Changes Your Brain, also co-authored with Waldman, is a scientific and practical look at how faith and meditation can enhance brain function. Steering away from the topic of faith, his latest book, co-authored with Mark Waldman, Words Can Change Your Brain describes how a research-based communication practice, "compassionate communication", can be used to improve brain health and interpersonal communication. The book and communication strategies are now part of the NeuroLeadership course offered in the EMBA program at Loyola Marymount University. The communication strategies have been documented and published in the Journal of Executive Education.

== Media appearances ==
Newberg's research has been featured in Newsweek, the Los Angeles Times, and the New Scientist. He has been a guest speaker at the Forum at Grace Cathedral and appeared in the films What the Bleep Do We Know!? and Religulous.

== Reception ==
From the religious studies perspective, concerns have been raised that Newberg's focus on specific practices such as meditation does not necessarily generalize to the full spectrum of religious and spiritual phenomena. From skeptics’ viewpoints, his decision not to reduce religion entirely to brain function has also attracted critique, with some arguing that his findings do not fully clarify the nature of religious experience.

Clinical Psychologist Derrick L. Hessert contend that Newberg's attempt to outline foundational principles for neurotheology can be overly ambitious and abstract, proposing a very broad set of ideas that some find difficult to operationalize or support with current evidence.

== Works ==
- d'Aquili, Eugene G.; Newberg, Andrew B. (August 1, 2010). Principles of Neurotheology (paperback). Ashgate. ISBN 978-0-7546-6994-4.
- d'Aquili, Eugene G.; Newberg, Andrew B. (August 1, 1999). The Mystical Mind: Probing the Biology of Religious Experience (paperback). Fortress Press. ISBN 978-0-8006-3163-5.
- Newberg, Andrew B.; d'Aquili, Eugene G.; Rause, Vince (March 1, 2002). Why God Won't Go Away: Brain Science and the Biology of Belief (paperback). Ballantine Books. ISBN 978-0-345-44034-1.
- Newberg, Andrew B.; Waldman, Mark Robert (September 12, 2006). Why We Believe What We Believe: Our Biological Need for Meaning, Spirituality, and Truth (hardcover). Free Press. ISBN 978-0-7432-7497-5.
- Newberg, Andrew B.; Waldman, Mark Robert (March 24, 2009). How God Changes Your Brain: Breakthrough Findings from a Leading Neuroscientist (hardcover). Ballantine Books. ISBN 978-0-345-50341-1.
- Newberg, Andrew (2010). Principles of Neurotheology. Farnham, Surrey, England: Ashgate Publishing. ISBN 978-1-4094-0810-9.
- Newberg, Andrew B.; Waldman, Mark Robert (July 14, 2012). Words Can Change Your Brain: 12 Conversation Strategies to Build Trust, Resolve Conflict, and Increase Intimacy (hardcover). Hudson Street Press. ISBN 978-1-594-63090-3.
- Newberg, Andrew B.; Waldman, Mark Robert (March 15, 2016). How Enlightenment Changes Your Brain: The New Science of Transformation (hardcover). Avery. ISBN 978-1594633454.
- Newberg, Andrew B. (March 27, 2018). Neurotheology: How Science Can Enlighten Us About Spirituality (hardcover). Columbia University Press. ISBN 978-0231179041.
- Newberg, Andrew B.; Halpern, David (October 23, 2018). The Rabbi's Brain: Mystics, Moderns and the Science of Jewish Thinking (hardcover). Turner. ISBN 978-1683367130.
- Newberg, Andrew B. (August 6, 2024). Sex, God, and the Brain: How Sexual Pleasure Gave Birth to Religion and a Whole Lot More (paperback). Turner. ISBN 978-1684428625.
