= Mystical or religious experience =

Experience interpreted within a religious framework

A mystical or religious experience, also known as a spiritual experience or sacred experience, is a subjective experience which is interpreted within a religious framework. In a strict sense, "mystical experience" refers specifically to an ecstatic unitive experience, or nonduality, of 'self' and other objects, but more broadly may also refer to non-sensual or unconceptualized sensory awareness or insight, while religious experience may refer to any experience relevant in a religious context. (Note: William James: "In mystic states we both become one with the Absolute and we become aware of our oneness.) Mysticism entails religious traditions of human transformation aided by various practices and religious experiences. (Note: Gellman: "Typically, mystics, theistic or not, see their mystical experience as part of a larger undertaking aimed at human transformation (See, for example, Teresa of Avila, Life, Chapter 19) and not as the terminus of their efforts. Thus, in general, 'mysticism' would best be thought of as a constellation of distinctive practices, discourses, texts, institutions, traditions, and experiences aimed at human transformation, variously defined in different traditions." According to Evelyn Underhill, mysticism is "the science or art of the spiritual life." (Note: Original quote in "Evelyn Underhill (1930), Mysticism: A Study in the Nature and Development of Spiritual Consciousness.) (Note: Underhill: "One of the most abused words in the English language, it has been used in different and often mutually exclusive senses by religion, poetry, and philosophy: has been claimed as an excuse for every kind of occultism, for dilute transcendentalism, vapid symbolism, religious or aesthetic sentimentality, and bad metaphysics. on the other hand, it has been freely employed as a term of contempt by those who have criticized these things. It is much to be hoped that it may be restored sooner or later to its old meaning, as the science or art of the spiritual life.")) (Note: According to Waaijman, the traditional meaning of spirituality is a process of re-formation which "aims to recover the original shape of man, the image of God. To accomplish this, the re-formation is oriented at a mold, which represents the original shape: in Judaism the Torah, in Christianity Christ, in Buddhism Buddha, in the Islam Muhammad." Waaijman uses the word "omvorming", "to change the form". Different translations are possible: transformation, re-formation, trans-mutation. Waaijman points out that "spirituality" is only one term of a range of words which denote the praxis of spirituality. Some other terms are "Hasidism, contemplation, kabbala, asceticism, mysticism, perfection, devotion and piety".)

The concept of mystical or religious experience developed in the 19th century, as a defense against the growing rationalism of western society. William James popularized the notion of distinct religious or mystical experiences (Note: The term "mystical experience" has become synonymous with the terms "religious experience", spiritual experience and sacred experience.) in his Varieties of Religious Experience, (Note: Jerome Gellman, Mysticism, Stanford Encyclopedia of Philosophy) and influenced the understanding of mysticism as a distinctive experience which supplies knowledge of the transcendental.

The interpretation of mystical experiences is a matter of debate. According to James, mystical experiences have four defining qualities, namely ineffability, noetic quality (access to special truth/knowledge), transiency, and passivity. According to Rudolf Otto, the broader category of numinous experiences have two qualities, namely mysterium tremendum, which is the tendency to invoke fear and trembling; and mysterium fascinans, the tendency to attract, fascinate and compel. Perennialists like William James and Aldous Huxley regard mystical experiences to share a common core, pointing to one universal transcendental reality, for which those experiences offer the proof. R. C. Zaehner (1913–1974) rejected the perennialist position, instead discerning three fundamental types of mysticism following Dasgupta, namely theistic, monistic, and panenhenic ("all-in-one") or natural mysticism. Walter Terence Stace criticised Zaehner, instead postulating two types following Otto, namely extroverted (unity in diversity) and introverted ('pure consciousness') mysticism.

The perennial position is "largely dismissed by scholars" but "has lost none of its popularity." Instead, a constructionist approach became dominant during the 1970s, which also rejects the neat typologies of Zaehner and Stace, and states that mystical experiences are mediated by pre-existing frames of reference, while the attribution approach focuses on the (religious) meaning that is attributed to specific events.

Correlates between mystical experiences and neurological activity have been established, pointing to the temporal lobe as the main locus for these experiences, while Andrew B. Newberg and Eugene G. d'Aquili have also pointed to the parietal lobe. Recent research points to the relevance of the default mode network, while the anterior insula seems to play a role in the ineffability subjective certainty induced by mystical experiences.

== Terminology ==
=== Mystical or religious experience ===
The terms "mystical experience," "religious experience", spiritual experience and sacred experience have become synonyms, all referring to non-ordinary, numinous, subjective experiences which are typically interpreted in a religious framework. "Mystical experience" may specifically refers to unitive or nondual experiences, but may also more broadly refer to non-sensual or unconceptualized sensory awareness or insight, while religious experience may refer to any experience relevant in a religious context. Jones and Gellman note that "few classical mystics refer to their experiences as the union of two realities: there is no literal 'merging' or 'absorption' of one reality into another resulting in only one entity." According to them,

A more inclusive definition of "mystical experience" is: A purportedly nonsensory awareness or a nonstructured sensory experience granting acquaintance of realities or states of affairs that are of a kind not accessible by way of ordinary sense-perception structured by mental conceptions, somatosensory modalities, or standard introspection.

Experiences like visions, near death experiences and parapsychological phenomena are excluded from this definition of "mystical experience," but may be regarded as "religious experiences."

=== Mysticism ===
Mysticism as a historical religious tradition relates primarily to Christian mysticism, and involves more than "mystical experience". According to Gellman, the ultimate goal of mysticism is human transformation, not just experiencing mystical or visionary states. According to McGinn, personal transformation is the essential criterion to determine the authenticity of Christian mysticism. (Note: McGinn: "This is why the only test that Christianity has known for determining the authenticity of a mystic and her or his message has been that of personal transformation, both on the mystic's part and—especially—on the part of those whom the mystic has affected.)

Gellman notes that the so-called mystical experience is not a transitional event, as William James claimed, but an "abiding consciousness, accompanying a person throughout the day, or parts of it. For that reason, it might be better to speak of mystical consciousness, which can be either fleeting or abiding." Parsons stresses the importance of distinguishing between temporary experiences and mysticism as a process, which is embodied within a "religious matrix" of texts and practices. (Note: Parsons: "...episodic experience and mysticism as a process that, though surely punctuated by moments of visionary, unitive, and transformative encounters, is ultimately inseparable from its embodied relation to a total religious matrix: liturgy, scripture, worship, virtues, theology, rituals, practice and the arts.) Richard Jones does the same.

=== Related terms ===
- Ecstasy, trance – In ecstasy the believer is understood to have a soul or spirit which can leave the body. In ecstasy the focus is on the soul leaving the body and to experience transcendental realities. This type of religious experience is characteristic for the shaman.
- Enthusiasm – In enthusiasm – or possession – God is understood to be outside, other than or beyond the believer. A sacred power, being or will enters the body or mind of an individual and possesses it. A person capable of being possessed is sometimes called a medium. The deity, spirit or power uses such a person to communicate to the immanent world. Lewis argues that ecstasy and possession are basically one and the same experience, ecstasy being merely one form which possession may take. The outward manifestation of the phenomenon is the same in that shamans appear to be possessed by spirits, act as their mediums, and even though they claim to have mastery over them, can lose that mastery.
- Spiritual awakening – A spiritual awakening usually involves a realization or opening to a sacred dimension of reality and may be a religious experience. Often a spiritual awakening has lasting effects upon one's life. It may refer to any of a wide range of experiences including being born again, near-death experiences, Liberation (moksha), and Enlightenment (bodhi).
- Dan Merkur makes a distinction between trance states and reverie states. (Note: Dan Merkur, Mysticism, Encyclopædia Britannica) According to Merkur, in trance states the normal functions of consciousness are temporarily inhibited, and trance experiences are not filtered by ordinary judgements, and seem to be real and true. In reverie states, numinous experiences are also not inhibited by the normal functions of consciousness, but visions and insights are still perceived as being in need of interpretation, while trance states may lead to a denial of physical reality.

== "Experience" as a hermeneutic category ==
=== The concept of mystical or religious experience ===
The concept of mystical or religious experience originated in the 19th century, as a defense against the growing rationalism of western society. Wayne Proudfoot traces the roots of the notion of "religious experience" to the German theologian Friedrich Schleiermacher (1768–1834), who argued that religion is based on a feeling of the infinite. The notion of "religious experience" was used by Schleiermacher to defend religion against the growing scientific and secular critique. It was adopted by many scholars of religion, of which William James was the most influential.

The origins of the use of this term can also be dated further back. In the 18th, 19th, and 20th centuries, several historical figures put forth very influential views that religion and its beliefs can be grounded in experience itself. While Kant held that moral experience justified religious beliefs, John Wesley in addition to stressing individual moral exertion thought that the religious experiences in the Methodist movement (paralleling the Romantic Movement) were foundational to religious commitment as a way of life.

==== William James ====
William James popularized the notion of "mystical experience" in his The Varieties of Religious Experience. James wrote:

In mystic states we both become one with the Absolute and we become aware of our oneness. This is the everlasting and triumphant mystical tradition, hardly altered by differences of clime or creed. In Hinduism, in Neoplatonism, in Sufism, in Christian mysticism, in Whitmanism, we find the same recurring note, so that there is about mystical utterances an eternal unanimity which ought to make a critic stop and think, and which bring it about that the mystical classics have, as has been said, neither birthday nor native land. (Note: James also gives descriptions of conversion experiences. The Christian model of dramatic conversions, based on the role-model of Paul's conversion, may also have served as a model for Western interpretations and expectations regarding "enlightenment", similar to Protestant influences on Theravada Buddhism, as described by Carrithers: "It rests upon the notion of the primacy of religious experiences, preferably spectacular ones, as the origin and legitimation of religious action. But this presupposition has a natural home, not in Buddhism, but in Christian and especially Protestant Christian movements which prescribe a radical conversion." See Sekida for an example of this influence of William James and Christian conversion stories, mentioning Luther and St. Paul. See also McMahan for the influence of Christian thought on Buddhism.)

This book is the classic study on religious or mystical experience, which influenced deeply both the academic and popular understanding of "religious experience". James popularized the use of the term "religious experience" in his Varieties, and influenced the understanding of mysticism as a distinctive experience which supplies knowledge of the transcendental:

Under the influence of William James' The Varieties of Religious Experience, heavily centered on people's conversion experiences, most philosophers' interest in mysticism has been in distinctive, allegedly knowledge-granting "mystical experiences."

==== Other authors ====
Other scholars and writers of the nineteenth and twentieth centuries also began their studies on the historical and psychological descriptive analysis of the mystical experience, by investigating examples and categorizing it into types. Early notable examples include the study of the term "cosmic consciousness" by Edward Carpenter (1892) and psychiatrist Richard Bucke (in his book Cosmic Consciousness, 1901); the definition of "oceanic feeling" by Romain Rolland (1927) and its study by Freud; Rudolf Otto's description of the "numinous" (1917) and its studies by Jung; Friedrich von Hügel in The Mystical Element of Religion (1908); Evelyn Underhill in her work Mysticism (1911); Aldous Huxley in The Perennial Philosophy (1945).

=== Influence ===
The concept of "mystical experience" has influenced the understanding of specific subjective experiences as a distinctive experiences which supply knowledge of a transcendental reality, cosmic unity, or ultimate truths. (Note: McClenon: "The doctrine that special mental states or events allow an understanding of ultimate truths. Although it is difficult to differentiate which forms of experience allow such understandings, mental episodes supporting belief in "other kinds of reality" are often labeled mystical [...] Mysticism tends to refer to experiences supporting belief in a cosmic unity rather than the advocation of a particular religious ideology." (Note: James McClenon, Mysticism, Encyclopedia of Religion and Society))

A broad range of western and eastern movements have incorporated and influenced the emergence of the modern notion of "mystical experience", such as the Perennial philosophy, Transcendentalism, Universalism, the Theosophical Society, New Thought, Neo-Vedanta and Buddhist modernism.

==== Perennial philosophy ====
According to the Perennial philosophy, the mystical experiences in all religions are essentially the same. It supposes that many, if not all of the world's great religions, have arisen around the teachings of mystics, including Buddha, Jesus, Lao Tze, and Krishna. It also sees most religious traditions describing fundamental mystical experience, at least esoterically. A major proponent in the 20th century was Aldous Huxley, who "was heavily influenced in his description by Vivekananda's neo-Vedanta and the idiosyncratic version of Zen exported to the west by D.T. Suzuki. Both of these thinkers expounded their versions of the perennialist thesis", which they originally received from western thinkers and theologians.

==== Transcendentalism and Unitarian Universalism ====
Transcendentalism was an early 19th-century liberal Protestant movement, which was rooted in English and German Romanticism, the Biblical criticism of Herder and Schleiermacher, and the skepticism of Hume. The Transcendentalists emphasised an intuitive, experiential approach of religion. Following Schleiermacher, an individual's intuition of truth was taken as the criterion for truth. In the late 18th and early 19th century, the first translations of Hindu texts appeared, which were also read by the Transcendentalists, and influenced their thinking. They also endorsed universalist and Unitarianist ideas, leading to Unitarian Universalism, the idea that there must be truth in other religions as well, since a loving God would redeem all living beings, not just Christians.

==== Theosophical Society ====
The Theosophical Society was formed in 1875 by Helena Blavatsky, Henry Steel Olcott, William Quan Judge and others to advance the spiritual principles and search for Truth known as Theosophy. The Theosophical Society has been highly influential in promoting interest, both in west and east, in a great variety of religious teachings:

No single organization or movement has contributed so many components to the New Age Movement as the Theosophical Society ... It has been the major force in the dissemination of occult literature in the West in the twentieth century.

The Theosophical Society searched for 'secret teachings' in Asian religions. It has been influential on modernist streams in several Asian religions, notably Hindu reform movements, the revival of Theravada Buddhism, and D.T. Suzuki, who popularized the idea of enlightenment as insight into a timeless, transcendent reality. Another example can be seen in Paul Brunton's A Search in Secret India, which introduced Ramana Maharshi to a western audience.

==== Orientalism and the "pizza effect" ====
The interplay between western and eastern notions of religion is an important factor in the development of modern mysticism. In the 19th century, when Asian countries were colonialised by western states, a process of cultural mimesis began. In this process, Western ideas about religion, especially the notion of "religious experience" were introduced to Asian countries by missionaries, scholars and the Theosophical Society, and amalgamated in a new understanding of the Indian and Buddhist traditions. This amalgam was exported back to the West as 'authentic Asian traditions', and acquired a great popularity in the west. Due to this western popularity, it also gained authority back in India, Sri Lanka and Japan.

The best-known representatives of this amalgamated tradition are Annie Besant (Theosophical Society), Swami Vivekenanda and Sarvepalli Radhakrishnan (Neo-Vedanta), Anagarika Dharmapala, a 19th-century Sri Lankan Buddhist activist who founded the Maha Bodhi Society, and D.T. Suzuki, a Japanese scholar and Zen Buddhist. A synonymous term for this broad understanding is nondualism. This mutual influence is also known as the pizza effect.

=== Criticism of the notion of "experience" as insufficient for worldwide viewpoints ===
The notion of "experience", however, has been criticized in religious studies today. Robert Sharf points out that "experience" is a typical Western term, which has found its way into Asian religiosity via western influences. (Note: Roberarf: "[T]he role of experience in the history of Buddhism has been greatly exaggerated in contemporary scholarship. Both historical and ethnographic evidence suggests that the privileging of experience may well be traced to certain twentieth-century reform movements, notably those that urge a return to zazen or vipassana meditation, and these reforms were profoundly influenced by religious developments in the west ii[...] While some adepts may indeed experience "altered states" in the course of their training, critical analysis shows that such states do not constitute the reference point for the elaborate Buddhist discourse pertaining to the "path".) The notion of "experience" introduces a false notion of duality between "experiencer" and "experienced", whereas the essence of kensho is the realisation of the "non-duality" of observer and observed. "Pure experience" does not exist; all experience is mediated by intellectual and cognitive activity. The specific teachings and practices of a specific tradition may even determine what "experience" someone has, which means that this "experience" is not the proof of the teaching, but a result of the teaching. A pure consciousness without concepts, reached by "cleaning the doors of perception", (Note: William Blake: "If the doors of perception were cleansed every thing would appear to man as it is, infinite. For man has closed himself up, till he sees all things thru' narrow chinks of his cavern.") would be an overwhelming chaos of sensory input without coherence.

Constructivists such as Steven Katz reject any typology of experiences since each mystical experience is deemed unique.

Other critics point out that the stress on "experience" is accompanied with favoring the atomic individual, instead of the shared life of the community. It also fails to distinguish between episodic experience, and mysticism as a process, that is embedded in a total religious matrix of liturgy, scripture, worship, virtues, theology, rituals and practices.

Richard King also points to disjunction between "mystical experience" and social justice:

The privatisation of mysticism – that is, the increasing tendency to locate the mystical in the psychological realm of personal experiences – serves to exclude it from political issues as social justice. Mysticism thus becomes seen as a personal matter of cultivating inner states of tranquility and equanimity, which, rather than seeking to transform the world, serve to accommodate the individual to the status quo through the alleviation of anxiety and stress.

The American scholar of religion and philosopher of social science Jason Josephson Storm has also critiqued the definition and category of religious experience, especially when such experiences are used to define religion. He compares the appeal to experience to define religion to failed attempts to defend an essentialist definition of art by appeal to aesthetic experience, and implies that each category lacks a common psychological feature across all such experiences by which they may be defined.

== Characteristics ==
=== William James - mystical and religious experience ===
James emphasized the personal experience of individuals, and describes a broad variety of such experiences in The Varieties of Religious Experience. He considered the "personal religion" to be "more fundamental than either theology or ecclesiasticism", (Note: James: "Churches, when once established, live at secondhand upon tradition; but the founders of every church owed their power originally to the fact of their direct personal communion with the divine. not only the superhuman founders, the Christ, the Buddha, Mahomet, but all the originators of Christian sects have been in this case; – so personal religion should still seem the primordial thing, even to those who continue to esteem it incomplete.") and defines religion as

...the feelings, acts, and experiences of individual men in their solitude, so far as they apprehend themselves to stand in relation to whatever they may consider the divine.

According to James, mystical experiences have four defining qualities:

1. Ineffability. According to James the mystical experience "defies expression, that no adequate report of its content can be given in words".
2. Noetic quality. Mystics stress that their experiences give them "insight into depths of truth unplumbed by the discursive intellect." James referred to this as the "noetic" (or intellectual) "quality" of the mystical.
3. Transiency. James notes that most mystical experiences have a short occurrence, but their effect persists.
4. Passivity. According to James, mystics come to their peak experience not as active seekers, but as passive recipients.

James recognised the broad variety of mystical schools and conflicting doctrines both within and between religions. Nevertheless,

...he shared with thinkers of his era the conviction that beneath the variety could be carved out a certain mystical unanimity, that mystics shared certain common perceptions of the divine, however different their religion or historical epoch,

According to Jesuit scholar William Harmless, "for James there was nothing inherently theological in or about mystical experience", and felt it legitimate to separate the mystic's experience from theological claims. Harmless notes that James "denies the most central fact of religion", namely that religion is practiced by people in groups, and often in public. He also ignores ritual, the historicity of religious traditions, and theology, instead emphasizing "feeling" as central to religion.

=== Rudolf Otto ===
The German philosopher and theologian Rudolf Otto (1869–1937) argues that there is one common factor to all religious experience, independent of the cultural background. In his book The Idea of the Holy (1923) he identifies this factor as the numinous. The "numinous" experience has two aspects:

- mysterium tremendum, which is the tendency to invoke fear and trembling;
- mysterium fascinans, the tendency to attract, fascinate and compel.

The numinous experience also has a personal quality to it, in that the person feels to be in communion with a holy other. Otto sees the numinous as the only possible religious experience. He states: "There is no religion in which it [the numinous] does not live as the real innermost core and without it no religion would be worthy of the name". Otto does not take any other kind of religious experience such as ecstasy and enthusiasm seriously and is of the opinion that they belong to the 'vestibule of religion'.

== Typologies ==
=== Mystical experience ===
==== R. C. Zaehner – theistic, monistic and panenhenic mystical experience ====
R. C. Zaehner (1913–1974) distinguishes between three fundamental types of mysticism, namely theistic, monistic, and panenhenic ("all-in-one") or natural mysticism:

- Theistic mystical experience includes most forms of Jewish, Christian and Islamic mysticism and occasional Hindu examples such as Ramanuja and the Bhagavad Gita.
- Monistic mystical experience, the experience of the unity of one's soul in isolation (Kaivalya) from the material and psychic world, (Note: Compare the work of C.G. Jung.) includes early Buddhism and Hindu schools such as Samkhya, yoga, and Advaita vedanta.
- Panenhenic mystical experience refers to "an experience of Nature in all things or of all things as being one," and includes, for instance, Zen Buddhism, Taoism, much Upanishadic thought, as well as American Transcendentalism.

Within the monistic mystical experience, Zaehner draws a clear distinction between the dualist 'isolationist' ideal of Samkhya, the historical Buddha, and various gnostic sects, and the non-dualist position of Advaita vedanta. According to the former, the union of an individual spiritual monad (soul) and body is "an unnatural state of affairs, and salvation consists in returning to one's own natural 'splendid isolation' in which one contemplates oneself forever in timeless bliss."

Zaehner considers theistic mysticism to be superior to the other two categories, because of its appreciation of God, but also because of its strong moral imperative. Zaehner is directly opposing the views of Aldous Huxley. Natural mystical experiences are in Zaehner's view of less value because they do not lead as directly to the virtues of charity and compassion. Zaehner is generally critical of what he sees as narcissistic tendencies in nature mysticism. (Note: See especially Zaehner, R. C., Mysticism Sacred and Profane, Oxford University Press, Chapters 3,4, and 6.)

Zaehner has been criticised by Paden for the "theological violence" which his approach does to non-theistic traditions, "forcing them into a framework which privileges Zaehner's own liberal Catholicism."

==== Walter T. Stace – extrovertive and introvertive mysticism ====
Zaehner has also been criticised by Walter Terence Stace in his book Mysticism and philosophy (1960) on similar grounds. Stace argues that doctrinal differences between religious traditions are inappropriate criteria when making cross-cultural comparisons of mystical (unitive) experiences. Stace argues that mysticism is part of the process of perception, not interpretation, that is to say that the unity of mystical experiences is perceived, and only afterwards interpreted according to the perceiver's background. This may result in different accounts of the same phenomenon. While an atheist describes the unity as "freed from empirical filling", a religious person might describe it as "God" or "the Divine". In "Mysticism and Philosophy", one of Stace's key questions is whether there are a set of common characteristics to all mystical experiences.

Based on the study of religious texts, which he took as phenomenological descriptions of personal experiences, and excluding occult phenomena, visions, and voices, Stace distinguished two types of mystical experience, namely extrovertive and introvertive mysticism. He describes extrovertive mysticism as an experience of unity within the world, whereas introvertive mysticism is "an experience of unity devoid of perceptual objects; it is literally an experience of 'no-thing-ness'". The unity in extrovertive mysticism is with the totality of objects of perception. While perception stays continuous, "unity shines through the same world"; the unity in introvertive mysticism is with a pure consciousness, devoid of objects of perception, "pure unitary consciousness, wherein awareness of the world and of multiplicity is completely obliterated." According to Stace such experiences are nonsensical and nonintellectual, under a total "suppression of the whole empirical content."

Characteristics of Extrovertive and Introvertive Mystical Experiences as in Stace (1960)
Characteristics of Extrovertive Mystical Experiences	Characteristics of Introvertive Mystical Experiences
1. The Unifying Vision - all things are One	1. The Unitary Consciousness; the One, the Void; pure consciousness
2. The more concrete apprehension of the One as an inner subjectivity, or life, in all things	2. Nonspatial, nontemporal
3. Sense of objectivity or reality	3. Sense of objectivity or reality
4. Blessedness, peace, etc.	4. Blessedness, peace, etc.
5. Feeling of the holy, sacred, or divine	5. Feeling of the holy, sacred, or divine
6. Paradoxicality	6. Paradoxicality
7. Alleged by mystics to be ineffable	7. Alleged by mystics to be ineffable

Stace finally argues that there is a set of seven common characteristics for each type of mystical experience, with many of them overlapping between the two types. Stace furthermore argues that extrovertive mystical experiences are on a lower level than introvertive mystical experiences.

Stace's categories of "introvertive mysticism" and "extrovertive mysticism" are derived from Rudolf Otto's "mysticism of introspection" and "unifying vision".

William Wainwright distinguishes four different kinds of extrovert mystical experience, and two kinds of introvert mystical experience:

- Extrovert: experiencing the unity of nature; experiencing nature as a living presence; experiencing all nature-phenomena as part of an eternal now; the "unconstructed experience" of Buddhism.
- Introvert: pure empty consciousness; the "mutual love" of theistic experiences.

Richard Jones, following William Wainwright, elaborated on the distinction, showing different types of experiences in each category:

1. Extrovertive experiences: the sense of connectedness ("unity") of oneself with nature, with a loss of a sense of boundaries within nature; the luminous glow to nature of "nature mysticism"; the presence of God immanent in nature outside of time shining through nature of "cosmic consciousness"; the lack of separate, self-existing entities of mindfulness states.
2. Introvertive experiences: theistic experiences of connectedness or identity with God in mutual love; nonpersonal differentiated experiences; the depth-mystical experience empty of all differentiable content.

Following Stace's lead, Ralph Hood developed the "Mysticism scale." According to Hood, the introvertive mystical experience may be a common core to mysticism independent of both culture and person, forming the basis of a "perennial psychology". According to Hood, "the perennialist view has strong empirical support," since his scale yielded positive results across various cultures, (Note: Hood: "...it seems fair to conclude that the perennialist view has strong empirical support, insofar as regardless of the language used in the M Scale, the basic structure of the experience remains constant across diverse samples and cultures. This is a way of stating the perennialist thesis in measurable terms.) stating that mystical experience as operationalized from Stace's criteria is identical across various samples. (Note: Hood: "[E]mpirically, there is strong support to claim that as operationalized from Stace's criteria, mystical experience is identical as measured across diverse samples, whether expressed in "neutral language" or with either "God" or "Christ" references.)

Although Stace's work on mysticism received a positive response, it has also been strongly criticised in the 1970s and 1980s, for its lack of methodological rigour and its perennialist pre-assumptions. Major criticisms came from Steven T. Katz in his influential series of publications on mysticism and philosophy, (Note: Mysticism and Philosophical Analysis (Oxford University Press, 1978) * Mysticism and Religious Traditions (Oxford University Press, 1983) * Mysticism and Language (Oxford University Press, 1992) * Mysticism and Sacred Scripture (Oxford University Press, 2000)) and from Wayne Proudfoot in his Religious experience (1985).

Masson and Masson criticised Stace for using a "buried premise," namely that mysticism can provide valid knowledge of the world, equal to science and logic. A similar criticism has been voiced by Jacob van Belzen toward Hood, noting that Hood validated the existence of a common core in mystical experiences, but based on a test which presupposes the existence of such a common core, noting that "the instrument used to verify Stace's conceptualization of Stace is not independent of Stace, but based on him." Belzen also notes that religion does not stand on its own, but is embedded in a cultural context, which should be taken into account. To this criticism Hood et al. answer that universalistic tendencies in religious research "are rooted first in inductive generalizations from cross-cultural consideration of either faith or mysticism," stating that Stace sought out texts which he recognized as an expression of mystical expression, from which he created his universal core. Hood therefore concludes that Belzen "is incorrect when he claims that items were presupposed." (Note: Robert Sharf has criticised the idea that religious texts describe individual religious experience. According to Sharf, their authors go to great lengths to avoid personal experience, which would be seen as invalidating the presumed authority of the historical tradition.)

=== Religious experiences ===
==== Norman Habel - mediated and immediate ====
Biblical scholar Norman Habel defines religious experiences as the structured way in which a believer enters into a relationship with, or gains an awareness of, the sacred within the context of a particular religious tradition. Religious experiences are by their very nature preternatural; that is, out of the ordinary or beyond the natural order of things. They may be difficult to distinguish observationally from psychopathological states such as psychoses or other forms of altered awareness. Not all preternatural experiences are considered to be religious experiences. Following Habel's definition, psychopathological states or drug-induced states of awareness are not considered to be religious experiences because they are mostly not performed within the context of a particular religious tradition.

Moore and Habel identify two classes of religious experiences: the immediate and the mediated religious experience.

- Mediated – In the mediated experience, the believer experiences the sacred through mediators such as rituals, special persons, religious groups, totemic objects or the natural world.
- Immediate – The immediate experience comes to the believer without any intervening agency or mediator. The deity or divine is experienced directly.

==== Richard Swinburne - public or private ====
In his book Faith and Reason, the philosopher Richard Swinburne formulated five categories into which all religious experiences fall:

- Public – a believer 'sees God's hand at work', whereas other explanations are possible e.g. looking at a beautiful sunset
- Public – an unusual event that breaches natural law e.g. walking on water
- Private – describable using normal language e.g. Jacob's vision of a ladder
- Private – indescribable using normal language, usually a mystical experience e.g. "white did not cease to be white, nor black cease to be black, but black became white and white became black."
- Private – a non-specific, general feeling of God working in one's life.

Swinburne also suggested two principles for the assessment of religious experiences:

- Principle of Credulity – with the absence of any reason to disbelieve it, one should accept what appears to be true e.g. if one sees someone walking on water, one should believe that it is occurring.
- Principle of Testimony – with the absence of any reason to disbelieve them, one should accept that eyewitnesses or believers are telling the truth when they testify about religious experiences.

== Interpretation: perennialism, constructionism and contextualism ==
=== Perennialism ===
Scholarly research on mystical experiences in the 19th and 20th century was dominated by a discourse on "mystical experience," laying sole emphasis on the experiential aspect, be it spontaneous or induced by human behavior. Perennialists regard those various experiences traditions as pointing to one universal transcendental reality, for which those experiences offer the prove. In this approach, mystical experiences are privatised, separated from the context in which they emerge. William James, in his The Varieties of Religious Experience, was highly influential in further popularising this perennial approach and the notion of personal experience as a validation of religious truths.

The essentialist model argues that mystical experience is independent of the sociocultural, historical and religious context in which it occurs, and regards all mystical experience in its essence to be the same. According to this "common core-thesis", different descriptions can mask quite similar if not identical experiences:

[P]eople can differentiate experience from interpretation, such that different interpretations may be applied to otherwise identical experiences".

Principal exponents of the perennialist position were William James, Walter Terence Stace, who distinguishes extroverted and introverted mysticism, in response to R. C. Zaehner's distinction between theistic and monistic mysticism; Huston Smith; and Ralph W. Hood, who conducted empirical research using the "Mysticism Scale", which is based on Stace's model. (Note: Others include Frithjof Schuon, Rudolf Otto and Aldous Huxley.)

The perennial position is "largely dismissed by scholars", but "has lost none of its popularity". The contextual approach has become the common approach, and takes into account the historical and cultural context of mystical experiences.

=== Steven Katz – constructionism ===
After Walter Stace's seminal book in 1960, the general philosophy of mysticism received little attention. (Note: Two notable exceptions are collections of essays by Wainwright 1981 and Jones 1983.) But in the 1970s the issue of a universal "perennialism" versus each mystical experience being was reignited by Steven Katz. In an often-cited quote he states:

There are NO pure (i.e. unmediated) experiences. Neither mystical experience nor more ordinary forms of experience give any indication, or any ground for believing, that they are unmediated [...] The notion of unmediated experience seems, if not self-contradictory, at best empty. This epistemological fact seems to me to be true, because of the sort of beings we are, even with regard to the experiences of those ultimate objects of concern with which mystics have had intercourse, e.g., God, Being, Nirvana, etc. (Note: Original in Katz (1978), Mysticism and Philosophical Analysis, Oxford University Press)

Social constructionism argues that mystical experiences are "a family of similar experiences that includes many different kinds, as represented by the many kinds of religious and secular mystical reports". The constructionist states that mystical experiences are fully constructed by the ideas, symbols and practices that mystics are familiar with, shaped by the concepts "which the mystic brings to, and which shape, his experience". What is being experienced is being determined by the expectations and the conceptual background of the mystic. Critics of the "common-core thesis" argue that

[N]o unmediated experience is possible, and that in the extreme, language is not simply used to interpret experience but in fact constitutes experience.

The principal exponent of the constructionist position is Steven T. Katz, who, in a series of publications, (Note: Mysticism and Philosophical Analysis (Oxford University Press, 1978); Mysticism and Religious Traditions (Oxford University Press, 1983); Mysticism and Language (Oxford University Press, 1992); Mysticism and Sacred Scripture (Oxford University Press, 2000)) has made a highly influential and compelling case for the constructionist approach.

According to Katz (1978), Stace's typology is "too reductive and inflexible," reducing the complexities and varieties of mystical experience into "improper categories." According to Katz, Stace does not notice the difference between experience and interpretation, but fails to notice the epistemological issues involved in recognizing such experiences as "mystical," and the even more fundamental issue of which conceptual framework precedes and shapes these experiences. Katz further notes that Stace supposes that similarities in descriptive language also implies a similarity in experience, an assumption which Katz rejects. According to Katz, close examination of the descriptions and their contexts reveals that those experiences are not identical. Katz further notes that Stace held one specific mystical tradition to be superior and normative, whereas Katz rejects reductionist notions and leaves God as God, and Nirvana as Nirvana.

According to Paden, Katz rejects the discrimination between experiences and their interpretations. Katz argues that it is not the description, but the experience itself which is conditioned by the cultural and religious background of the mystic. According to Katz, it is not possible to have pure or unmediated experience.

Yet, according to Laibelman, Katz did not say that the experience cannot be unmediated; he said that the conceptual understanding of the experience cannot be unmediated, and is based on culturally mediated preconceptions. According to Laibelman, misunderstanding Katz's argument has led some to defend the authenticity of "pure consciousness events," while this is not the issue. Laibelman further notes that a mystic's interpretation is not necessarily more true or correct than the interpretation of an uninvolved observer.

=== Robert Forman – pure consciousness event ===
Robert Forman has criticised Katz' approach, arguing that lay-people who describe mystical experiences often notice that this experience involves a totally new form of awareness, which cannot be described in their existing frame of reference. Newberg argued that there is neurological evidence for the existence of a "pure consciousness event" empty of any constructionist structuring.

=== Richard Jones – constructivism, anticonstructivism, and perennialism ===
Richard H. Jones believes that the dispute between "constructionism" and "perennialism" is ill-formed. He draws a distinction between "anticonstructivism" and "perennialism": constructivism can be rejected with respect to a certain class of mystical experiences without ascribing to a perennialist philosophy on the relation of mystical doctrines. Constructivism versus anticonstructivism is a matter of the nature of mystical experiences themselves while perennialism is a matter of mystical traditions and the doctrines they espouse. One can reject constructivism about the nature of mystical experiences without claiming that all mystical experiences reveal a cross-cultural "perennial truth". Anticonstructivists can advocate contextualism as much as constructivists do, while perennialists reject the need to study mystical experiences in the context of a mystic's culture since all mystics state the same universal truth.

=== Contextualism and attribution theory ===
The theoretical study of mystical experience has shifted from an experiential, privatised and perennialist approach to a contextual and empirical approach. The contextual approach, which also includes constructionism and attribution theory, takes into account the historical and cultural context. Neurological research takes an empirical approach, relating mystical experiences to neurological processes.

Wayne Proudfoot proposes an approach that also negates any alleged cognitive content of mystical experiences: mystics unconsciously merely attribute a doctrinal content to ordinary experiences. That is, mystics project cognitive content onto otherwise ordinary experiences having a strong emotional impact. Objections have been raised concerning Proudfoot's use of the psychological data. This approach, however, has been further elaborated by Ann Taves. She incorporates both neurological and cultural approaches in the study of mystical experience.

Many religious and mystical traditions see religious experiences (particularly that knowledge that comes with them) as revelations caused by divine agency rather than ordinary natural processes. They are considered real encounters with God or gods, or real contact with higher-order realities of which humans are not ordinarily aware. (Note: The Argument from Religious Experience)

== Inducement and development ==
Mystical traditions offer the means to induce mystical experiences, which may have several origins:

- Spontaneous; either apparently without any cause, or by persistent existential concerns;
- Neurophysiological origins. These are studied in the field of neurotheology, and the cognitive science of religion, and include near-death experiences. Causes may be: temporal lobe epilepsy, as described in the Geschwind syndrome, stroke, profound depression, or schizophrenia;
- Religious practices, such as contemplation, meditation, (Note: Meditative practices are used to calm the mind, and attain states of consciousness such as nirvikalpa samadhi. Meditation can be focused on the breath, concepts, mantras, symbols.) questioning or investigating (self)representations/cognitive schemata, such as Self-enquiry, Hua Tou practice, and Douglas Harding's on having no head; mantra-repetition, prayer, music dance, such as Sufi whirling, and lucid dreaming;
- Entheogens (drugs). (Note: such as: Ayahuasca (DMT); Salvia divinorum (salvinorin A); Peyote (mescaline); Psilocybin mushrooms (psilocybin); Amanita muscaria (muscimol); Cannabis; LSD; MDMA; Soma; Ketamine)

Most mystical traditions warn against an attachment to mystical experiences, and offer a "protective and hermeneutic framework" to accommodate these experiences.

== Empirical studies ==
The empirical study of mysticism today focuses on two topics: identifying the neurological correlates of mystical experiences, and demonstrating the purported benefits of meditation. Correlates between mystical experiences and neurological activity have been established, pointing to the temporal lobe as the main locus for these experiences, while Andrew B. Newberg and Eugene G. d'Aquili have also pointed to the parietal lobe. Recent research points to the relevance of the default mode network and the anterior insula, which may be related to the experience of ineffability, the subjective sense of certainty induced by mystical experiences.

=== Neuroscience ===
Lobes of the human brain
Lobes of the human brain (temporal lobe is shown in green)

Early studies in the 1950s and 1960s attempted to use EEGs to study brain wave patterns correlated with spiritual states. During the 1980s Dr. Michael Persinger stimulated the temporal lobes of human subjects with a weak magnetic field. His subjects claimed to have a sensation of "an ethereal presence in the room." Some current studies use neuroimaging to localize brain regions active, or differentially active, during religious experiences. These neuroimaging studies have implicated a number of brain regions, including the limbic system, dorsolateral prefrontal cortex, superior parietal lobe, and caudate nucleus. Based on the complex nature of religious experience, it is likely that they are mediated by an interaction of neural mechanisms that all add a small piece to the overall experience.

Neuroscience of religion, also known as neurotheology, biotheology or spiritual neuroscience, is the study of correlations of neural phenomena with subjective experiences of spirituality and hypotheses to explain these phenomena. Proponents of neurotheology claim that there is a neurological and evolutionary basis for subjective experiences traditionally categorized as spiritual or religious.

The neuroscience of religion takes neural correlates as the basis of cognitive functions and religious experiences. These religious experiences are thereby emergent properties of neural correlates. This approach does not necessitate exclusion of the Self, but interprets the Self as influenced or otherwise acted upon by underlying neural mechanisms. Proponents argue that religious experience can be evoked through stimulus of specific brain regions and/or can be observed through measuring increase in activity of specific brain regions. (Note: This is contrary to the view of William James and F.D.E. Schleiermacher who viewed religious experience as a "preconceptual, immediate affective event.")

According to the neurotheologist Andrew B. Newberg and two colleagues, neurological processes which are driven by the repetitive, rhythmic stimulation which is typical of human ritual, and which contribute to the delivery of transcendental feelings of connection to a universal unity. They posit, however, that physical stimulation alone is not sufficient to generate transcendental unitive experiences. For this to occur they say there must be a blending of the rhythmic stimulation with ideas. Once this occurs "...ritual turns a meaningful idea into a visceral experience." Moreover, they say that humans are compelled to act out myths by the biological operations of the brain due to what they call the "inbuilt tendency of the brain to turn thoughts into actions."

An alternate approach is influenced by personalism, and exists contra-parallel to the reductionist approach. It focuses on the Self as the object of interest, (Note: According to the Stanford Encyclopedia of Philosophy, "[personalism] emphasizes the significance, uniqueness and inviolability of the person, as well as the person's essentially relational or communitarian dimension.") the same object of interest as in religion. According to Patrick McNamara, a proponent of personalism, the Self is a neural entity that controls rather than consists of the cognitive functions being processed in brain regions.

A biological basis for religious experience may exist. References to the supernatural or mythical beings first appeared approximately 40,000 years ago. A popular theory posits that dopaminergic brain systems are the evolutionary basis for human intellect and more specifically abstract reasoning. The capacity for religious thought arises from the capability to employ abstract reasoning. There is no evidence to support the theory that abstract reasoning, generally or with regard to religious thought, evolved independent of the dopaminergic axis. Religious behavior has been linked to "extrapersonal brain systems that predominate the ventromedial cortex and rely heavily on dopaminergic transmission." A biphasic effect exists with regard to activation of the dopaminergic axis and/or ventromedial cortex. While mild activation can evoke a perceived understanding of the supernatural, extreme activation can lead to delusions characteristic of psychosis. Stress can cause the depletion of 5-hydroxytryptamine, also referred to as serotonin. The ventromedial 5-HT axis is involved in peripersonal activities such as emotional arousal, social skills, and visual feedback. When 5-HT is decreased or depleted, one may become subject to "incorrect attributions of self-initiated or internally generated activity (e.g. hallucinations)."

==== Temporal lobe ====
Temporal lobe epilepsy has become a popular field of study due to its correlation to religious experience. Religious experiences and hyperreligiosity are often used to characterize those with temporal lobe epilepsy. Visionary religious experiences, and momentary lapses of consciousness, may point toward a diagnosis of Geschwind syndrome. More generally, the symptoms are consistent with features of temporal lobe epilepsy, not an uncommon feature in religious icons and mystics. It seems that this phenomenon is not exclusive to TLE, but can manifest in the presence of other epileptic variates as well as mania, obsessive-compulsive disorder, and schizophrenia, conditions characterized by ventromedial dopaminergic dysfunction.

The temporal lobe generates the feeling of "I", and gives a feeling of familiarity or strangeness to the perceptions of the senses. It seems to be involved in mystical experiences, and in the change in personality that may result from such experiences. There is a long-standing notion that epilepsy and religion are linked, and some religious figures may have had temporal lobe epilepsy (TLE). Raymond Bucke's book Cosmic Consciousness (1901) contains several case-studies of persons who have realized "cosmic consciousness"; several of these cases are also being mentioned in J.E. Bryant's 1953 book, Genius and Epilepsy, which has a list of more than 20 people that combines the great and the mystical. James Leuba's The psychology of religious mysticism noted that "among the dread diseases that afflict humanity there is only one that interests us quite particularly; that disease is epilepsy."

Slater and Beard renewed the interest in TLE and religious experience in the 1960s. Dewhurst and Beard (1970) described six cases of TLE-patients who underwent sudden religious conversions. They placed these cases in the context of several western saints with a sudden conversion, who were or may have been epileptic. Dewhurst and Beard described several aspects of conversion experiences, and did not favor one specific mechanism.

Norman Geschwind described behavioral changes related to temporal lobe epilepsy in the 1970s and 1980s. Geschwind described cases which included extreme religiosity, now called Geschwind syndrome, and aspects of the syndrome have been identified in some religious figures, in particular extreme religiosity and hypergraphia (excessive writing). Geschwind introduced this "interictal personality disorder" to neurology, describing a cluster of specific personality characteristics which he found characteristic of patients with temporal lobe epilepsy. Critics note that these characteristics can be the result of any illness, and are not sufficiently descriptive for patients with temporal lobe epilepsy.

Neuropsychiatrist Peter Fenwick, in the 1980s and 1990s, also found a relationship between the right temporal lobe and mystical experience, but also found that pathology or brain damage is only one of many possible causal mechanisms for these experiences. He questioned the earlier accounts of religious figures with temporal lobe epilepsy, noticing that "very few true examples of the ecstatic aura and the temporal lobe seizure had been reported in the world scientific literature prior to 1980". According to Fenwick, "It is likely that the earlier accounts of temporal lobe epilepsy and temporal lobe pathology and the relation to mystic and religious states owes more to the enthusiasm of their authors than to a true scientific understanding of the nature of temporal lobe functioning."

The occurrence of intense religious feelings in epileptic patients in general is rare, with an incident rate of about 2–3%. Sudden religious conversion, together with visions, has been documented in only a small number of individuals with temporal lobe epilepsy. The occurrence of religious experiences in TLE-patients may as well be explained by religious attribution, due to the background of these patients. Nevertheless, the Neuroscience of religion is a growing field of research, searching for specific neurological explanations of mystical experiences. Those rare epileptic patients with ecstatic seizures may provide clues for the neurological mechanisms involved in mystical experiences, such as the anterior insular cortex, which is involved in self-awareness and subjective certainty.

==== Anterior insula ====
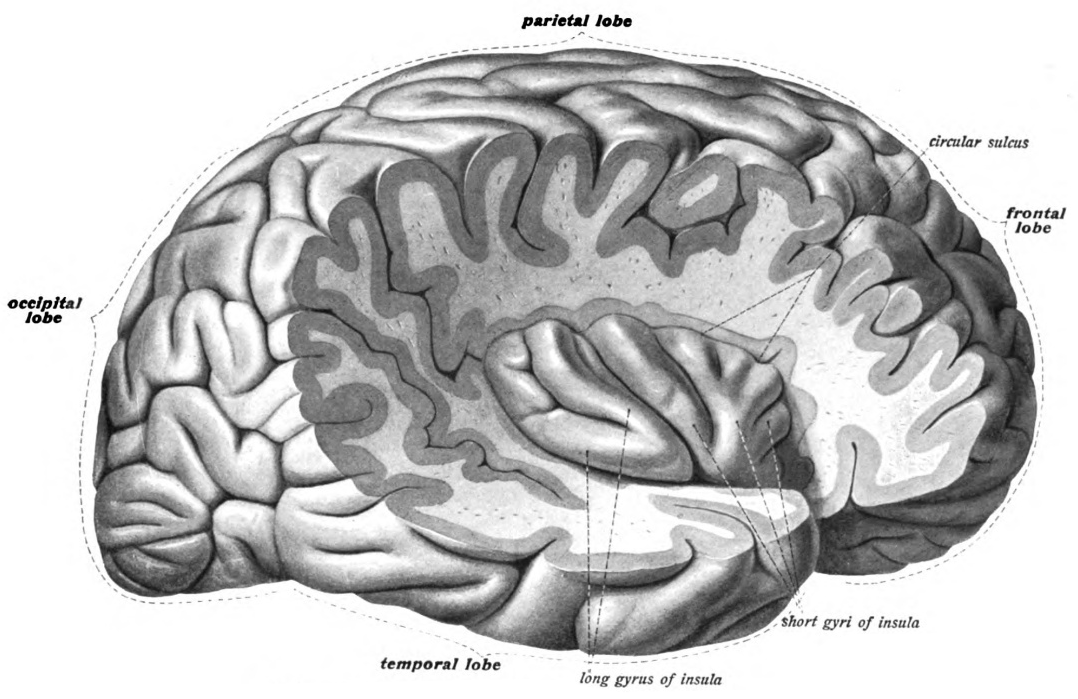
The insula of the right side, exposed by removing the opercula

A common quality in mystical experiences is ineffability, a strong feeling of certainty which cannot be expressed in words. This ineffability has been threatened with scepticism. According to Arthur Schopenhauer the inner experience of mysticism is philosophically unconvincing. (Note: Schopenhauer: "In the widest sense, mysticism is every guidance to the immediate awareness of what is not reached by either perception or conception, or generally by any knowledge. The mystic is opposed to the philosopher by the fact that he begins from within, whereas the philosopher begins from without. The mystic starts from his inner, positive, individual experience, in which he finds himself as the eternal and only being, and so on. But nothing of this is communicable except the assertions that we have to accept on his word; consequently he is unable to convince.) In The Emotion Machine, Marvin Minsky argues that mystical experiences only seem profound and persuasive because the mind's critical faculties are relatively inactive during them. (Note: Meditator: It suddenly seemed as if I was surrounded by an immensely powerful Presence. I felt that a Truth had been "revealed" to me that was far more important than anything else, and for which I needed no further evidence. But when later I tried to describe this to my friends, I found that I had nothing to say except how wonderful that experience was. This peculiar type of mental state is sometimes called a "Mystical Experience" or "Rapture," "Ecstasy," or "Bliss." Some who undergo it call it "wonderful," but a better word might be "wonderless," because I suspect that such a state of mind may result from turning so many Critics off that one cannot find any flaws in it. What might that "powerful Presence" represent? It is sometimes seen as a deity, but I suspect that it is likely to be a version of some early Imprimer that for years has been hiding inside your mind. (Note: Minsky's idea of 'some early Imprimer hiding in the mind' was an echo of Freud's belief that mystical experience was essentially infantile and regressive, i.e., a memory of 'Oneness' with the mother.) In any case, such experiences can be dangerous—for some victims find them so compelling that they devote the rest of their lives to trying to get themselves back to that state again.)

Geschwind and Picard propose a neurological explanation for this subjective certainty, based on clinical research of epilepsy. (Note: See also Francesca Sacco (2013-09-19), Can Epilepsy Unlock The Secret To Happiness?, Le Temps) According to Picard, this feeling of certainty may be caused by a dysfunction of the anterior insula, a part of the brain which is involved in interoception, self-reflection, and in avoiding uncertainty about the internal representations of the world by "anticipation of resolution of uncertainty or risk". This avoidance of uncertainty functions through the comparison between predicted states and actual states, that is, "signaling that we do not understand, i.e., that there is ambiguity." Picard notes that "the concept of insight is very close to that of certainty," and refers to Archimedes "Eureka!" (Note: See also satori in Japanese Zen) Picard hypothesizes that in ecstatic seizures the comparison between predicted states and actual states no longer functions, and that mismatches between predicted state and actual state are no longer processed, "block[ing] negative emotions and negative arousal arising from predictive uncertainty," which will be experienced as emotional confidence. Picard concludes that "[t]his could lead to a spiritual interpretation in some individuals."

==== Parietal lobe ====
Andrew B. Newberg and Eugene G. d'Aquili, in their book Why God Won't Go Away: Brain Science and the Biology of Belief, take a perennial stance, describing their insights into the relationship between religious experience and brain function. d'Aquili describes his own meditative experiences as "allowing a deeper, simpler part of him to emerge", which he believes to be "the truest part of who he is, the part that never changes." Not content with personal and subjective descriptions like these, Newberg and d'Aquili have studied the brain-correlates to such experiences. They scanned the brain blood flow patterns during such moments of mystical transcendence, using SPECT-scans, to detect which brain areas show heightened activity. Their scans showed unusual activity in the top rear section of the brain, the "posterior superior parietal lobe", or the "orientation association area (OAA)" in their own words. This area creates a consistent cognition of the physical limits of the self. This OAA shows a sharply reduced activity during meditative states, reflecting a block in the incoming flow of sensory information, resulting in a perceived lack of physical boundaries. According to Newberg and d'Aquili,

This is exactly how Robert and generations of Eastern mystics before him have described their peak meditative, spiritual and mystical moments.

Newberg and d'Aquili conclude that mystical experience correlates to observable neurological events, which are not outside the range of normal brain function. They also believe that

...our research has left us no choice but to conclude that the mystics may be on to something, that the mind's machinery of transcendence may in fact be a window through which we can glimpse the ultimate realness of something that is truly divine. (Note: See Radhakrishnan for a similar stance on the value of religious experience. Radhakrishnan saw Hinduism as a scientific religion based on facts, apprehended via intuition or religious experience. (Note: Michael Hawley, Sarvepalli Radhakrishnan (1888—1975), Internet Encyclopedia of Philosophy) According to Radhakrishnan, "[i]f philosophy of religion is to become scientific, it must become empirical and found itself on religious experience". He saw this empiricism exemplified in the Vedas: "The truths of the ṛṣis are not evolved as the result of logical reasoning or systematic philosophy but are the products of spiritual intuition, dṛṣti or vision. The ṛṣis are not so much the authors of the truths recorded in the Vedas as the seers who were able to discern the eternal truths by raising their life-spirit to the plane of universal spirit. They are the pioneer researchers in the realm of the spirit who saw more in the world than their followers. Their utterances are not based on transitory vision but on a continuous experience of resident life and power. When the Vedas are regarded as the highest authority, all that is meant is that the most exacting of all authorities is the authority of facts." This stance is echoed by Ken Wilber: "The point is that we might have an excellent population of extremely evolved and developed personalities in the form of the world's great mystic-sages (a point which is supported by Maslow's studies). Let us, then, simply assume that the authentic mystic-sage represents the very highest stages of human development—as far beyond normal and average humanity as humanity itself is beyond apes. This, in effect, would give us a sample which approximates "the highest state of consciousness"—a type of "superconscious state." Furthermore, most of the mystic-sages have left rather detailed records of the stages and steps of their own transformations into the superconscious realms. That is, they tell us not only of the highest level of consciousness and superconsciousness, but also of all the intermediate levels leading up to it. If we take all these higher stages and add them to the lower and middle stages/levels which have been so carefully described and studied by Western psychology, we would then arrive at a fairly well-balanced and comprehensive model of the spectrum of consciousness.")

Why God Won't Go Away "received very little attention from professional scholars of religion". (Note: See Michael Shermer (2001), Is God All in the Mind? for a review in Science.) (Note: According to Matthew Day, the book "is fatally compromised by conceptual confusions, obsolete scholarship, clumsy sleights of hand and untethered speculation". According to Matthew Day, Newberg and d'Aquili "consistently discount the messy reality of empirical religious heterogenity".) According to Bulkeley, "Newberg and D'Aquili seem blissfully unaware of the past half century of critical scholarship questioning universalistic claims about human nature and experience". (Note: Bulkely (2003). "The Gospel According to Darwin: the relevance of cognitive neuroscience to religious studies". Religious Studies Review. 29 (2): 123–129.. Cited in) Matthew Day also writes that the discovery of a neurological substrate of a "religious experience" is an isolated finding which "doesn't even come close to a robust theory of religion".

==== Default mode network ====
Recent studies evidenced the relevance of the default mode network in spiritual and self-transcending experiences. Its functions are related, among others, to self-reference and self-awareness, and new imaging experiments during meditation and the use of hallucinogens indicate a decrease in the activity of this network mediated by them, leading some studies to base on it a probable neurocognitive mechanism of the dissolution of the self, which occurs in some mystical phenomena.

=== Psychiatry ===
A 2011 paper suggested that psychiatric conditions associated with psychotic spectrum symptoms may be possible explanations for revelatory-driven experiences and activities such as those of Abraham, Moses, Jesus and Saint Paul. It also proposed that the behavior of the followers of these religious figures could be explained through the lens of psychopathology and group dynamics.

=== Psychedelic drugs ===
A number of studies by Roland R. Griffiths and other researchers have concluded that high doses of psilocybin and other classic psychedelics trigger mystical experiences in most research participants. Mystical experiences have been measured by a number of psychometric scales, including the Hood Mysticism Scale, the Spiritual Transcendence Scale, and the Mystical Experience Questionnaire. The revised version of the Mystical Experience Questionnaire, for example, asks participants about four dimensions of their experience, namely the "mystical" quality, positive mood such as the experience of amazement, the loss of the usual sense of time and space, and the sense that the experience cannot be adequately conveyed through words. The questions on the "mystical" quality in turn probe multiple aspects: the sense of "pure" being, the sense of unity with one's surroundings, the sense that what one experienced was real, and the sense of sacredness. Some researchers have questioned the interpretation of the results from these studies and whether the framework and terminology of mysticism are appropriate in a scientific context, while other researchers have responded to those criticisms and argued that descriptions of mystical experiences are compatible with a scientific worldview.

== Integrating religious experience ==
=== Religious traditions ===
In mystical and contemplative traditions, mystical experiences are not a goal in themselves, but part of a larger path of self-transformation. For example, the Zen Buddhist training does not end with kenshō, but practice is to be continued to deepen the insight and to express it in daily life. (Note: See, for example: * Contemporary Chan Master Sheng Yen: "Ch'an expressions refer to enlightenment as "seeing your self-nature". But even this is not enough. After seeing your self-nature, you need to deepen your experience even further and bring it into maturation. You should have enlightenment experience again and again and support them with continuous practice. Even though Ch'an says that at the time of enlightenment, your outlook is the same as of the Buddha, you are not yet a full Buddha." * Contemporary western Rev. Master Jiyu-Kennett: "One can easily get the impression that realization, kenshō, an experience of enlightenment, or however you wish to phrase it, is the end of Zen training. It is not. It is, rather, a new beginning, an entrance into a more mature phase of Buddhist training. To take it as an ending, and to "dine out" on such an experience without doing the training that will deepen and extend it, is one of the greatest tragedies of which I know. There must be continuous development, otherwise you will be as a wooden statue sitting upon a plinth to be dusted, and the life of Buddha will not increase.") To deepen the initial insight of kensho, shikantaza and kōan-study are necessary. This trajectory of initial insight followed by a gradual deepening and ripening is expressed by Linji Yixuan in his Three Mysterious Gates, the Five Ranks, the Four Ways of Knowing of Hakuin, and the Ten Ox-Herding Pictures which detail the steps on the Path.

=== Psychology ===
Several psychologists have proposed models in which religious experiences are part of a process of transformation of the self.

Carl Jung's work on himself and his patients convinced him that life has a spiritual purpose beyond material goals. One's main task, he believed, is to discover and fulfil deep innate potential, much as the acorn contains the potential to become the oak, or the caterpillar to become the butterfly. Based on his study of Christianity, Hinduism, Buddhism, Gnosticism, Taoism, and other traditions, Jung perceived that this journey of transformation is at the mystical heart of all religions. It is a journey to meet the self and at the same time to meet the Divine. Unlike Sigmund Freud, Jung thought spiritual experience was essential to well-being.

The notion of the numinous was an important concept in the writings of Carl Jung. Jung regarded numinous experiences as fundamental to an understanding of the individuation process because of their association with experiences of synchronicity in which the presence of archetypes is felt.

McNamara proposes that religious experiences may help in "decentering" the self, and transform it into an integral self which is closer to an ideal self.

Transpersonal psychology is a school of psychology that studies the transpersonal, self-transcendent or spiritual aspects of the human experience. The Journal of Transpersonal Psychology describes transpersonal psychology as "the study of humanity’s highest potential, and with the recognition, understanding, and realization of unitive, spiritual, and transcendent states of consciousness". Issues considered in transpersonal psychology include spiritual self-development, peak experiences, mystical experiences, systemic trance and other metaphysical experiences of living.

== See also ==
- Altered state of consciousness
- Argument from religious experience
- Beatific vision
- Dhyāna in Buddhism
- Dhyana in Hinduism
- Divine illumination
- Divine madness
- Ego death
- Enlightenment in Buddhism
- Epiphany (feeling)
- Higher consciousness
- Kundalini
- List of New Age topics
- Nirvana
- Private revelation
- Psychology of religion
- Psychonautics
- Religious ecstasy
- Religious Experience Research Centre
- Satori
- Sahaja
- Self-knowledge
- Spiritual crisis
- Spirit world (Spiritualism)
- Subitism
- Supernatural
- Transcendence (religion)
- Turiya
- Unverified personal gnosis
- Western esotericism

== Sources ==
=== Printed sources ===
- Adamson, Sophia; Metzner, Ralph (1988). "The Nature of the MDMA Experience and Its Role in Healing, Psychotherapy, and Spiritual Practice". maps.org. MAPS. Archived from the original on 2026-04-08.
- Andrews, Barry (12 March 1999). "The Roots Of Unitarian Universalist Spirituality In New England Transcendentalism". Archive.uua.org. Archived from the original on 2013-09-21.
- Azari, N.P.; Missimer, J.; Seitz, R.J. (2005). "Religious experience and emotion: Evidence for distinctive cognitive neural patterns". International Journal for the Psychology of Religion. 15 (4): 263–281. doi:10.1207/s15327582ijpr1504_1. S2CID 144131222.
- Azari, N. P.; Nickel, J.; Wunderlich, G.; Niedeggen, M.; Hefter, H.; Tellmann, L.; Herzog, H.; Stoerig, P.; Birnbacher, D. (April 2001). "Neural correlates of religious experience". The European Journal of Neuroscience. 13 (8): 1649–1652. doi:10.1046/j.0953-816x.2001.01527.x. ISSN 0953-816X. PMID 11328359. S2CID 22241837.
- Azari, Nina P.; Slors, Marc (2007). "From Brain Imaging Religious Experience to Explaining Religion: A Critique". Archive for the Psychology of Religion. 29: 67–85. doi:10.1163/008467207X188630. hdl:2066/39569. S2CID 2349432.
- Baggott, Matthew J. (1996). "A Note on the Safety of Peyote when Used Religiously". Council on Spiritual Practices. Archived from the original on 2017-12-25.
- Barrett, Frederick S.; Johnson, Matthew W.; Griffiths, Roland R. (2015). "Validation of the revised Mystical Experience Questionnaire in experimental sessions with psilocybin". Journal of Psychopharmacology. 29 (11): 1182–1190. doi:10.1177/0269881115609019. PMC 5203697. PMID 26442957.
- Barbour, Ian (1966). Issues in Science and Religion. Prentice-Hall. ISBN 0-334-00737-2. OCLC 17518056.
- Barnard, William G. (1992), Explaining the Unexplainable: Wayne Proudfoot's Religious Experience, Journal of the American Academy of Religion 60 (no. 2): 231-57
- Barrett, Frederick S.; Griffiths, Roland R. (2018). Classic Hallucinogens and Mystical Experiences: Phenomenology and Neural Correlates. Current Topics in Behavioral Neurosciences. Vol. 36. pp. 393–430. doi:10.1007/7854_2017_474. ISBN 978-3-662-55878-2. ISSN 1866-3370. PMC 6707356. PMID 28401522.
- Barsuglia, Joseph; Davis, Alan K.; Palmer, Robert; Lancelotta, Rafael; Windham-Herman, Austin-Marley; Peterson, Kristel; Polanco, Martin; Grant, Robert; Griffiths, Roland R. (2018). "Intensity of Mystical Experiences Occasioned by 5-MeO-DMT and Comparison With a Prior Psilocybin Study". Frontiers in Psychology. 9 2459. doi:10.3389/fpsyg.2018.02459. PMC 6292276. PMID 30574112.
- Beauregard, M.; Paquette, V. (2006). "Neural correlates of a mystical experience in Carmelite nuns". Neuroscience Letters. 405 (3): 186–190. doi:10.1016/j.neulet.2006.06.060. PMID 16872743. S2CID 13563460.
- Beauregard, Mario and Denyse O'Leary (2007), The Spiritual Brain, Seven Bridges Press
- Belzen, Jacob van (2010), Towards Cultural Psychology of Religion: Principles, Approaches, Applications, Springer Science & Business Media
- Bentall, R. P. (January 1990). "The illusion of reality: a review and integration of psychological research on hallucinations". Psychological Bulletin. 107 (1): 82–95. doi:10.1037/0033-2909.107.1.82. ISSN 0033-2909. PMID 2404293.
- Biello, David (3 October 2007). "Searching for God in the Brain". Scientific American. Archived from the original on 2007-10-11.
- Bryant, Ernest J. (1953), Genius and Epilepsy. Brief sketches of Great Men Who Had Both, Concord, Massachusetts: Ye Old Depot Press
- Breeksema, Joost J.; van Elk, Michiel (2021). "Working with Weirdness: A Response to "Moving Past Mysticism in Psychedelic Science"". ACS Pharmacology & Translational Science. 4 (4): 1471–1474. doi:10.1021/acsptsci.1c00149. PMC 8369678. PMID 34423279.
- Byron, Katie (2003), Loving What Is, Three Rivers Press, ISBN 1-4000-4537-1
- Carrithers, Michael (1983), The Forest Monks of Sri Lanka
- Charlesworth, Max (1988), Religious experience. Unit A. Study guide 2 (Deakin University)
- Crowley, Vivianne (2000). Jung: A Journey of Transformation: Exploring His Life and Experiencing His Ideas. Wheaton Illinois: Quest Books. ISBN 978-0-8356-0782-7.
- Danielou, Alain (1951). Yoga the Method of Reintegration. Lightning Source Incorporated. ISBN 0766133141.
- Danto, Arthur C. (1987), Mysticism and Morality, New York: Columbia University Press
- Day, Matthew (2009), Exotic experience and ordinary life. In: Micael Stausberg (ed.) (2009), "Contemporary Theories of Religion", pp. 115–129, Routledge, ISBN 9780203875926
- Devinsky, O. (2003), "Religious experiences and epilepsy", Epilepsy & Behavior, 4 (1): 76–77, doi:10.1016/s1525-5050(02)00680-7, PMID 12609231, S2CID 32445013
- Devinsky, J.; Schachter, S. (2009). "Norman Geschwind's contribution to the understanding of behavioral changes in temporal lobe epilepsy: The February 1974 lecture". Epilepsy & Behavior. 15 (4): 417–24. doi:10.1016/j.yebeh.2009.06.006. PMID 19640791. S2CID 22179745.
- Dewhurst, K.; Beard, A. (2003) [1970]. "Sudden religious conversions in temporal lobe epilepsy" (PDF). Epilepsy & Behavior. 4 (1): 78–87. doi:10.1016/S1525-5050(02)00688-1. PMID 12609232. S2CID 28084208. Archived from the original (PDF) on 2007-09-30.
- D'Onofrio, B.M.; Eaves, L.J.; Murrelle, L.; Maes, H.H.; Spilka, B. (1999). "Understanding biological and social influences on religious affiliation, attitudes, and behaviors: A behavior genetic perspective". Journal of Personality. 67 (6): 953–984. doi:10.1111/1467-6494.00079. PMID 10637988.
- Drvinsky, Julie; Schachter, Steven (2009), "Norman Geschwind's contribution to the understanding of behavioral changes in temporal lobe epilepsy: The February 1974 lecture", Epilepsy & Behavior, 15 (4): 417–424, doi:10.1016/j.yebeh.2009.06.006, PMID 19640791, S2CID 22179745
- Ellison, C. G.; Levin, J. S. (1998). "The Religion-Health Connection: Evidence, Theory, and Future Directions". Health Education & Behavior. 25 (6): 700–720. doi:10.1177/109019819802500603. PMID 9813743. S2CID 6835008.
- Forman, Robert K., ed. (1997), The Problem of Pure Consciousness: Mysticism and Philosophy, Oxford University Press, ISBN 9780195355116
- Forman, Robert K. (1999), Mysticism, Albany: State University of New York Press
- Freud, Sigmund (1930), Civilization and Its Discontents
- Gajilan, A. Chris (4 April 2007). "Are humans hard-wired for faith?". Cable News Network. Archived from the original on 2026-04-13.
- Gellman, Jerome (Summer 2011), "Mysticism", in Zalta, Edward N. (ed.), The Stanford Encyclopedia of Philosophy, Stanford University, archived from the original on 2018-09-11
- Geschwind, Ν. (1983). "Interictal behavioral changes in epilepsy". Epilepsia. 24 (S1): S23–S30. doi:10.1111/j.1528-1157.1983.tb04640.x. PMID 6617594. S2CID 22473877.
- Goodman, Russell (2003). "Transcendentalism". Stanford Encyclopedia of Philosophy.
- Griffiths, R. R.; Richards, W. A.; McCann, U.; Jesse, R. (2006). "Psilocybin can occasion mystical-type experiences having substantial and sustained personal meaning and spiritual significance". Psychopharmacology. 187 (3): 268–283. doi:10.1007/s00213-006-0457-5. PMID 16826400. S2CID 7845214.
- Gschwind, Markus; Picard, Fabienne (2014), "Ecstatic Epileptic Seizures – the Role of the Insula in Altered Self-Awareness" (PDF), Epileptologie, 31: 87–98, archived from the original (PDF) on 2016-10-09
- Gschwind, Markus; Picard, Fabienne (2016), "Ecstatic Epileptic Seizures: A Glimpse into the Multiple Roles of the Insula", Frontiers in Behavioral Neuroscience, 10: 21, doi:10.3389/fnbeh.2016.00021, PMC 4756129, PMID 26924970
- Habel, Norman; O'Donoghue, Michael; Maddox, Marion (1993). "Religious Experience". Myth, ritual and the sacred: Introducing the phenomena of religion. Underdale: University of South Australia.
- Harmless, William (2007), Mystics, Oxford University Press, ISBN 9780198041108
- Heffern, Rich (20 April 2001). "Exploring the biology of religious experience". NCR online.
- Hitt, Jack (1 November 1999). "This Is Your Brain on God". Wired. Archived from the original on 2021-04-28.
- Horne, James R. (1996), mysticism and Vocation, Wilfrid Laurier Univ. Press, ISBN 9780889202641
- Hood, Ralph W. (1975), "The Construction and Preliminary Validation of a Measure of Reported Mystical Experience", Journal for the Scientific Study of Religion, 14 (1): 29–41, doi:10.2307/1384454, JSTOR 1384454, S2CID 147200008
- Hood, Ralph W. (2003), "Mysticism", The Psychology of Religion. An Empirical Approach, New York: The Guilford Press, pp. 290–340
- Hood, Ralph W.; Streib, Heinz; Keller, Barbara; Klein, Constantin (2015), "The Contribution of the Study of "Spirituality" to the Psychology of Religion: Conclusions and Future Prospects", in Sreib, Heinz; Hood, Ralph W. (eds.), Semantics and Psychology of Spirituality: A Cross-Cultural Analysis, Springer
- Hori, Victor Sogen (1994), Teaching and Learning in the Zen Rinzai Monastery. In: Journal of Japanese Studies, Vol.20, No. 1, (Winter, 1994), 5–35 (PDF), archived from the original on 2019-10-19
- Hori, Victor Sogen (1999), Translating the Zen Phrase Book. In: Nanzan Bulletin 23 (1999) (PDF)
- Hori, Victor Sogen (2006), The Steps of Koan Practice. In: John Daido Loori, Thomas Yuho Kirchner (eds), Sitting With Koans: Essential Writings on Zen Koan Introspection, Wisdom Publications
- Hoyer, D.; Clarke, D. E.; Fozard, J. R.; Hartig, P. R.; Martin, G. R.; Mylecharane, E. J.; Saxena, P. R.; Humphrey, P. P. (June 1994). "International Union of Pharmacology classification of receptors for 5-hydroxytryptamine (Serotonin)". Pharmacological Reviews. 46 (2): 157–203. doi:10.1016/S0031-6997(25)06783-3. ISSN 0031-6997. PMID 7938165.
- Epstein, Ron (1997). Foreword. The Shurangama Sutra: The Fifty Skandha-Demon States. By Hua, Hsuan. Buddhist Text Translation Society. ISBN 9780881394016. Archived from the original on 2014-01-10.
- James, William (1982) [1902], The Varieties of Religious Experience, Penguin classics
- James, William (1985) [1902]. The Varieties of Religious Experience. Harvard University Press. ISBN 9780674932258.
- Jiyu-Kennett, Houn (2005a), Roar of the Tigress, volume I. An Introduction to Zen: Religious Practice for Everyday Life (PDF), MOUNT SHASTA, CALIFORNIA: SHASTA ABBEY PRESS
- Jiyu-Kennett, Houn (2005b), Roar of the Tigress, volume II. Zen for Spiritual Adults: Lectures Inspired by the Shōbōgenzō of Eihei Dōgen (PDF), MOUNT SHASTA, CALIFORNIA: SHASTA ABBEY PRESS
- Johnson, Matthew W.; Hendricks, Peter S.; Barrett, Frederick S.; Griffiths, Roland R. (2019). "Classic psychedelics: An integrative review of epidemiology, therapeutics, mystical experience, and brain network function". Pharmacology & Therapeutics. 197: 83–102. doi:10.1016/j.pharmthera.2018.11.010. PMID 30521880. S2CID 54467870.
- Jones, Richard H. (1983), Mysticism Examined, Albany: State University of New York Press
- Jones, Richard H. (2004), Mysticism and Morality, Lanham, Md.: Lexington Books
- Jones, Richard H. (2016), Philosophy of Mysticism: Raids on the Ineffable, Albany: State University of New York Press
- Jones, Richard H. (2021), An Introduction to the Study of Mysticism, Albany: State University of New York Press
- Jones, Richard; Gellman, Jerome (2022). "Mysticism". Stanford Encyclopedia of Philosophy.
- Jung, C. G. (1980). W. McGuire; R. F. C. Hull (eds.). C. G. Jung speaking: Interviews and encounters. London: Pan Books.
- Jylkkä, Jussi (2021). "Reconciling Mystical Experiences with Naturalistic Psychedelic Science: Reply to Sanders and Zijlmans". ACS Pharmacology & Translational Science. 4 (4): 1468–1470. doi:10.1021/acsptsci.1c00137. PMC 8369668. PMID 34423278.
- Kapleau, Philip (1989), The Three Pillars of Zen, Garden City: Anchor/Doubleday, ISBN 978-0-385-26093-0
- Katz, Steven T. (1978), "Language, Epistemology, and Mysticism", in Katz, Steven T. (ed.), Mysticism and Philosophical Analysis, Oxford university Press
- Katz, Steven T. (2000), Mysticism and Sacred Scripture, Oxford University Press
- Kim, Hee-Jin (2007), Dōgen on Meditation and Thinking: A Reflection on His View of Zen, SUNY Press
- King, Richard (1999), Orientalism and Religion: Post-Colonial Theory, India and "The Mystic East", Routledge
- King, Richard (2002), Orientalism and Religion: Post-Colonial Theory, India and "The Mystic East", Routledge
- Koenig, H. G. (2009). "Research on religion, spirituality, and mental health: a review". The Canadian Journal of Psychiatry. 54 (5): 283–291. doi:10.1177/070674370905400502. PMID 19497160. S2CID 14523984.
- Kraft, Kenneth (1997), Eloquent Zen: Daitō and Early Japanese Zen, University of Hawaii Press
- Laibelman, Alan M. (2007), Discreteness, Continuity, & Consciousness: An Epistemological Unified Field Theory, Peter Lang
- Lajoie, Denise H.; Shapiro, S. I. (1992). "Definitions of transpersonal psychology: The first twenty-three years" (PDF). The Journal of Transpersonal Psychology. 24 (1): 79–98. S2CID 147890656. ProQuest 1816469. Archived from the original (PDF) on 2026-01-25.
- Landtblom, A. M. (2006). "The "sensed presence": an epileptic aura with religious overtones". Epilepsy & Behavior. 9 (1): 186–188. doi:10.1016/j.yebeh.2006.04.023. PMID 16753347. S2CID 42370342.
- Leuba, J.H. (1925), The psychology of religious mysticism, Harcourt, Brace
- Lewis, Jone Johnson. "What is Transcendentalism?". Transcendentalists.com. Archived from the original on 2013-12-09.
- Lewis, James R.; Melton, J. Gordon (1992), Perspectives on the New Age, SUNY Press, ISBN 0-7914-1213-X
- Lewis, Ioan M. (1996). Religion in Context: Cults and Charisma. Cambridge: Cambridge University Press. ISBN 9780521562348.
- Lidke, Jeffrey S. (2005), Interpreting across Mystical Boundaries: An Analysis of Samadhi in the Trika-Kaula Tradition. In: Jacobson (2005), "Theory And Practice of Yoga: Essays in Honour of Gerald James Larson", pp 143–180, BRILL, ISBN 9004147578
- Low, Albert (2006), Hakuin on Kensho. The Four Ways of Knowing, Boston & London: Shambhala
- MacInnes, Elaine (2007), The Flowing Bridge: Guidance on Beginning Zen Koans, Wisdom Publications
- Maehle, Gregor (2007), Ashtanga Yoga: Practice and Philosophy, New World Library
- Maezumi, Taizan; Glassman, Bernie (2007), The Hazy Moon of Enlightenment, Wisdom Publications
- Main, Robert (2004). The rupture of time: Synchronicity and Jung's critique of modern western culture. Hove and New York: Brunner-Routledge. ISBN 1583912282.
- Masson, J. Moussaieff; Masson, T.C. (1976), "The Study of Mysticism: A Criticism of W.T. Stace", Journal of Indian Philosophy, 4 (1–2): 109–125, doi:10.1007/BF00211109, S2CID 170168616
- McGinn, Bernard (2006), The Essential Writings of Christian Mysticism, New York: Modern Library
- McMahan, David L. (2008), The Making of Buddhist Modernism, Oxford: Oxford University Press, ISBN 9780195183276
- McNamara, Patrick (2009). The Neuroscience of Religious Experience. Cambridge: Cambridge University Press. ISBN 978-0521889582.
- McNamara (2014), The neuroscience of religious experience (PDF)
- Melton, Gordon J., ed. (1990). "Theosophical Society". New Age Encyclopedia. Farmington Hills, Michigan: Gale Research. pp. 458–461. ISBN 0-8103-7159-6.
- Miller, Mandi M.; Strongman, Kenneth T. (2002). "The Emotional Effects of Music on Religious Experience: A Study of the Pentecostal-Charismatic Style of Music and Worship". Psychology of Music. 30: 8–27. doi:10.1177/0305735602301004. hdl:10092/104929. S2CID 145129077.
- Mota-Rolim, Sergio A.; Bulkeley, Kelly; Campanelli, Stephany; Lobão-Soares, Bruno; de Araujo, Draulio B.; Ribeiro, Sidarta (2020). "The Dream of God: How Do Religion and Science See Lucid Dreaming and Other Conscious States During Sleep?". Frontiers in Psychology. 11 555731. doi:10.3389/fpsyg.2020.555731. ISSN 1664-1078. PMC 7573223. PMID 33123040.
- Minsky, Marvin (2006), The Emotion Machine, Simon & Schuster
- Mithen, S. (1996). The prehistory of the mind: The cognitive origins of art and science. London: Thames and Hudson. ISBN 0500050813.
- Mohr, Michel (2000), Emerging from Nonduality. Koan Practice in the Rinzai Tradition since Hakuin. In: steven Heine & Dale S. Wright (eds.)(2000), "The Koan. texts and Contexts in Zen Buddhism", Oxford: Oxford University Press
- Moody, Raymond (1975). Life After Life. ISBN 0-06-251739-2.
- Moore, Peter G. (1973), "Recent Studies of Mysticism: A Critical Survey", Religion, 3 (2): 146–156, doi:10.1016/0048-721x(73)90005-5
- Moore, B.; Habel, N. (1982), When Religion Goes to School (Appendix 1), Adelaide: SACAE, pp. 184–218
- Moore, Peter (2005), "Mysticism (further considerations)", in Jones, Lindsay (ed.), MacMillan Encyclopedia of Religion, MacMillan
- Moores, D.J. (2006), Mystical Discourse in Wordsworth and Whitman: A Transatlantic Bridge, Peeters Publishers, ISBN 9789042918092
- Muesse, Mark W. (2011), The Hindu Traditions: A Concise Introduction, Fortress Press
- Mumon, Yamada (2004), Lectures On The Ten Oxherding Pictures, University of Hawaii Press
- Murray, Evan D.; Cunningham, Miles G.; Price, Bruce H. (September 2011). "The Role of Psychotic Disorders in Religious History Considered". Journal of Neuropsychiatry and Clinical Neurosciences. 24 (4). American Psychiatric Association: 410–426. doi:10.1176/appi.neuropsych.11090214. ISSN 1545-7222. OCLC 823065628. PMID 23224447.
- Nakamura, Hajime (2004), A History of Early Vedanta Philosophy. Part Two, Delhi: Motilal Banarsidass Publishers Private Limited
- Newberg, A.; Alavi, A.; Baime, M.; Pourdehnad, M.; Santanna, J.; d'Aquili, E. (2001). "The measurement of regional cerebral blood flow during the complex cognitive task of meditation: A preliminary SPECT study". Psychiatry Research: Neuroimaging. 106 (2): 113–122. doi:10.1016/s0925-4927(01)00074-9. PMID 11306250. S2CID 9230941. Archived from the original on 2010-02-04.
- Newberg, Andrew B.; D'Aquili, Eugene G.; Rause, Vince (2002). Why God Won't Go Away: Brain Science and the Biology of Belief. New York: Ballantine Books. ISBN 978-0-345-44034-1. Archived from the original on 2006-10-18.
- Newberg, Andrew; d'Aquili, Eugene (2008), Why God Won't Go Away: Brain Science and the Biology of Belief, Random House LLC, ISBN 9780307493156
- Newberg, Andrew; Waldman, Mark Robert (2009), How God Changes Your Brain, New York: Ballantine Books
- Nicholson, Andrew J. (2010), Unifying Hinduism: Philosophy and Identity in Indian Intellectual History, Columbia University Press
- Nutt, David; Chialvo, Dante R.; Tagliazucchi, Enzo; Feilding, Amanda; Shanahan, Murray; Hellyer, Peter John; Leech, Robert; Carhart-Harris, Robin Lester (2014). "The entropic brain: a theory of conscious states informed by neuroimaging research with psychedelic drugs". Frontiers in Human Neuroscience. 8: 20. doi:10.3389/fnhum.2014.00020. ISSN 1662-5161. PMC 3909994. PMID 24550805.
- Otto, Rudolf (1972) [1923]. The Idea of the Holy. London: Oxford University Press. pp. 5–30.
- Paden, William E. (2009), Comparative religion. In: John Hinnells (ed.) (2009), "The Routledge Companion to the Study of Religion", pp. 225–241, Routledge, ISBN 9780203868768
- Parsons, William B. (2011), Teaching Mysticism, Oxford University Press
- Paulson, Steve (20 September 2006). "Divining the brain". Salon. Archived from the original on 2026-01-24.
- "The Argument from Religious Experience". www.philosophyofreligion.info. Archived from the original on 2016-02-23.
- Picard, Fabienne (2013), "State of belief, subjective certainty and bliss as a product of cortical dysfuntion", Cortex, 49 (9): 2494–2500, doi:10.1016/j.cortex.2013.01.006, PMID 23415878, S2CID 206984751
- Picard, Fabienne; Kurth, Florian (2014), "Ictal alterations of consciousness during ecstatic seizures", Epilepsy & Behavior, 30: 58–61, doi:10.1016/j.yebeh.2013.09.036, PMID 24436968, S2CID 45743175
- Presinger, Michael A. (1987), Neuropsychological Bases of God Beliefs, New York: Praeger
- Previc, F. H. (1999). "Dopamine and the origins of human intelligence". Brain and Cognition. 41 (3): 299–350. doi:10.1006/brcg.1999.1129. PMID 10585240. S2CID 33252091.
- Previc, Fred H. (2006). "The role of the extrapersonal brain systems in religious activity". Consciousness and Cognition. 15 (3): 500–539. doi:10.1016/j.concog.2005.09.009. PMID 16439158. S2CID 16239814.
- Proudfoot, Wayne (1985), Religious Experiences, Berkeley: University of California Press
- Puligandla, Ramakrishna (1997), Fundamentals of Indian Philosophy, New York: D.K. Printworld (P) Ltd.
- Samy, AMA (1998), Waarom kwam Bodhidharma naar het Westen? De ontmoeting van Zen met het Westen, Asoka: Asoka
- Sanders, James W.; Zijlmans, Josjan (2021). "Moving Past Mysticism in Psychedelic Science". ACS Pharmacology & Translational Science. 4 (3): 1253–1255. doi:10.1021/acsptsci.1c00097. PMC 8205234. PMID 34151217.
- Sapolsky, Robert M. (1998). "Circling the Blanket for God". The Trouble with Testosterone: and Other Essays on the Biology of the Human Predicament. New York: A Touchstone Book, Simon & Schuster. ISBN 978-0-684-83409-2.
- Sawyer, Dana (2012), Afterword: The Man Who Took Religion Seriously: Huston Smith in Context. In: Jefferey Pane (ed.) (2012), "The Huston Smith Reader: Edited, with an Introduction, by Jeffery Paine", pp 237–246, University of California Press, ISBN 9780520952355
- Schjoedt, Uffe (2011). "The neural correlates of religious experience". Religion. 41 (1): 91–95. doi:10.1080/0048721x.2011.553132. S2CID 144891004.
- Schopenhauer, Arthur (1844), Die Welt als Wille und Vorstellung, vol. 2
- Schimmel, Annemarie (1975). Mystical Dimensions of Islam. University of North Carolina Press. ISBN 0807812714.
- Schleiermacher, F.D.E. (1958). On Religion: Speeches to its Cultured Despisers. Translated by Oman, J. New York: Harper & Row.
- Schweitzer, Albert (1938), Indian Thought and its Development, New York: Henry Holt
- Sekida, Katsuki (1985), Zen Training. Methods and Philosophy, New York, Tokyo: Weatherhill
- Sekida, Katsuki (1996), Two Zen Classics. Mumonkan, The Gateless Gate. Hekiganroku, The Blue Cliff Records. Translated with commentaries by Katsuki Sekida, New York / Tokyo: Weatherhill
- Sharf, Robert H. (1995), "Buddhist Modernism and the Rhetoric of Meditative Experience" (PDF), NUMEN, 42 (3): 228–283, doi:10.1163/1568527952598549, hdl:2027.42/43810
- Sharf, Robert H. (1995a), "Buddhist Modernism and the Rhetoric of Meditative Experience" (PDF), Numen, 42 (3): 228–283, doi:10.1163/1568527952598549, hdl:2027.42/43810
- Sharf, Robert H. (1995b), "Sanbokyodan. Zen and the Way of the New Religions" (PDF), Japanese Journal of Religious Studies, 22 (3–4), doi:10.18874/jjrs.22.3-4.1995.417-458
- Sharf, Robert H. (1995c). "Whose Zen? Zen Nationalism Revisited". In Heisig, James W.; Maraldo, John C. (eds.). Rude Awakenings: Zen, the Kyoto School and the Question of Nationalism. Honolulu: University of Hawaii Press. pp. 40–51. ISBN 9780824817466.
- Sharf, Robert H. (2000), "The Rhetoric of Experience and the Study of Religion" (PDF), Journal of Consciousness Studies, 7 (11–12): 267–87
- Shear, Jonathan (2011), "Eastern approaches to altered states of consciousness", in Cardeña, Etzel; Michael, Michael (eds.), Altering Consciousness: Multidisciplinary Perspectives, ABC-CLIO
- Shih, Hu (1953). "Ch'an (Zen) Buddhism in China: Its History and Method". Philosophy East and West. 3 (1): 3–24. doi:10.2307/1397361. JSTOR 1397361.
- Sivananda, Swami (1993), All About Hinduism, The Divine Life Society
- Sloan, R. P.; Bagliella, E.; Powell, T. (1999). "Religion, spirituality, and medicine". The Lancet. 353 (9153): 664–667. doi:10.1016/S0140-6736(98)07376-0. PMID 10030348. S2CID 36568822.
- Snelling, John (1987), The Buddhist handbook. A Complete Guide to Buddhist Teaching and Practice, London: Century Paperbacks
- Spilka, Bernard; McIntosh, Daniel N. (1995), "Attribution Theory and Religious Experience." In Ralph W. Hood, Jr. (ed.), The Handbook of Religious Experience, Birmingham, Al.: Religious Education Press, pp. 421–445
- Spilka, Bernard; Hood, Ralph W.; Hunsberger, Bruce (2003), The Psychology of Religion. An Empirical Approach, New York: The Guilford Press
- Stace, Walter (1960), Mysticism and Philosophy, London: Macmillan
- Storm, Jason Josephson (2021). Metamodernism: The Future of Theory. Chicago: University of Chicago Press. ISBN 978-0-226-78665-0.
- Takahashi, Shinkichi (2000), Triumph of the Sparrow: Zen Poems of Shinkichi Takahashi, Grove Press
- Taves, Ann (2009), Religious Experience Reconsidered, Princeton: Princeton University Press
- Taylor, Jill Bolte (2008). "My Stroke of Insight". TED.
- Tedrus, Glória Maria Almeida Souza; Fonseca, Lineu Corrêa; Höehr, Gabriela Chaves (2014). "Spirituality aspects in patients with epilepsy". Seizure. 23 (1): 25–28. doi:10.1016/j.seizure.2013.09.005. PMID 24094727.
- Trimble, M.; Freeman, A. (2006). "An investigation of religiosity and the Gastaut-Geschwind syndrome in patient with temporal lobe epilepsy". Epilepsy & Behavior. 9 (3): 407–414. doi:10.1016/j.yebeh.2006.05.006. PMID 16919503. S2CID 32726301.
- Tucker, Liz (20 March 2003). "God on the Brain". BBC. Archived from the original on 2025-11-13.
- Underhill, Evelyn (2012), Mysticism: A Study in the Nature and Development of Spiritual Consciousness, Courier Dover Publications, ISBN 9780486422381
- van Elk, Michiel; Aleman, André (February 2017). "Brain mechanisms in religion and spirituality: An integrative predictive processing framework" (PDF). Neuroscience & Biobehavioral Reviews. 73: 359–378. doi:10.1016/j.neubiorev.2016.12.031. ISSN 0149-7634. PMID 28041787. S2CID 3984198. Archived from the original (PDF) on 2025-11-12.
- Van Eyghen, Hans (2020). Arguing from Cognitive Science of Religion. Is Religious Belief Debunked? (PDF). Bloomsbury Academic. ISBN 9781350100329. Archived from the original (PDF) on 2025-08-27.
- Venkataramiah, Munagala (1936), Talks with Sri Ramana Maharshi, Tiruvannamalai: Sri Ramanasramam
- Waaijman, Kees (2000), Spiritualiteit. Vormen, grondslagen, methoden, Kampen/Gent: Kok/Carmelitana
- Waaijman, Kees (2002), Spirituality: Forms, Foundations, Methods, Peeters Publishers
- Waddell, Norman (2010), Foreword to "Wild Ivy: The Spiritual Autobiography of Zen Master Hakuin", Shambhala Publications
- Wainwright, William J. (1981), Mysticism, Madison: University of Wisconsin Press
- Watts, Alan (January 1968). "Psychedelics and Religious Experience". California Law Review. 56 (1): 74–85. doi:10.2307/3479497. JSTOR 3479497.
- White, David Gordon, ed. (2000), Tantra in Practice, Princeton University Press, ISBN 0-691-05779-6
- White, David Gordon (2012), The Alchemical Body: Siddha Traditions in Medieval India, University of Chicago Press, ISBN 9780226149349
- Wilber, Ken (1996), The Atman Project: A Transpersonal View of Human Development, Quest Books, ISBN 9780835607308
- Williams, Thomas D.; Bengtsson, Jan Olof (2016). "Personalism". In Zalta, Edward N. (ed.). The Stanford Encyclopedia of Philosophy (Summer 2016 ed.). Metaphysics Research Lab, Stanford University.
- Wright, Dale S. (2000), Philosophical Meditations on Zen Buddhism, Cambridge: Cambridge University Press
- Om, Swami (2014), If Truth Be Told: A Monk's Memoir, Harper Collins
- Yen, Chan Master Sheng (1996), Dharma Drum: The Life and Heart of Ch'an Practice, Boston & London: Shambhala
- Zaehner, R. C. (1957), Mysticism Sacred and Profane: An Inquiry into some Varieties of Praeternatural Experience, Clarendon
- Zaehner, R. C. (1974), Our Savage God: The Perverse Use of Eastern Thought, Sheed and Ward
- Zimmer, Heinrich (1948), De weg tot het Zelf. Leer en leven van de Indische heilige, Sri Ramana Maharshi uit Tiruvannamalai, 's Graveland: Uitgeverij De Driehoek
