= Norman Habel =

Australian Old Testament scholar (born 1932)

Norman Charles Habel AM (born 1932) is an Australian Old Testament scholar. His ancestors are Wends from the forests of Prussia.

Habel was born near Hamilton, Victoria, and was ordained in the Evangelical Lutheran Church in Australia in 1955, serving as pastor of Trinity Lutheran Church in Brooklyn. He taught at Concordia Seminary in St. Louis in the run up to the Seminex controversy, and then at Adelaide College of the Arts and Education, before becoming Principal of Kodaikanal International School in South India. Habel then returned to South Australia, serving as professor at the University of South Australia and then Flinders University.

In 2003, Habel was awarded the Member of the Order of Australia, for "service to education and the development of courses in religious studies in tertiary institutions in Australia, to reconciliation and social justice, and to the environment." In 2013, a Festschrift was published in his honour. Where the Wild Ox Roams: Biblical Essays in Honour of Norman C. Habel included contributions from David J. A. Clines and Ralph W. Klein.
