= Eugene G. d'Aquili =

American physician

Eugene G. d'Aquili (1940–1998) was a research psychiatrist who specialized in studying members of religious communities (e.g., brain image scans).

== Works ==
- Why God Won't Go Away: Brain Science and the Biology of Belief (2001) with Andrew Newberg (Author) and Vince Rause, Ballantine Books
- The Mystical Mind: Probing the Biology of Religious Experience (1999) with Andrew B. Newberg, Fortress Press
- Brain, Symbol and Experience: Toward a Neurophenomenology of Human Consciousness (1990) with Charles D. Laughlin and John McManus, New Science Library
- The Spectrum of Ritual: A Biogenetic Structural Analysis (1979) with Charles D. Laughlin and John McManus, Columbia University Press
- Biogenetic Structuralism (1974) with Charles D. Laughlin, Columbia University Press
- The Biopsychological Determinants of Culture (1972) Addison-Wesley
