= Robert A. Rubinstein =

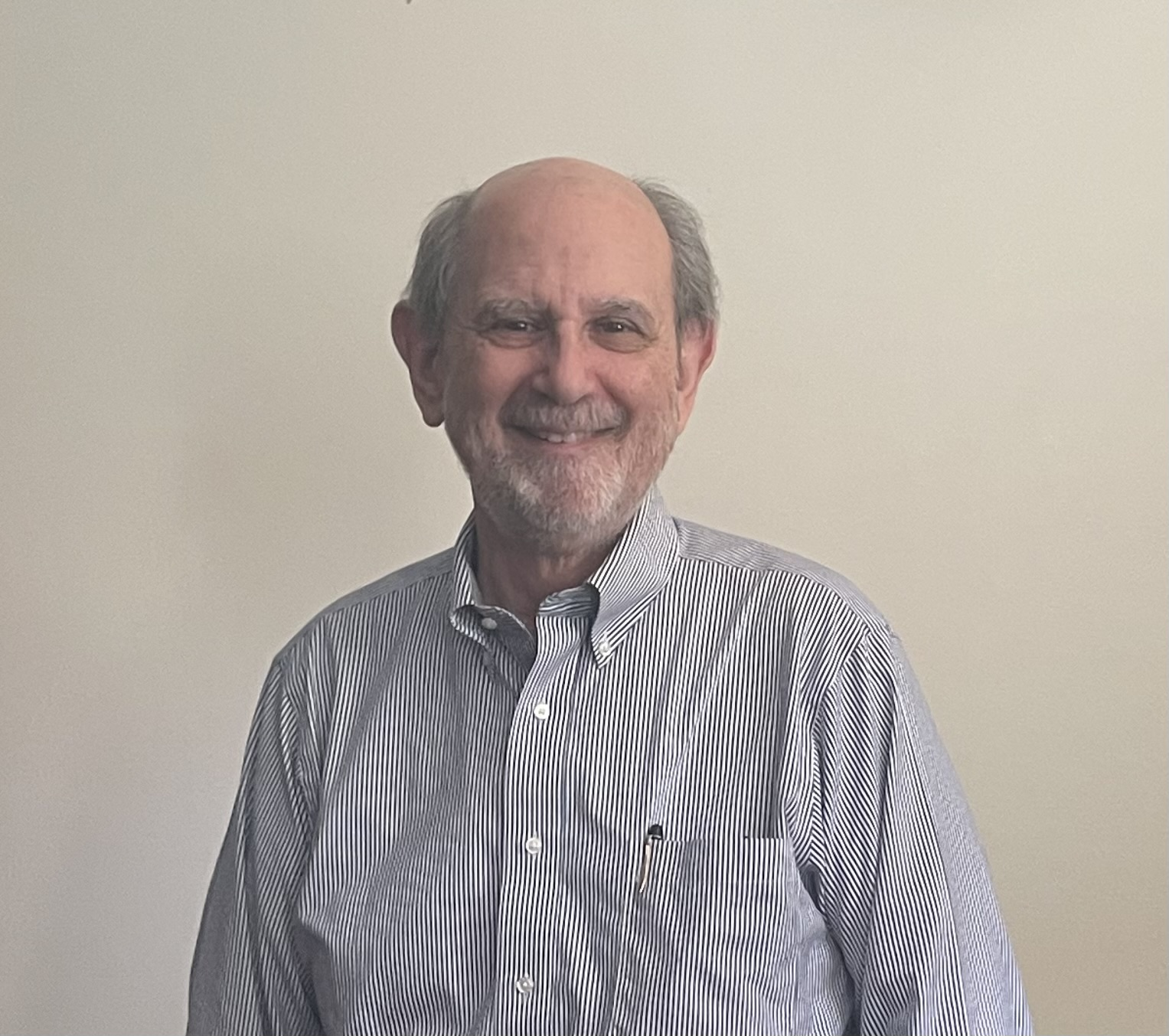
Professor Rubinstein in a classroom at Syracuse University (2026)

Robert A. Rubinstein (born 1951) is a cultural anthropologist whose work bridges the areas of political and medical anthropology, and the history and theory of the discipline. He is a Distinguished Professor of Anthropology and Professor of International Relations at the Maxwell School of Syracuse University.

== Education and research ==
Rubinstein received his Ph.D. in anthropology from the State University of New York at Binghamton in 1977. He received a master's degree in public health from the University of Illinois at Chicago in 1983.

Rubinstein has conducted overseas research in urban and rural Egypt, where he lived from 1988 to 1992, and in Belize and Mexico. In the United States, he has conducted research in Atlanta, Chicago, and Syracuse.

== Organizations ==
In 1983, Rubinstein was a founding member of the Commission on Peace and Human Rights of the International Union of Anthropological and Ethnological Sciences. He is co-chair of the commission, and from 2000 to 2004 he was editor of the commission's official journal, Social Justice: Anthropology, Peace and Human Rights.

Rubinstein was from 1999 to 2013 a member of the board of directors of the Ploughshares Fund, Fort Mason, San Francisco, California.

He received the 2016 The Victor Sidel and Barry Levy Award for Peace from the American Public Health Association , the 2010 Robert B. Textor and Family Prize for Anticipatory Anthropology from the American Anthropological Association and the 2026 Sol Tax Distinguished Service Award from the Society for Applied Anthropology https://appliedanthro.org/awards-prizes/distinguished-awards/sol-tax-award/2026-robert-rubinstein/

== Theories ==
Rubinstein applies a multilevel theoretical perspective to examining aspects of human social life. Since proposing in 1984 the "Rule of Minimal Inclusion," in Science as Cognitive Process (which says that adequate accounts of human phenomena must include information about the adjacent levels of systemic organization to those at the level of the phenomenon investigated) Rubinstein has applied this perspective to a variety of areas.

He used this view to explore the variety of ways in which culture is important to peacekeeping operations. Beginning in the mid-1980s he published a series of articles that show how the success of peacekeeping missions are critically dependent upon understanding the culture of the people among whom the mission works, and the importance of understanding the organizational cultures of the agencies who work together in a mission.

He applies this view in medical anthropology where he has made theoretical contributions and also shown how multilevel analysis is critical for understanding racial and ethnic disparities in health.

== Selected works ==
=== Selected books ===
- Rubinstein, Robert A., Charles D. Laughlin, and John McManus. 1984. Science as Cognitive Process: Toward an Empirical Philosophy of Science. Philadelphia, PA: University of Pennsylvania Press.
- Rubinstein, Robert A. and Hendrik Pinxten, eds. 1984. Epistemology and Process: Anthropological Views. Ghent, Belgium: Communication and Cognition Books.
- Foster, Mary LeCron and Robert A. Rubinstein, 1986. Peace and War: Cross-cultural Perspectives. New Brunswick, NJ: Transaction Books.
- Rubinstein, Robert A. and Mary LeCron Foster, 1988. The Social Dynamics of Peace and Conflict: Culture in International Security. Boulder, Co: Westview Press.
- Rubinstein, Robert A., ed. 2001. Doing Fieldwork: The Correspondence of Robert Redfield and Sol Tax. New Brunswick, NJ:Transaction Books.

=== Peacekeeping and culture ===
- Rubinstein, R.A., Culture, International Affairs and Multilateral Peacekeeping: Confusing Process and Pattern, CULTURAL DYNAMICS 2(1):41-61, 1989.
- Rubinstein, R.A., Cultural Aspects of Peacekeeping: Notes on the Substance of Symbols, MILLENNIUM: JOURNAL OF INTERNATIONAL STUDIES 22(3):547-562, 1993.
- Rubinstein, R.A. Peacekeeping Under Fire: Understanding the Social Construction of the Legitimacy of Multilateral Intervention, HUMAN PEACE 11(4):22-29, 1998.
- Rubinstein, R.A. Methodological Challenges in the Ethnographic Study of Multilateral Peacekeeping, POLITICAL AND LEGAL ANTHROPOLOGY REVIEW 21(1):138-149, 1998.
- Rubinstein, R.A., Intervention and Culture: An Anthropological Approach to Peace Operations, SECURITY DIALOGUE 36(4):527-544, 2005.
- Rubinstein, R.A. Peacekeeping Under Fire: Culture and Intervention. Boulder, CO: Paradigm Publishers, 2008.

=== Multilevel analysis and health ===
- Rubinstein, R. A., S.D. Lane, S. Sallam, A. Sheta, Z.Gad, A.R. Sherif, M. Selim, A. Gad, A. Shama, J. Schachter, C.R. Dawson, Controlling Blinding Trachoma in the Egyptian Delta: Integrating Clinical, Epidemiological and Anthropological Understandings, ANTHROPOLOGY AND MEDICINE 13(2): 99–118, 2005.
- S.D. Lane, S.D. Lane, R.H. Keefe, R.A. Rubinstein, B.A. Levandowski, M. Freedman, A. Rosenthal, D.A. Cibula, and M. Czerwinski, Marriage Promotion and Missing Men: African American Women in a Demographic Double Bind, MEDICAL ANTHROPOLOGY QUARTERLY 18(2): 405–428, 2004.
- S.D. Lane, R.A. Rubinstein, R. Keefe, N. Webster, D. Cibula, A. Rosenthal and J. Dowdell, Structural Violence and Racial Disparity in HIV Transmission, JOURNAL OF HEALTH CARE FOR THE POOR AND UNDERSERVED 15:319-335, 2004.
- Rubinstein, R.A., Scrimshaw, S., and S. Morrissey, S., Classification and Process in Sociomedical Understanding: Towards a Multilevel View of Sociomedical Methodology, Handbook of Social Studies in Health and Medicine, G. Albrecht, R. Fitzpatrick, and S. Scrimshaw, editors. London: Sage. pp. 36–49, 2000.
