= List of people with epilepsy =

This is a list of notable people who have, or had, the medical condition epilepsy. Following from that, there is a short list of people who have received a speculative, retrospective diagnosis of epilepsy. Finally there is a substantial list of people who are often wrongly believed to have had epilepsy.

A possible link between epilepsy and "greatness" has fascinated biographers and physicians for centuries. In his Treatise on Epilepsy, the French 17th-century physician Jean Taxil refers to Aristotle's "famous epileptics". This list includes Heracles, Ajax, Bellerophon, Socrates, Plato, Empedocles, Maracus of Syracuse, and the Sibyls. However, historian of medicine Owsei Temkin argues that Aristotle had in fact made a list of melancholics and had only associated Heracles with the "Sacred Disease". Taxil goes on to add his own names: Roman Emperor Caligula, Drusus (tribune of the Roman people), and Petrarch. Neurologist John Hughes concluded that the majority of famous people alleged to have epilepsy did not in fact have this condition.

== Certain diagnosis ==
The following categorized chronological list contains only those people for whom a firm and uncontested diagnosis was made during their lifetime.

=== Acting ===
Name	Life	Comments	Reference
Bud Abbott	1895–1974	Comedian (half of the "Abbott and Costello" duo) who had epilepsy all his life, but tried to control and hide it.	
Ward Bond	1903–1960	A film actor. His epilepsy led to his exclusion from the draft during World War II.	
Michael Wilding	1912-1979	English TV, film and stage actor. Former husband of Elizabeth Taylor. Died as a result of head injuries sustained as a result of a fall after an epileptic seizure.	
Bob Fosse	1927–1987	An American actor, choreographer, dancer, and film and stage director. In 1961, Fosse's epilepsy was revealed when he had a seizure onstage during rehearsals for The Conquering Hero.	
Rip Taylor	1931-2019	An American actor and comedian, Taylor died in 2019 having been hospitalized for having an epileptic seizure a week prior.	
Boryslav Brondukov	1938–2004	A Ukrainian film character actor, People's Artist of the Ukrainian SSR. Epilepsy seizures from 1998.	
Pete Duel	1940–1971	A television and film actor whose epilepsy is thought to have been brought on during adolescence by head injuries sustained in an automobile accident.	
Danny Glover	born 1946	An actor and film director who had epilepsy from age 15 to age 35.	
Michael Jeter	1952-2003	American stage and screen actor who died from having an epileptic seizure.	
Margaux Hemingway	1955–1996	A film actress and model who had epilepsy from the age of seven. Her death was attributed to suicide by an intentional overdose of phenobarbital, which is an anticonvulsant, but see the footnoted article for an alternative explanation.	
Melanie Griffith	born 1957	American actress whose seizures are thought to be induced by stress	
Rik Mayall	1958-2014	Successful comedy actor in various UK comedy series and some comedy films. He developed epilepsy arising from a quad bike accident in 1998.	
Sharon Stone	born 1958	Actress who played major roles in blockbuster movies including Total Recall, Basic Instinct, and Casino (among others). She suffered a subarachnoid hemorrhage in 2001 that led to seizures that still require medications for control as of 2023. She has also stated that she will have seizures without getting 8 hours of sleep.	
Hugo Weaving	born 1960	An actor who has taken anticonvulsants for epilepsy since his first seizure at age 13.	
Martin Kemp	born 1961	Actor and former bassist with the pop band Spandau Ballet. He developed epilepsy after having two brain tumours in the 1990s.	
Barbie Hsu	1976-2025	Taiwanese actress and star of the Mandarin-speaking TV show Meteor Garden, former TV host and pop star. She had a medical history of epilepsy and heart disease.	
Júlia Almeida	born 1983	Brazilian actress	
Fatima Sana Shaikh	born 1992	An Indian actress who has had epilepsy for much of her life.	
Laura Neiva	born 1993	Brazilian actress and model	
Sara Thompson	born 1995	A Canadian actress best known for playing "Molly Ross" in Burden of Truth (TV Series) who has also starred in films and is also a dancer. As part of the Orange Daisy Project she seeks to promote mental health in young women and has had epilepsy since the age of sixteen.	
Cameron Boyce	1999–2019	An actor best known for his roles as Luke Ross on the Disney Channel series Jessie and as Carlos on the TV film Descendants, previously diagnosed with epilepsy. Boyce died of sudden unexpected death in epilepsy (SUDEP).	

=== Leadership, politics and royalty ===
Name	Life	Comments	Reference
Michael IV the Paphlagonian	1010–1041	A Byzantine emperor who had frequent tonic-clonic seizures since adolescence. The seizures were interpreted at the time to be demonic possession as punishment for his sins. His royal entourage were alert to signs of an impending seizure and tried to hide the emperor when he was ill.	
Pedro I of Brazil	1798–1834	Founder and first emperor of the Empire of Brazil. There are many accounts of him having seizures throughout his life, just like his sister Infanta Isabel Maria of Braganza. One author describes them happening as early as 1811, when he was thirteen years old.	
Hans Ulrik Gyldenløve	1615–1645	Illegitimate son of Christian IV, King of Denmark and Norway, Hans Ulrik was an officer in the Danish Royal Navy and the commander of a royal castle, the Kronborg. He was prone to epileptic incidents, and during a state visit to Spain with his father's ambassador in 1640, he had a seizure shortly after a bullfight. He had to be sent home to Denmark.	
Ivan V Alekseyevich	1666–1696	Older half brother of Russian Tsar Peter the Great. Ivan V was feeble-minded, epileptic, and half-blind. Would have never become Tsar except for the support of his sister Sophia, who wanted to become regent over him. His sister, with the military backing of the Streltsy, made Ivan V rule as co-tsar with Peter I (Great) (who had already been tsar for a few weeks).	
José Antonio Páez	1790–1873	Former President of Venezuela Statesman and Military Commander who fought in the Venezuelan War of Independence against Spain for Simón Bolívar. He had epilepsy also while a battlefield Commander.	
Pope Pius IX	1792–1878	Had childhood epilepsy.	
Francis Libermann	1802–1852	A Jew who converted to Christianity and studied for priesthood. Epilepsy prevented his ordination for many years.	
Ida McKinley	1847–1907	First Lady of the United States from 1897 to 1901. Her epilepsy started in adulthood and was to become quite disabling and inconvenient. As was normal for the time, great efforts were made to keep this secret. Her husband, William McKinley, would cover her face with a napkin when she had symptoms at dinner parties.	
Vladimir Lenin	1870–1924	First Premier of the Soviet Union. Lenin's final year was characterized by neurological decline and loss of function. In his last few months, he developed epilepsy. His seizures worsened and he died in status epilepticus, which had lasted 50 minutes.	
Caligula	AD 12–41	Roman Emperor. Suetonius states that "As a boy he was troubled with the falling sickness [epilepsy], and while in his youth he had some endurance, yet at times because of sudden faintness he was hardly able to walk, to stand up, to collect his thoughts, or to hold up his head."	
Prince Erik, Duke of Västmanland	1889–1918	The youngest son of Gustaf V of Sweden.	
Prince John of the United Kingdom	1905–1919	The youngest son of King George V, John had epilepsy from the age of 4 until his death after a seizure aged 13. John's epilepsy, along with intellectual disability and possibly autism, led to his living most of his life at York Cottage on the Sandringham Estate away from visitors who were not family members.	
Rabbi Lionel Blue	1930–2016	A rabbi and broadcaster, best known for his contributions to "Thought for the Day" on BBC Radio 4's Today program. His epilepsy was diagnosed when he was aged 57 and is successfully controlled with medication.	
Dave Longaberger	1934–1999	A businessman and founder of The Longaberger Company, makers of handcrafted maple wood baskets and accessories. He overcame epilepsy and a stutter, eventually graduating from high school aged 21.	
Joe Doyle	1936–2009	Joe Doyle was an Irish Fine Gael politician. He was a long-standing public representative for the Dublin South-East and served as a member of Dáil Éireann, Seanad Éireann and Dublin City Council before serving as Lord Mayor of Dublin from 1998 to 1999. He first developed epilepsy at the age of 16. He became one of Ireland's most prominent advocate's for epilepsy and was a member of the board of directors of Brainwave, the Irish Epilepsy Association, at the time of his death.	
Neil Abercrombie	born 1938	The former Governor of Hawaii who campaigned for increased funding for epilepsy research. He was diagnosed with epilepsy in his early thirties.	
Rudi Dutschke	1940–1979	A prominent spokesperson of the left-wing German student movement of the 1960s. An assassination attempt in 1968, when he was shot twice in the head, left him partially blind and with frequent epileptic attacks. He drowned in the bathtub after having a seizure.	
Tony Coelho	born 1942	A former United States congressman who developed epilepsy aged 16, possibly as a result of an earlier head injury. This would lead to rejection by his family and the Jesuits for "possession by the devil". He has campaigned as a congressman for disabled rights and chairs the Epilepsy Foundation's national board of directors.	
Eamonn McCann	born 1943	A former Northern Ireland People Before Profit MLA from Derry and Councillor who developed epilepsy in 2006.	
John Roberts	born 1955	Roberts is the 17th Chief Justice of the United States. He was appointed to office by President George W. Bush on 29 September 2005. His first seizure occurred in 1993 which was disclosed to the Senate Judiciary Committee who confirmed him. His second seizure occurred in 2008 when he fell 5 to 10 feet onto a dock near his house.	
Denis O'Donovan	born 1955	O'Donovan is an Irish Fianna Fáil politician who has served as a Senator from 1989 to 1992, 1997-2002 and since 2007. He was appointed to serve as Cathaoirleach of Seanad Éireann from 2016 to 2020 and also served as a TD for Cork South-West from 2002 to 2007. He first had a grand-mal seizure in 2020 and later episodes which left him close to death. He has since spoken publicly about his experiences in the role of an advocate.	
Laura Sandys	born 1964	British Conservative Party politician. She was elected at the 2010 general election as the Member of Parliament (MP) for South Thanet. She revealed in parliament in October 2010 that she had epilepsy, but had been seizure-free for seven years.	
Paul Maynard	born 1975	British Conservative Party politician. He was elected at the 2010 general election as the Member of Parliament (MP) for Blackpool North and Cleveleys. In 2010, he was appointed vice-president of the charity Epilepsy Action.	
Patrick O'Donovan	born 1977	Irish Fine Gael Party politician. He was elected at the 2011 Irish general election as a Teachta Dála (TD) for Limerick. He had previously served as a Councillor on Limerick County Council from 2003 to 2011 and is a former schoolteacher. He was diagnosed with photosensitive epilepsy having collapsed in the Dáil Eireann Chamber on 29 June 2023.	
Michael Long	born 19??	Northern-Irish Alliance Party of Northern Ireland politician. He was elected as a member of Belfast City Council in 2014 and served as Lord Mayor of the City from May-June 2022 together as being the party's Leader on the same local authority. On 8 March 2024 he revealed he had suffered a massive seizure having first undergone experienced one in 2020.	
Eoghan Kenny	born 2000	Irish Labour Party politician. He was elected at the 2024 Irish general election as a Teachta Dála (TD) for Cork North-Central. He had previously served as a Councillor on Cork County Council from 2024 and is a former Schoolteacher. He was diagnosed with epilepsy during the 2024 Irish general election campaign as he had a seizure while preparing for a RTE Drivetime Radio Programme.	

=== Music ===
Name	Life	Comments	Reference
Jimmy Reed	1925–1976	An American blues singer. His epilepsy diagnosis in 1957 was delayed due to an assumption that he was suffering from attacks of delirium tremens. He died after an epileptic seizure aged 51.	
Neil Young	born 1945	Canadian singer-songwriter, formerly of bands Buffalo Springfield and Crosby, Stills, Nash & Young. Disliked the effects of his medication; seeking personal stability as an alternative means of control.	
Lindsey Buckingham	born 1949	The guitarist and singer in the music group Fleetwood Mac was taken to hospital after a seizure while on tour, aged 29. His epilepsy was successfully controlled by anticonvulsant drugs.	
Chris Knox	born 1952	New Zealand indie musician (Toy Love, Tall Dwarfs) has addressed his epilepsy in such songs as "Lapse", and it is also referenced in his album title Seizure.	
Mike Nolan	born 1954	Singer and one of the four original members of the British pop group Bucks Fizz. Developed epilepsy after a coach accident in 1985.	
Ian Curtis	1956–1980	The vocalist and lyricist of the band Joy Division was diagnosed with epilepsy aged 22. The cover of their album Unknown Pleasures resembles an EEG tracing, but is actually the tracings of the radio emissions of a pulsar. He would often suffer grand mal seizures while performing and his dancing would mimic the seizures he suffered. The condition was a primary cause of his suicide in 1980 aged 23.	
Marie Fredriksson	1958–2019	A Swedish pop singer, songwriter, pianist and painter. She collapsed in a bathroom after becoming nauseated, with the impact of the fall fracturing her cranium. She then had an epileptic seizure.	
Prince	1958–2016	American singer, who had epilepsy as a child and sang about his condition in the song "The Sacrifice of Victor".	
Richard Jobson	born 1960	Formerly the lead singer with the punk rock group The Skids, now a television presenter and film maker. He has absence seizures.	
Susan Boyle	born 1961	Scottish singer who came to international public attention when she appeared as a contestant on the TV programme Britain's Got Talent on 11 April 2011. She had epilepsy as a child.	
Peter Jefferies	born ca.1961	New Zealand musician (Nocturnal Projections, This Kind of Punishment).	
Hikari Ōe	born 1963	A Japanese composer who has autism, epilepsy and intellectual disability and has created two successful classical-music CDs. He is the son of Kenzaburō Ōe, the Japanese novelist who won the 1994 Nobel Prize in Literature.	
Vusi Mahlasela	born 1965	A singer-songwriter whose work inspired those in the anti-apartheid movement.	
Tone Loc	born 1966	American actor, rapper, voice actor, and producer known for his raspy voice, his hit songs "Wild Thing" and "Funky Cold Medina". Tone Lōc has collapsed onstage multiple times since 1995; some if not all of these collapses have been due to seizures, according to at least one report.	
Adam Horovitz	born 1966	Member of the music group Beastie Boys.	
Edith Bowman	born 1974	Scottish television presenter and a radio D.J., who had epilepsy as a child.	
Mike Skinner	born 1978	Also known as The Streets, he had epilepsy between the ages of 7 and 20.	
Geoff Rickly	born 1979	A member of the band Thursday, who discovered he had epilepsy while on tour.	
Shane Yellowbird	1979–2022	Canadian country-music singer songwriter. He had been suffering from epilepsy and died of a grand mal seizure.	
Lil Wayne	born 1982	American rapper revealed in March 2013 that he has epilepsy. He has suffered with the disease since childhood and admits that he rarely remembers his seizures.	
Richard Walters	born 1982	Critically acclaimed UK solo artist and writer who has released 4 albums and 5 EPs since 2007 some of which has featured on TV shows such as Grey's Anatomy, CSI Miami, and After Life. Grammy nominated, he has embarked on a solo career since 2006 following his return to music after his diagnosis of epilepsy. In the song "Red Brick" he refers to his epilepsy medication with the lyric: "Don't hide my medicine."	
Jinxx	born 1986	An American musician and member of the Black Veil Brides, diagnosed with epilepsy at the age of 27 after having a seizure at a gig.	
George Watsky	born 1986	An American rapper, poet, producer and songwriter who set the Guinness World Record for the longest rapping marathon. He inherited epilepsy and has written about his experiences with the condition in his debut book How to Ruin Everything.	
Lauren Pritchard	born 1987	An American singer, songwriter and actress who appeared in the original Broadway cast of Spring Awakening.	
George Joji Kusunoki Miller	born 1993	Japanese-Australian singer-songwriter, rapper, and record producer. While Miller has kept his personal life and health extremely private, he revealed that he was diagnosed with a neurological condition that causes him to have stress induced seizures in 2014. Since then he has mentioned his condition and the medication he takes daily to manage it in several interviews. He has also been forced to cancel a number of live performances citing health reasons. However, it's worth mentioning that Miler himself has not used the word epilepsy to describe his condition, most likely in an attempt to dissuade his fans from digging into his health.	

=== Sport ===
Name	Life	Comments	Reference
Grover Cleveland Alexander	1887–1950	A major league baseball pitcher who tried to hide his epilepsy with alcohol, which was at the time considered to be a more socially acceptable problem. Ty Cobb said he "suffered hell on the field."	
Tony Lazzeri	1903–1946	A major league baseball player who probably died after seizure that occurred when he was alone at home.	
Hal Lanier	born 1942	A major league baseball player and manager. He developed epilepsy after a severe beating.	
Tony Greig	1946–2012	A former cricketer and commentator who was involved with Epilepsy Action Australia. He had his first seizure, aged 14, during a tennis game but has successfully controlled his epilepsy with medication.	
Mike Adamle	born 1949	A former running back in the NFL, host of American Gladiators and Manager of WWE RAW. He has epilepsy and received a Personal Achievement Award for his work with the Epilepsy Foundation in 2007 where he is a member of the Greater Chicago Division Board of Directors. An active fundraiser, Adamle was diagnosed with dementia in 2017 and that his CTE diagnosis could have resulted from his years of epileptic seizures a consequence of his concussions on the field of play.	
Buddy Bell	born 1951	A major league baseball player and manager.	
Bobby Jones	born 1951	A Hall of Fame basketball player who developed epilepsy and a heart problem as an adult, but persevered with his game.	
Vyacheslav Lemeshev	1952–1996	An Olympic boxer from the USSR. The youngest Olympic champion in boxing history, at the age of 28 he was already a sick person. Brain vascular atrophy developed, vision was severely impaired, liver problems were encountered and psoriasis and epilepsy.	
Terry Marsh	born 1958	A boxer who was IBF world light-welterweight champion. His diagnosis of epilepsy in 1987, aged 29, forced him into retirement undefeated.	
Greg Walker	born 1959	A major league baseball player who collapsed on field with a tonic-clonic seizure. He had a further seizure in hospital that night and took anticonvulsant medication for the next two years. Walker had a childhood history of seizures until the age of 4.	
Florence Griffith Joyner	1959–1998	A track and field athlete with world records in the 100 m and 200 m. She developed seizures in her thirties, possibly due to a cavernous angioma that was discovered on autopsy. She died from asphyxiation after a grand mal seizure while asleep.	
Wally Lewis	born 1959	One of Australia's greatest rugby league players, national team captain 1984–89. After retirement from the sport, he became a television sports presenter, but became disoriented during a live-to-air broadcast in late 2006. Medical tests revealed that he had epilepsy.	
Paul Wade	born 1962	Former Australian national Football (soccer) player and television sports commentator. Wade had epilepsy all his life but was only diagnosed as an adult. He kept it secret until he had a seizure on live television in 2001. Drugs weren't controlling the seizures so, in 2002, he had surgery to remove a scar in his brain. He is now seizure free.	
Marion Clignet	born 1964	A Franco-American cyclist who found that she has epilepsy at the age of 22. She was shunned by the U.S. cycling federation and subsequently rode in the colors of France. She has since won six world titles, two Olympic silver medals, and numerous races worldwide.	
Maggie McEleny	born 1965	Four times British Paralympic swimmer, winning 3 gold, 5 silver and 7 bronze. McEleny has paraplegia and epilepsy. In 2000, she was made an MBE and awarded a Golden Jubilee Award by the British Epilepsy Association.	
Mikhail Tatarinov	born 1966	A retired Russian ice hockey defenceman. Alcohol withdrawal epilepsy seizures.	
Matt Crooks	Born 1994	British footballer affectionately nicknamed "Tree" due to his height. First had a seizure at 18 and works closely with the Peter Doody Foundation	
Hervé Boussard	1966–2013	An Olympic cyclist of France who won a bronze medal at the 1992 Summer Olympics. He died from an epileptic seizure.	
Jonty Rhodes	born 1969	A cricketer who is involved with Epilepsy South Africa.	
Tom Smith	1971–2022	Former Scottish international and Northampton Saints rugby player. He had epilepsy since the age of 18. His seizures occurred only at night, during sleep. He was a patron of the Scottish epilepsy charity, Enlighten.	
Ronde Barber	born 1975	A former American football player who played cornerback with the Tampa Bay Buccaneers.	
Tiki Barber	born 1975	A former American football player, who played running back for the New York Giants.	
Alan Faneca	born 1976	An American football guard in the pro football Hall of Fame. The nine-time All-Pro was diagnosed with epilepsy at the age of 15 and takes the anticonvulsant carbamazepine, which successfully controls his seizures.	
Samari Rolle	born 1976	A former American football cornerback who played for the Baltimore Ravens.	
Chanda Gunn	born 1980	A goalie in the US 2006 Winter Olympic women's hockey team. Gunn was diagnosed with juvenile absence epilepsy at the age of 9, which was treated with valproic acid. Epilepsy meant that she had to give up her childhood sports of swimming and surfing, but these were soon replaced with hockey.	
Emma Beamish	born 1982	A member of the Ireland women's cricket team. Seizure-free since 2018 Beamish has spoken publicly about her anxiety that seizures may re-occur and her decision not to have children as a result.	
Jason Snelling	born 1983	An American football player with the Atlanta Falcons.	
Davis Tarwater	born 1984	An Olympic swimmer for the United States who had epilepsy as a child	
Andrei Kostitsyn	born 1985	A Belarusian professional ice hockey forward for HC Dinamo Minsk of the Kontinental Hockey League (KHL). The hockey player suffered several serious epilepsy seizures in one month. He was treated in Canada in 2004.	
Leon Legge	born 1985	An English professional footballer, who currently plays for Port Vale as a central defender. His epilepsy is currently controlled.	
Dai Greene	born 1986	A Welsh hurdler who specialises in the 400 metres hurdles event. Greene is the current European, Commonwealth and World Champion.	
Katharine Ford	born 1986	An Ultra-marathon cyclist and Indoor Track Cycling four time world record holder, who was diagnosed with epilepsy aged 9 before undergoing major transformative brain surgery to control her condition.	
Lance Franklin	born 1987	An Australian Football League player who has had Epilepsy since 2015.	
Jeremy Jeffress	born 1987	A baseball pitcher named as an all-star in 2018 with the Milwaukee Brewers.	
Michael McKillop	born 1990	An Irish middle distance paralympic runner with a mild form of cerebral palsy and epilepsy who has won Gold at the 2008, 2012 and 2016 Paralympic Games.	
Viktorija Senkutė	born 1996	Lithuanian rower, 2024 Olympic bronze medallist. At the age of 15 she was diagnosed with focal, or partial, epilepsy after she started experiencing convulsions during the night.	
Briar Nolet	born 1998	A Canadian dancer who competed in World of Dance and stars in The Next Step. After having a seizure during a dance rehearsal, she was misdiagnosed with anxiety, but two years later, a neurologist confirmed she has epilepsy.	
Mike Towell	1991–2016	A Scottish professional boxer from Dundee, Scotland. Who died after fight 'should have never been in the ring' after having epileptic seizures	
Justin Fields	born 1999	A first round pick in the 2021 NFL draft by the Chicago Bears. His condition was made public prior to the draft.	

=== Art and writing ===
Name	Life	Comments	Reference
Edward Lear	1812–1888	An artist, illustrator and writer known for his nonsensical poetry and limericks. His epilepsy, which he developed as a child, may have been inherited (his elder sister Jane had frequent seizures and died young). Lear was ashamed of his epilepsy and kept it a secret. He did, however, record each seizure in his diary.	
Fyodor Dostoyevsky	1821–1881	A Russian writer whose epilepsy was probably inherited (both his father and his son had seizures). He incorporated his experiences into his novels – creating four different characters with epilepsy. Dostoyevsky's epilepsy was unusual in that he claimed to experience an ecstatic aura prior to a seizure, whereas most people experience unpleasant feelings.	
George Inness	1825–1894	An American painter who had epilepsy from childhood.	
R. D. Blackmore	1825–1900	Author of Lorna Doone.	
Charles Altamont Doyle	1832–1893	Artist and father of Arthur Conan Doyle. His alcoholism and a violent outburst led him to be detained in an asylum. Whilst there, he developed epilepsy and severe memory problems.	
Bjørnstjerne Bjørnson	1832–1910	Norwegian writer and the 1903 Nobel Prize in Literature laureate. Developed focal epilepsy following a stroke in the final year of his life.	
Ion Creangă	1837–1889	A Romanian children's writer and memoirist who had epilepsy for the last six years of his life.	
Joaquim Maria Machado de Assis	1839–1908	A Brazilian realist novelist, poet and short-story writer. He had epilepsy all his life, but was ashamed to mention it, using euphemisms when writing to friends. It is believed he had complex partial seizures, with secondary generalisation.	
Dmitri Sinodi-Popov	1855–1910	A Russian artist, whose epilepsy interrupted his studies at the St. Petersburg Academy of Arts.	
Minakata Kumagusu	1867–1941	A Japanese writer and naturalist. He had tonic-clonic seizures, with an aura that caused déjà vu. Postmortem MRI showed right hippocampal atrophy, consistent with temporal lobe epilepsy.	
Vachel Lindsay	1879–1931	A poet who took phenobarbital for his epilepsy.	
Laurie Lee	1914–1997	A poet, novelist and screenwriter, best known for his autobiographical trilogy (which includes Cider with Rosie). His epilepsy probably developed after he was knocked down by a bicycle at the age of 10. He kept it secret and it only surfaced when his papers were read by biographers after his death.	
Kyffin Williams	1918–2006	A landscape painter. His epilepsy ended his army career and may have prevented him marrying.	
Max Clifford	1943–2017	A publicist known for representing controversial clients. He developed epilepsy at the age of 46.	
Karen Armstrong	born 1944	An author, feminist and writer on Judaism, Christianity, Islam and Buddhism. Her temporal lobe epilepsy went undiagnosed for many years. She wrote in her autobiography that when (in her early thirties) she was finally given the diagnosis, it was "an occasion of pure happiness".	
Thom Jones	born 1945	Author of short stories, many of which include characters with epilepsy.	
Stephen Knight	1951–1985	An author who was known for his books criticising the Freemasons. He started having seizures in 1977 and in 1980, agreed to take part in a BBC documentary TV program Horizon on epilepsy. The producers arranged for a brain scan, which showed up a tumour. This was removed but returned in 1984 and despite further surgery he died in 1985.	
DeBarra Mayo	born 1953	Fitness and health author and writer.	
Kathy Sierra	born 1957	A programming instructor and game developer who co-created the Head First series of books on computer programming. She had her first tonic-clonic seizure at the age of four. These were frequent and severe but greatly diminished by adulthood and were always preceded by an aura.	
Tamlik	1964–2024	An Australian-Aboriginal who painted using Western Desert Art style. He became diagnosed with epilepsy in 1984.	
Jago Eliot	1966–2006	Aristocrat, surfer and cyber artist. He died in his bath due to an epileptic seizure, which was recorded as a sudden unexpected death in epilepsy (SUDEP).	
Erica Wagner	1967	American author and critic who lives in London. Former literary editor of The Times and currently a writer with the New Statesman. She was diagnosed with epilepsy at the age of 12, and her book Seizure is a novella that features a family who deal with the issue of epilepsy.	
Rick O'Shea	born 1973	An Irish radio presenter on RTE 2FM since 2001 who was first diagnosed with epilepsy at the age of sixteen. He has been patron of Epilepsy Ireland since 2006.	
Reshma Valliappan	born 1980	An Indian artist-activist on a number of issues including sexuality, disability, mental health and human rights. Also known as Val Resh she has battled several conditions including Reye's Syndrome at a year and a half, schizophrenia and has scar epilepsy caused by meningioma in 2011 which though operated on recurred again in 2019.	
Andrea Werhun	born 1989	Canadian author and former sex worker. She was diagnosed after seeing a neurologist in 2019 following a series of seizures.	
Maisie Adam	born 1994	An English Stand-up comedian co-host of Big Kick Energy that focuses on the Soccer League and who took part in Soccer Aid 2023. She was diagnosed with Juvenile myoclonic epilepsy at the age of 14.	

=== Miscellaneous ===
Name	Life	Comments	Reference
Jean Clemens	1880–1909	The youngest daughter of Mark Twain. She had epilepsy from age fifteen, which her father attributed to a childhood head injury. Her epilepsy was not successfully controlled and at one point she was sent to an epilepsy colony in Katonah, New York. She was found dead on Christmas Eve in her bath aged 29. The cause of death was reported as drowning due to epilepsy.	
Derek Bentley	1933–1953	Hanged, aged 19, for a crime his partner committed, Bentley had epilepsy and a mental age of 11. He was pardoned after a 45-year campaign, which included the film Let Him Have It, starring Christopher Eccleston.	
Emilie Dionne	1934–1954	The third of the Dionne quintuplets, Emilie's epilepsy was only made public after her death at a convent in Sainte Agathe, Quebec. She died from complications caused by a series of epileptic seizures. These were recorded at noon the previous day, 11 pm, 3 am, and 5 am, but no doctor was called until after her death. Her death from epilepsy caused alarm, leading H. Houston Merritt to inform the public that "the mortality rate among epileptics is no greater than among non-sufferers".	
Virginia Ridley	1948–1997	A woman who had agoraphobia, hypergraphia and epilepsy. Her eccentric husband Alvin was charged with her murder but cleared after the jury accepted that she may have suffocated during a seizure. She had not been seen outside her home for 25 years.	
Don Craig Wiley	1944–2001	A protein-structure biochemist. He kept his epilepsy secret, did not treat it, and died under mysterious circumstances, possibly owing to a seizure.	
Rebecca Bace	born 1955	Developed epilepsy as a teenager. Most famously worked at the NSA where she created the Computer Misuse and Anomaly Detection (CMAD) Program and intrusion detection software at Los Alamos.	
Barry George	born 1960	Initially convicted but later acquitted of murdering the British television presenter Jill Dando. Has epilepsy, mental health problems and is autistic.	
Rick Harrison	born 1965	Co-owner of the Gold and Silver Pawn Shop in Las Vegas, Nevada and star of the History series Pawn Stars; had epilepsy when he was in his youth.	
Katie Hopkins	born 1975	English reality television contestant (The Apprentice, I'm a Celebrity...Get Me Out of Here!) and businesswoman, who developed epilepsy as a teenager	
Daniel Tammet	born 1979	An autistic savant who is a talented mnemonist and language learner. He had temporal lobe epilepsy as a child.	
Brad Jones	born 1981	During his review of Turkish Star Wars, the Cinema Snob mentions that he has been epileptic since 4th grade and takes Tegretol (carbamazepine).	
Keith Wallace	born 1969	During his interview on Philly Who, Keith revealed he been epileptic since a car crash that killed his fiancée and left him with severe injuries and in Baltimore, Maryland. He admitted to working as a winemaker in Napa Valley and Chianti for years without revealing his neurological disorder to his employers.	

== Retrospective diagnosis ==
The following people were not diagnosed with epilepsy during their lifetime. A retrospective diagnosis is speculative and, as detailed below, can be wrong.

Name	Life	Comments	Reference
Socrates	470–399 BC	Ancient Greek philosopher. It is speculated that his daimonion was a simple partial seizure and that he had temporal lobe epilepsy.	
Julius Caesar	100–44 BC	Roman military and political leader. There is documentation of symptoms experienced by Caesar beginning on his 50th birthday that some scholars believe were complex partial seizures. There is family history of epilepsy amongst his ancestors and descendants. The earliest accounts of these seizures were made by the biographer Suetonius who was born after Caesar's death. However, some scholars believe that Caesar's symptoms, as well as the deaths of his father and paternal grandfather, may be better explained by cardiovascular disease and stroke, and that the documentation of his epilepsy could be unreliable since certain symptoms were not described until after his death. Epilepsy was considered a "sacred disease" and therefore may have been publicized by family members after his death to portray a specific public image.	
Napoleon I of France	1769–1821	French military leader and emperor. A paper by William Osler in 1903 stated, "The slow pulse of Napoleon rests upon tradition; it has been suggested that his epilepsy and attacks of apathy may have been associated features in a chronic form of Stokes-Adams disease", which implies the seizures were not epileptic in origin. However, in 2003, John Hughes concluded that Napoleon had both psychogenic attacks due to stress and epileptic seizures due to chronic uremia from a severe urethral stricture caused by gonorrhea.	
Harriet Tubman	1822-1913	American abolitionist who rescued slaves with a network of antislavery activists collectively known as the Underground Railroad. A slave overseer threw a metal weight towards another slave but hit Tubman in the head instead. After this she experienced seizures along with painful headaches, fainting spells, and religious experiences. Temporal lobe epilepsy is considered one of the possible diagnoses.	
Franklin D. Roosevelt	1882-1945	The 32nd president of the United States. While an epilepsy diagnosis has not been officially confirmed, Roosevelt had symptoms consistent with complex partial seizures including staring blankly with his mouth hanging open and ceasing to speak in the middle of a sentence.	
George Gershwin	1898–1937	American composer. The first symptoms of his glioblastoma multiforme tumor were possibly olfactory-uncinate simple partial seizures. He noticed the smell of burnt rubber at the same time as dizziness or, occasionally, brief blackouts. His condition deteriorated and he died six months later, despite surgery to remove the tumor.	
Rosemary Kennedy	1918–2005	The younger sister of American President John F. Kennedy. She developed "convulsions" and violent fits around the age of 20. To her parents, it appeared to be a degenerating neurological disturbance or disease. The Kennedy family arranged a lobotomy to control her behaviour which reduced her mental capabilities to that of a toddler. A formal epilepsy diagnosis has never been disclosed.	

=== Religious figures ===
There is a long-standing notion that epilepsy and religion are linked, and it has been speculated that many religious figures had temporal lobe epilepsy. The temporal lobes generate the feeling of "I", and give a sense of familiarity or strangeness to the perceptions of the senses. The temporal lobes and adjacent anterior insular cortex seem to be involved in mystical experiences, and in the change in personality that may result from such experiences.

Raymond Bucke's Cosmic Consciousness (1901) contains several case-studies of people who have realized "cosmic consciousness". James Leuba's The psychology of religious mysticism noted that "among the dread diseases that afflict humanity there is only one that interests us quite particularly; that disease is epilepsy." Several of Bucke's cases are also mentioned in J.E. Bryant's 1953 book, Genius and Epilepsy, which has a list of more than 20 people that combines the great and the mystical.

Slater and Beard renewed the interest in TLE and religious experience in the 1960s. Dewhurst and Beard (1970) described six cases of TLE-patients who underwent sudden religious conversions. They placed these cases in the context of several western saints who had a sudden conversion, who were or may have been epileptic. Dewhurst and Beard described several aspects of conversion experiences, and did not favor one specific mechanism.

Norman Geschwind described behavioral changes related to temporal lobe epilepsy in the 1970s and 1980s. Now called Geschwind syndrome, he defined a cluster of specific personality characteristics often found in patients with temporal lobe epilepsy, which include increased religiosity. Evidence of Geschwind syndrome has been identified in some religious figures, in particular pronounced religiosity and hypergraphia (excessive writing). However, critics note that these characteristics can be the result of any illness, and are not sufficiently descriptive for patients with temporal lobe epilepsy.

Neuropsychiatrist Peter Fenwick, in the 1980s and 1990s, also found a relationship between the right temporal lobe and mystical experience, but also found that pathology or brain damage is only one of many possible causal mechanisms for these experiences. He questioned the earlier accounts of religious figures with temporal lobe epilepsy, noticing that "very few true examples of the ecstatic aura and the temporal lobe seizure had been reported in the world scientific literature prior to 1980". According to Fenwick, "It is likely that the earlier accounts of temporal lobe epilepsy and temporal lobe pathology and the relation to mystic and religious states owes more to the enthusiasm of their authors than to a true scientific understanding of the nature of temporal lobe functioning."

The occurrence of intense religious feelings in people with epilepsy in general is considered rare, with an incident rate of about 2–3%. Sudden religious conversion, together with visions, has been documented in only a small number of individuals with temporal lobe epilepsy. The occurrence of religious experiences in TLE-patients may as well be explained by religious attribution, due to the background of these patients. Nevertheless, the neurological research of mystical experiences is a growing field of research, searching for specific neurological explanations of mystical experiences. Study of ecstatic seizures may provide clues for the neurological mechanisms giving rise to mystical experiences, such as the anterior insular cortex, which is involved in self-awareness and subjective certainty.

People listed below are not necessarily known to have epilepsy nor indicate a scholarly consensus in favour of epilepsy; merely that such a diagnosis has been suggested.

Name	Life	Comments	Reference
The Priestly source of the Pentateuch	c700 BC	According to one researcher, the writing has a pedantic and aggressive style, shows extreme religiosity, verbosity and redundant style. These are said to be evidence of Geschwind syndrome, though there is no evidence of any seizures since we have no personal information regarding the author.	
Ezekiel	622BC–?	Fainting spells, periodic loss of speech, compulsive writing, extremely religious, pedantic speech.	
Paul of Tarsus	3–10 – 62–68	Epilepsy is one of many suggestions regarding his "thorn in the flesh". F.F. Bruce says, "Many guesses have been made about the identity of this "splinter in the flesh"; and their very variety proves the impossibility of a certain diagnosis. One favourite guess has been epilepsy ... but it is no more than a guess". Researchers disagree about the cause of his conversion and vision on the road to Damascus. In addition to a seizure, heat exhaustion, the voice of conscience together with a migraine, and even a bolt of lightning have been suggested.	
Saint Birgitta	1303–1373	Her skull shows evidence of a meningioma, which is a cause of epilepsy and may explain her visions. However, it is not in the temporal lobe and other researches suggest psychogenic non-epileptic seizures, or a combination.	
Joan of Arc	1412–1431	Experienced religious messages through voices and visions which she said others could sometimes experience simultaneously. Some researchers consider the visions to be ecstatic epileptic auras, though more recent research may implicate idiopathic partial epilepsy with auditory features. Epileptic seizures with clear auditory and visual hallucinations are very rare. This, together with the extreme length of her visions, lead some to reject epilepsy as a cause.	
Saint Catherine of Genoa	1447–1510	"[A]bnormal mental states" diagnosed as hysteria by Leuba; according to Dewhurst and Beard the symptoms may also suggest temporal lobe epilepsy. According to Dewhurst and Beard, Saint Catherine of Genoa, Saint Marguerite Marie and Mme Guyon "had periodic attacks which included the following symptoms: sensations of extremes of heat and cold, trembling of the whole body, transient aphasia, automatisms, passivity feelings, hyperaesthesiae, childish regression, dissociation, somnambulism, transient paresis, increased suggestibility, and an inability to open the eyes."	
Saint Teresa of Ávila	1515–1582	Visions, chronic headaches, transient loss of consciousness and also a four-day coma.	
Saint Catherine of Ricci	1522–1590	Visual hallucinations. Loss of consciousness for 28 hours.	
Saint Marguerite Marie	1647–1690	"[A]bnormal mental states" diagnosed as hysteria by Leuba; according to Dewhurst and Beard the symptoms may also suggest temporal lobe epilepsy. According to Dewhurst and Beard, Saint Catherine of Genoa, Saint Marguerite Marie and Mme Guyon "had periodic attacks which included the following symptoms: sensations of extremes of heat and cold, trembling of the whole body, transient aphasia, automatisms, passivity feelings, hyperaesthesiae, childish regression, dissociation, somnambulism, transient paresis, increased suggestibility, and an inability to open the eyes."	
Mme Guyon	1648–1717	"[A]bnormal mental states" diagnosed as hysteria by Leuba; according to Dewhurst and Beard the symptoms may also suggest temporal lobe epilepsy. According to Dewhurst and Beard, Saint Catherine of Genoa, Saint Marguerite Marie and Mme Guyon "had periodic attacks which included the following symptoms: sensations of extremes of heat and cold, trembling of the whole body, transient aphasia, automatisms, passivity feelings, hyperaesthesiae, childish regression, dissociation, somnambulism, transient paresis, increased suggestibility, and an inability to open the eyes."	
Emanuel Swedenborg	1688–1772	Swedish scientist, philosopher, seer, and theologian.	
Joseph Smith	1805–1844	Seized with a strange power, rendered speechless, and fell on his back. Visions of darkness and light.	
Ellen G. White	1827–1915	Severe head injury followed by three weeks of limited consciousness. Her visions involved loss of consciousness, upward eye deflection, visual hallucinations, affective changes, gestural automatisms, preservation of speech, a post-ictal-like period. Further, she meets several criteria for the Geschwind syndrome: extreme religiosity, hypergraphia (100,000 pages in 4,000 articles), repetitiveness, hypermoralism, and hyposexuality.	
Ramakrishna	1836–1886	Bengali mystic, highly influential in the development of Hindu Universalism and Neo-Vedanta, through his disciple Swami Vivekananda, who held that religious experience was a valid method of gaining knowledge. From the age of six onwards, he had ecstatic trances. From his 10th or 11th year on, the trances became common, and by the final years of his life, Ramakrishna's samādhi periods occurred almost daily. Early on, these experiences have been interpreted as epileptic seizures, an interpretation which was rejected by Ramakrishna himself.	
Saint Thérèse de Lisieux	1873–1897	Seized with "strange and violent tremblings all over her body". Visual hallucinations and celestial visions.	
Ramana Maharshi	1879–1950	At age 16, Ramana was seized by a sudden fear of death. He was struck by "a flash of excitement" or "heat", which he characterized as some avesam, a "spirit", "current" or "force" that seemed to possess him. After this event, he lost his interest in the usual life-routines, and immersed himself in emotional worship of Shiva and of Tamil saints. He left home, to live at the holy mountain Arunachala for the rest of his life, where he was worshipped as an avatar, due to his prolonged trance. In 1912, a major fit took place, accompanied with various sensations as a "white shield" over part of his vision, and "swimming in the head", and in which he lost consciousness. Ramana later stated that these fits appeared occasionally.	
Pio of Pietrelcina	1887–1968	Had visions at an early age about God, Jesus and the Virgin Mary.	
Jiddu Krishnamurti	1895–1986	Spiritual teacher, raised by Theosophians to become 'the world teacher.' In his 20s, he underwent an episode of severe pain in the neck accompanied by mystical experiences. Throughout his life "the process" occurred, accompanied by the presence of "the otherness". Sloss, daughter of Krishnamurti's long-term mistress, considered the process to be a purely physical event centred on sickness or trauma, and suggested the possibility of Temporal Lobe Epilepsy.	

== Misdiagnosis ==
Many famous people are incorrectly recorded as having epilepsy. In some cases there is no evidence at all to justify a diagnosis of epilepsy. In others, the symptoms have been misinterpreted. In some, the seizures were provoked by other causes, such as acute illness or alcohol withdrawal.

=== No evidence ===
The following people are often reported to have had epilepsy but there is no evidence that they had any attacks or illnesses that even resembled epilepsy.

Name	Life	Comments	Reference
Cambyses II	?–521 BC	Herodotus, writing eighty years after the king's death, is responsible for repeating what are now regarded as slanderous remarks that Cambyses was mad and had epilepsy.	
Pythagoras	582–507 BC		
Aristotle	384–322 BC		
Hannibal	247–183 BC	Carthaginian military leader.	
Hermann von Helmholtz	1821–1894		
Agatha Christie	1890–1976		

=== Misdiagnosis by association ===
Many individuals have been mistakenly recorded as having epilepsy due to an association with someone (real or fictional) who did have epilepsy, or something similar.

Name	Life	Comments	Reference
Dante Alighieri	1265–1321	In his fictional La Divina Commedia, he falls into a "dead faint".	
Isaac Newton	1643–1727	In 2000, a paper was published comparing Newton's psychosis with that of a patient with psychosis, who additionally happened to have generalised tonic-clonic seizures. It is possible that ambiguities in the introduction to this paper led readers to associate the epilepsy with Newton rather than the patient.	
Ludwig van Beethoven	1770–1827	His acquaintance Antonie Brentano had a son, Karl Joseph, who had epilepsy.	
Alfred, Lord Tennyson	1809–1892	Close family had epilepsy and mental illness, which led Tennyson to fear this in himself.	
William Morris	1834–1896	His daughter, May, had epilepsy and this caused Morris to question if his temper rages were related to this.	
Patrick Dempsey	born 1966	Played a boy with epilepsy in the 1986 Disney TV movie A Fighting Choice. He won an award from the Epilepsy Foundation for his convincing portrayal.	

=== Provoked seizures ===
The following people may have had one or more epileptic seizures but since the seizures were provoked, they do not result in a diagnosis of epilepsy:

Name	Life	Comments	Reference
Edgar Allan Poe	1809–1849	Multiple scholars have suggested Poe may have had focal seizures with impaired awareness, a condition which is reflected in multiple of his characters. This suggests a temporal lobe epilepsy potentially caused by life-long alcohol and drug abuse. It is unknown if Poe ever had a generalized tonic-clonic seizure, and the seizures he had may have been provoked by alcohol withdrawal.	
Leo Tolstoy	1828–1910	"Fits of spleen" and anguish attacks. Had seizures while dying of pneumonia.	
Algernon Charles Swinburne	1837–1909	Alcohol withdrawal attacks.	
Lewis Carroll	1832–1898	Migraine and a possible seizure that was probably due to the effects of drug withdrawal.	
Alfred Nobel	1833–1896	Febrile seizures in infancy.	
Pyotr Ilyich Tchaikovsky	1840–1893	Seizures in the hours before death. Possible family history of epilepsy.	
Truman Capote	1924–1984	Alcohol withdrawal seizures.	
Richard Burton	1925–1984	Alcohol withdrawal seizures.	
Elton John	born 1947	Drug- and alcohol-induced seizures	

=== Similar conditions ===
There are many conditions that produce paroxysmal attacks or events. These events (especially in historical, non-medical literature such as biographies) are often called fits, seizures or convulsions. Those terms do not exclusively apply to epilepsy and such events are sometimes categorised as non-epileptic seizures. When studied in detail, the attacks were more fully described as "fits of spleen", "seized by pain", "convulsed with anguish", etc.

Name	Life	Comments	Reference
Alexander the Great	356–323 BC	Collapsed after taking strong medicine for pneumonia.	
Charles the Fat	c.839–888	Commonly regarded as a sickly king who had epilepsy, who had a "fit" in Frankfurt in 873. One author's recent detailed investigations cast doubt on the accuracy of certain reports, or their common interpretation. Instead, headache, malaria and a stroke are suggested.	
Alfred the Great	849–899	Acute pain.	
Leonardo da Vinci	1452–1519	Nervous shaking and spasms when furious.	
Michelangelo	1475–1564	A faint due to working in very hot weather.	
Martin Luther	1483–1546	In John Osborne's play Luther, his visions are the result of epileptic seizures. Luther had many documented illnesses, but any recurrent attacks were probably due to Ménière's disease.	
Cardinal Richelieu	1585–1642	Bouts of tears.	
Louis XIII of France	1601–1643	Episodes of violence, moodiness and fearfulness.	
Molière	1622–1673	A coughing fit.	
Blaise Pascal	1623–1662	Breath-holding spells as a child.	
William III of England	1650–1702	Fainting and coughing fits.	
Jonathan Swift	1667–1745	Severe fits of giddiness due to Ménière's disease.	
George Frideric Handel	1685–1759	A stroke.	
William Pitt the Elder	1708–1778	Attacks of gout.	
Samuel Johnson	1709–1784	Tourette syndrome.	
Jean-Jacques Rousseau	1712–1778	Dizzy fits and agitation.	
James Madison	1751–1836	Psychogenic non-epileptic seizures.	
Walter Scott	1771–1832	Seizures of cramp due to kidney stones and, later, a stroke.	
Niccolò Paganini	1784–1840	Repeated collapsing due to weakness.	
Lord Byron	1788–1824	Psychogenic non-epileptic seizures.	
Percy Bysshe Shelley	1792–1822	Fits of pain and nervous attacks.	
Hector Berlioz	1803–1869	"Fits of spleen".	
Robert Schumann	1810–1856	Depression and hallucinations.	
Charles Dickens	1812–1870	Renal colic.	
Søren Kierkegaard	1813–1855	Collapsing due to weakness.	
Gustave Flaubert	1821–1880	In 1984, Henri Gastaut proposed a very specific retrospective diagnosis of a particular form of complex partial epilepsy. More recent biographical information led John Hughes, in 2005, to conclude that Flaubert had psychogenic non-epileptic seizures, and migraine.	
Guy de Maupassant	1850–1893	Mental illness and hallucinations caused by inhaling ether.	
Vincent van Gogh	1853–1890	Over 150 physicians have produced nearly 30 different diagnoses for van Gogh's illness. Henri Gastaut's posthumous diagnosis was "temporal lobe epilepsy precipitated by the use of absinthe in the presence of an early limbic lesion". This agrees with that of van Gogh's own doctor, Felix Rey, who prescribed potassium bromide. That van Gogh's personality closely matches the Geschwind syndrome is seen as further evidence by some. Not everyone agrees – a recent review by John Hughes concluded that van Gogh did not have epilepsy. He certainly was mentally ill at times and had "fainting fits" after heavy drinking.	
Graham Greene	1904–1991	Greene was diagnosed with epilepsy as a young man, after several incidents during which he lost consciousness. His impending marriage was at risk and he considered suicide. Treatment consisted of good walks and Kepler's Malt Extract. Greene eventually distrusted the diagnosis and it is now considered likely that the episodes were fainting spells.	
John Berryman	1914–1972	Diagnosed with petit mal epilepsy, now estimated to have been nervous exhaustion. Berryman had depression and alcoholism.	

== Sources ==
- Bhawuk, Dharm P.S. (February 2003). "Culture's influence on creativity: the case of Indian spirituality". International Journal of Intercultural Relations. 27 (1). Elsevier: 8. doi:10.1016/S0147-1767(02)00059-7.
- Katrak, Sarosh M (2006), "An eulogy for Prof. Anil D. Desai", Annals of Indian Academy of Neurology, 9 (4): 253, doi:10.4103/0972-2327.29215, S2CID 70463133
- Zaleski, Philip (2006). "The Ecstatic". Prayer: A History. Mariner Books.
