= Leuba =

Leuba may refer to:

== Geography ==
- Leuba (Ostritz), a district of Ostritz
- Leuba (river), a river in Thuringia

== People with the surname ==
- James H. Leuba (1867–1946), American psychologist
- Jean-François Leuba (1934–2004), Swiss lawyer and jurist

== See also ==
- Gottleuba
