= Ecstatic seizures =

Rare form of epilepsy causing ecstatic and mystical experiences

- Other names: Ecstatic epileptic seizures; Ecstatic convulsions; Ecstatic epilepsy; Ecstatic auras; Epilepsy with ecstatic seizures; Dostoevsky epilepsy; Dostoevsky's epilepsy
- Specialty: Neurology
- Symptoms: Auras with intense positive affect, physical well-being, heightened awareness, feelings of certainty, altered sense of time, seizures, others
- Duration: A few seconds to 2–3 minutes
- Causes: Epilepsy
- Frequency: Rare

Ecstatic seizures, also known as ecstatic epilepsy or as Dostoevsky's epilepsy, are a rare type of epilepsy that involve seizures with an intensely blissful, euphoric, or ecstatic aura. They are a form of focal epilepsy. Symptoms include intense positive affect, physical well-being, and heightened awareness, as well as time dilation and other symptoms. They are often described as mystical, spiritual, and/or religious, and have sometimes been said to be "life-changing".

Ecstatic seizures are thought to be caused by epileptic activation of an area of the brain known as the dorsal anterior insula. Electrical stimulation of this part of the brain can induce ecstatic seizures. It has been theorized that ecstatic seizures caused by activation of the insula may be due to a temporary block of prediction errors associated with uncertainty and negative affect. Conceptual and neurological parallels have been drawn between ecstatic seizures and other intensely positive or mystical experiences, for instance with drugs like MDMA ("ecstasy") and psychedelics, as well as with moving musical enjoyment and deep states of meditation.

The Russian novelist Fyodor Dostoevsky, who himself had epilepsy and ecstatic seizures, first described these seizures in his writings in the mid-to-late 1800s. The first cases of ecstatic seizures reported in the medical literature were published in the late 1800s and early 1900s. As of 2023, around 50 cases of ecstatic seizures have been reported. The involvement of the anterior insula in ecstatic seizures was first elucidated in 2009, and ecstatic experiences were first artificially induced by stimulation of this brain area in 2013. Some leading historical religious figures, such as Saint Paul the Apostle and Joan of Arc, have been suspected as having had ecstatic seizures.

== Symptoms ==
The symptoms variably include feelings of increased self-awareness, mental clarity, certainty, feelings of "unity with everything that exists" (including the external environment), intense positive affect, a sense of intense serenity or bliss, mystical, spiritual, or religious experiences, physical well-being, a sense of "hyper-reality", and time dilation, among others. The term "oceanic" has also been invoked in describing the experiences. The physical well-being includes a feeling of warmth ascending from the feet to the head or a feeling of the body being covered in velvet.

The key and essential definitional criteria of ecstatic seizures include:

1. "Intense positive emotion (bliss)"
2. "Enhanced physical well-being"
3. "Heightened self-awareness or heightened perception of the external world (clarity)"

The state seems to primarily involve an absence of doubts or uncertainty rather than a primary intense positive emotion. Ecstatic seizures have been compared to the bliss of enjoying music or orgasm and have been described as much better than sex. They have also been described as life-changing, for instance resulting in people no longer fearing death or converting from atheism to religion. Alternating ecstatic and unpleasant emotions, such as anxiety, have also been reported however.

A description of Russian novelist Fyodor Dostoevsky's ecstatic auras by his close friend Nikolay Strakhov was published as follows:

For several brief moments, I feel a contentedness which is unthinkable under normal conditions and unimaginable for those who have not experienced it. At such times, I am in perfect harmony with myself and with the entire universe. Perception is so clear and so agreeable that one would give 10 years of his life, and perhaps all of it, for a few seconds of such bliss.

Epileptic auras, generally speaking, last from a few seconds up to usually 20 to 30 seconds but to a maximum of about 2 to 3 minutes. Thereafter, the seizure may or may not evolve into loss of consciousness and a generalized tonic–clonic seizure. In contrast to the auras in ecstatic seizures, most auras of seizures generally are unpleasant, including feelings of anxiety and fear (60%) as well as depression, while positive feelings are only rarely reported.

There are some similarities and overlap of ecstatic epilepsy with Geschwind syndrome (occurs in about 7% of cases of temporal lobe epilepsy), orgasmic epilepsy, and certain other forms of epilepsy.

People with ecstatic or pleasant seizures often have a strong wish to prevent the auras from ending and have been known to try to prolong them. In one case, a patient initially refused surgical resection of a brain tumor causing the seizures. Noncompliance with anticonvulsant medication is common. Others have admitted to lowering their medication doses in an attempt to achieve a level that could allow for ecstatic auras without seizures. This is a difficult balance to strike however and has often not been successful. There have been cases of epileptic individuals willingly self-inducing ecstatic or pleasurable seizures via exposure to known provoking epileptogenic stimuli, like flickering or flashing television screens. Positive emotions have been reported to be a trigger of ecstatic seizures in some.

== Causes ==
Brain regions associated with ecstatic seizures. The epileptogenic zone (left, orange) is most frequently located in the temporal lobe, whereas the symptomatogenic zone (right, green) predominantly involves the dorsal anterior insula. Circled numbers indicate patient counts for the anatomical localizations identified in a 2026 systematic review.

The primary brain area thought to be involved in the generation of ecstatic seizures is the dorsal anterior insula. It is thought that the ecstatic feelings result from ictal hyperactivation of the anterior insular cortex. The epilepsy is often caused by epileptogenic brain tumors.

Brain imaging studies support activation of the anterior insula in ecstatic seizures. Additionally, several instances of reproducible ecstatic-like seizures have been induced during presurgical evaluation with electrical brain stimulation to the dorsal anterior insula. Intense time dilation has also been produced by stimulation of the right mid-dorsal insular region. Stimulation of a variety of other brain areas, including the inferior temporal gyrus, temporal pole, left amygdala, inferior frontal gyrus, anterior cingulate cortex, and supplementary motor area, have also been reported to produce euphoric or pleasant feelings. However, ecstasy-like experiences have not been specifically described with these other areas. Stimulation of the right amygdala and the hippocampus have been associated with very unpleasant emotions. It is thought that vast activation of the anterior insula is needed for generation of ecstatic seizures, which may underlie the few cases that have been observed with electrical brain stimulation. In a 2026 systematic review, analysis of the symptomatogenic zone in nine patients identified right-sided cortical localizations in five, left-sided localizations in three, and bilateral localizations in one. The authors reported a slight tendency toward right-hemisphere involvement, which they described as not statistically significant.

The theory of predictive coding posits that the brain is a prediction machine, is constantly modeling its environment and updating this model, and tries to minimize prediction errors (the mismatch between the predictions/model and the actual environment) and uncertainty to avoid surprise and to minimize energy expenditure. Prediction errors are often experienced as aversive and threatening and can produce feelings of uncertainty and discomfort. It has been theorized that ecstatic seizures, including feelings of certainty, clarity, trust, well-being, serenity, and inner peace, may be due to a temporary blockade of interoceptive prediction error generation and associated negative emotions. This in turn results in an acute "ultimate stable state", with no ambiguity or "perfect prediction of the world", and associated positive feelings. A natural or physiological (but much less intense) analogue could be considered "aha!" or "eureka!" moments—that is, sudden understanding of a previously incomprehensible problem and associated joy, elation, and satisfaction—for instance discovering the cause of a difficult software bug in computer code. The heightened awareness and time dilation in ecstatic seizures have been hypothesized to be related to the strongly salient nature of the experiences.

There is an especially high density of nicotinic acetylcholine receptors in the dorsal anterior insula. This has raised questions about the role of acetylcholine in predictive and emotional processing and in the experience of ecstatic seizures.

Ecstatic seizures have been compared to the subjective experiences of psychoactive drugs, such as psychostimulant euphoriants and entactogens, like amphetamines, cocaine, and methylenedioxymethamphetamine (MDMA; "ecstasy"), as well as psychedelic hallucinogens, like ayahuasca (dimethyltryptamine), psilocybe mushrooms (psilocybin), and peyote (mescaline). The states produced by these drugs can show similarities to the blissful experiences of ecstatic seizures. As an example, Alexander Shulgin, who discovered the subjective effects of MDMA, described an experience with the drug as follows: "I feel absolutely clean inside, and there is nothing but pure euphoria. I have never felt so great or believed this to be possible. I am overcome by the profundity of the experience." Activation of the anterior insula may cause the positive affect of these various drugs, similarly to ecstatic seizures. However, the experience of ecstatic seizures has been anecdotally described by some as beyond that which could be achieved with any drug.

The causes of ecstatic seizures may also overlap with other non-epileptic and non-pharmacological ecstatic or mystical experiences. The insula has been found to be activated by maternal and romantic love, as well as by pleasant and mesmerizing musical moments and deeper states of meditation. Besides the insula, the dopamine reward system of the ventral tegmental area and striatum or nucleus accumbens have also been found to be activated by musical moments. There are many parallels between ecstatic auras and deeper states of meditation. Greater activation of the dorsal anterior insula has been found in advanced meditators (>10,000 hours of practice) and with greater self-reported intensity of meditation. More gray matter, a thicker cortex, and greater gyrification of the anterior insula have been found in meditators compared to non-mediators. In addition, more years of meditation is positively correlated with gyrification of the anterior insula. Some people have also been known to have spontaneous and naturally occurring ecstatic and/or mystical experiences similar to those of ecstatic auras, often as single episodes in their lives, that are of non-epileptogenic origin and are outside of a meditative or religious context. These have been referred to as "awakening experiences".

The state in ecstatic seizures is in notable contrast to various neuropsychiatric disorders, like anxiety disorders, depression, and obsessive–compulsive disorder (OCD), in which there is intolerance of uncertainty and ambiguous situations, abnormally increased anticipation of aversive stimuli, subjective feelings of doubt (as opposed to certainty), and/or accompanying avoidance behavior. Some of these conditions have been associated with increased activity of the dorsal anterior insula. Ecstatic seizures may provide insight into the understanding and treatment of neuropsychiatric disorders. The dorsal anterior insula has been proposed as a potential novel therapeutic target for treatment of neuropsychiatric disorders like severe depression, for instance through non-invasive intermittent brain stimulation techniques. This could be an alternative to the novel field of psychedelics for these conditions, under the assumption that transient mystical experiences could result in long-lasting therapeutic psychological benefits.

== Experimental induction ==
Ecstatic experiences have been induced experimentally through direct electrical stimulation of the dorsal anterior insula in patients undergoing presurgical evaluation for drug-resistant focal epilepsy. These investigations provide evidence that activation of the insular cortex can generate ecstatic symptoms, although the experiences have not been consistently reproduced across patients.

=== Intracranial electrical stimulation ===
The involvement of the anterior insula was initially proposed on the basis of clinical observations, electroencephalography and functional neuroimaging. In 2009, Picard and Craig described five patients with ecstatic seizures, including one in whom ictal SPECT showed increased blood flow predominantly in the right anterior insula. This study supported the proposed involvement of the region but did not experimentally induce ecstatic experiences.

In 2013, Picard, Scavarda and Bartolomei reported the first experimental induction of a habitual ecstatic aura through direct electrical stimulation of the dorsal anterior insula. The patient was a 23-year-old woman with drug-resistant focal epilepsy and recurrent ecstatic auras. During stereoelectroencephalography (SEEG), stimulation of contacts in the right dorsal anterior insula repeatedly reproduced her habitual sensations of bliss and floating. Stimulation of other sampled regions did not elicit the same experience, and no epileptiform afterdischarges were observed following successful stimulation.

In 2019, Bartolomei and colleagues investigated three patients in whom electrical stimulation of the dorsal anterior insula had reproduced ecstatic sensations. One patient had been described in the 2013 report. The study used intracranial EEG recordings and functional connectivity analysis to compare neural activity immediately before and after stimulation. Increased connectivity was observed between several brain regions, with the dorsal anterior insula identified as the most common leading region according to directed connectivity measures. The findings suggested that the ecstatic phenomenon involved a broader neural network rather than the stimulated region alone.

In 2022, Nencha and colleagues reported the induction of an ecstatic experience in a 51-year-old man undergoing invasive monitoring for drug-resistant temporal lobe epilepsy who had no history of ecstatic auras. Stimulation of the left dorsal anterior insula repeatedly produced mental clarity, bliss, expanded awareness and a sense of interconnectedness. The experience was reproduced three times without detectable epileptiform afterdischarges. Stimulation of neighboring contacts and other sampled regions did not reproduce the same symptoms. The patient subsequently completed the Mystical Experience Questionnaire (MEQ-30), scoring 130 out of 150 points and meeting the questionnaire's criteria for a complete mystical experience.

=== Experimental methodology and reproducibility ===
The intracranial stimulation experiments were conducted during clinical epilepsy evaluations using surgically implanted SEEG electrodes. Electrode placement was determined by each patient's presurgical diagnostic requirements, with anatomical localization established through neuroimaging. Electrical stimulation was delivered through selected intracerebral electrode contacts while electrophysiological activity and subjective responses were monitored. The published studies documented stimulation characteristics, anatomical localization, patient responses and the presence or absence of epileptiform afterdischarges.

The findings have several limitations. The 2019 study selected patients who had already exhibited ecstatic symptoms during intracranial stimulation, preventing estimation of the probability of inducing such experiences in an unselected population. In the 2022 report, the authors additionally noted that comparable stimulation of the dorsal anterior insula had failed to induce ecstatic experiences in five other patients with drug-resistant epilepsy. Furthermore, the absence of detectable afterdischarges does not exclude the involvement of connected brain regions in generating the experience.

A systematic review published in 2026 examined 33 studies containing 51 reported patients. The analysis of the epileptogenic zone was restricted to nine patients meeting high or very high confidence criteria for localization, of whom six had epileptogenic regions in the temporal lobe. A separate analysis of the symptomatogenic zone, also involving nine patients, identified 14 sublobar localizations, nine of which involved the dorsal anterior insula. These results supported a distinction between regions responsible for seizure initiation and those involved in producing ecstatic symptoms. The authors emphasized the small number of eligible patients, substantial risk of bias and heterogeneity of the available evidence.

=== Reflex and self-induced ecstatic seizures ===
Some patients experiencing ecstatic or other pleasurable epileptic seizures have reported the ability to precipitate their own seizures. In a 2003 clinical series of 11 consecutive patients with ecstatic or pleasurable ictal symptoms, Asheim Hansen and Brodtkorb found that eight patients wished to experience their seizures, five reported the ability to induce them voluntarily, and four exhibited nonadherence to antiseizure treatment.

Reported precipitants include recollection of previous seizures, specific memories and positive emotional contexts. These observations have been interpreted as suggesting a reflex component to some ecstatic seizures, in which activation of susceptible neural networks can precipitate epileptic discharges.

Ecstatic experiences have also been reported in association with photosensitive epilepsy, including television-induced seizures. Such cases have been discussed alongside pleasurable self-induced absence seizures in generalized epilepsy, which are distinct from focal ecstatic seizures.

== History ==
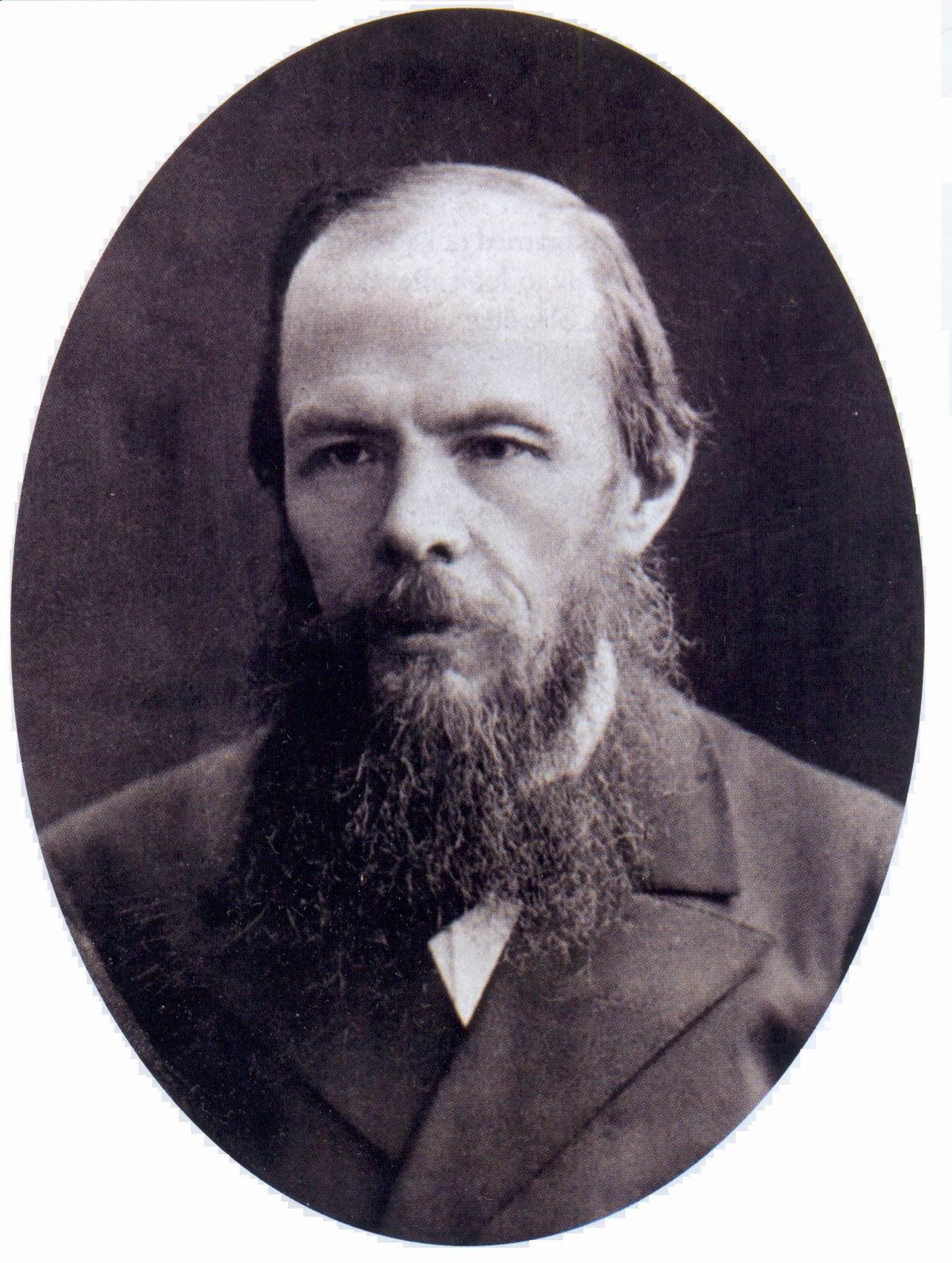
Fyodor Dostoevsky (1821–1881; photo in 1879).

The first description of ecstatic seizures in the literature was by the 19th-century Russian novelist Fyodor Dostoevsky. He had epilepsy and described his own ecstatic seizures in his writings, such as The Idiot (1869) and The Demons (1872). The first cases of ecstatic seizures in the medical literature were briefly described by William P. Spratling and others in the late 1800s and early 1900s. Subsequently, a series of additional case reports were published in the 1950s and thereafter. The term "ecstatic seizures" was coined by psychologist James H. Leuba. Greater awareness of ecstatic epilepsy began with a paper discussing Dostoevsky's epilepsy by French neurologist Henri Gastaut in 1978.

The existence of ecstatic seizures, including those of Dostoevsky, was initially denied by some well-known epileptologists, such as Gastaut and others. This has been attributed to limited documentation of the seizures, which is in turn related to the fact that people with the auras are often reluctant to talk about the experiences and refrain from communicating them. This is due to the ineffability of the experiences or inability to convey them in words, their extremely abnormal nature (termed "hallucination of emotion"), and fears of being seen as being mentally deranged or as having psychiatric disorders. The ability to communicate the subjective experience of ecstatic auras is also highly dependent on a person's intelligence, power of introspection, and vocabulary.

By 2016, 52 cases of ecstatic epilepsy had been reported in the medical literature. They have usually been reported as single cases. In-depth characterizations of the experiences of such patients have been published. It is thought that the incidence of ecstatic seizures is greatly underestimated, in part due to the reluctance of people to talk about them. It is known that approximately 1% of people with temporal lobe epilepsy report religious or spiritual experiences associated with their epilepsy, though these are distinct from ecstatic seizures.

Ecstatic seizures have been especially studied, reviewed, and brought greater attention to by Swiss neuroscientist Fabienne Picard and her colleagues beginning in 2009 and continuing to the present. The involvement of the dorsal anterior insula in ecstatic seizures was elucidated by her team in 2009 and thereafter. Cases of electrical brain stimulation inducing the experiences were published in 2013, 2019, and 2022. There have also been unpublished cases, for a total of six or seven cases (both with and without ecstatic epilepsy) as of 2023.

== Society and culture ==
=== Notable individuals ===
The 19th-century Russian novelist Fyodor Dostoevsky had epilepsy and experienced ecstatic seizures. Ecstatic seizures have often been referred to as "Dostoevsky's epilepsy" as he was the first and among the most notable documented cases of the condition. Dostoevsky had an average of about one seizure a month from age 20 or 25 years until his death at 59 years of age, which would be a total of around 400 to 500 seizures in his lifetime.

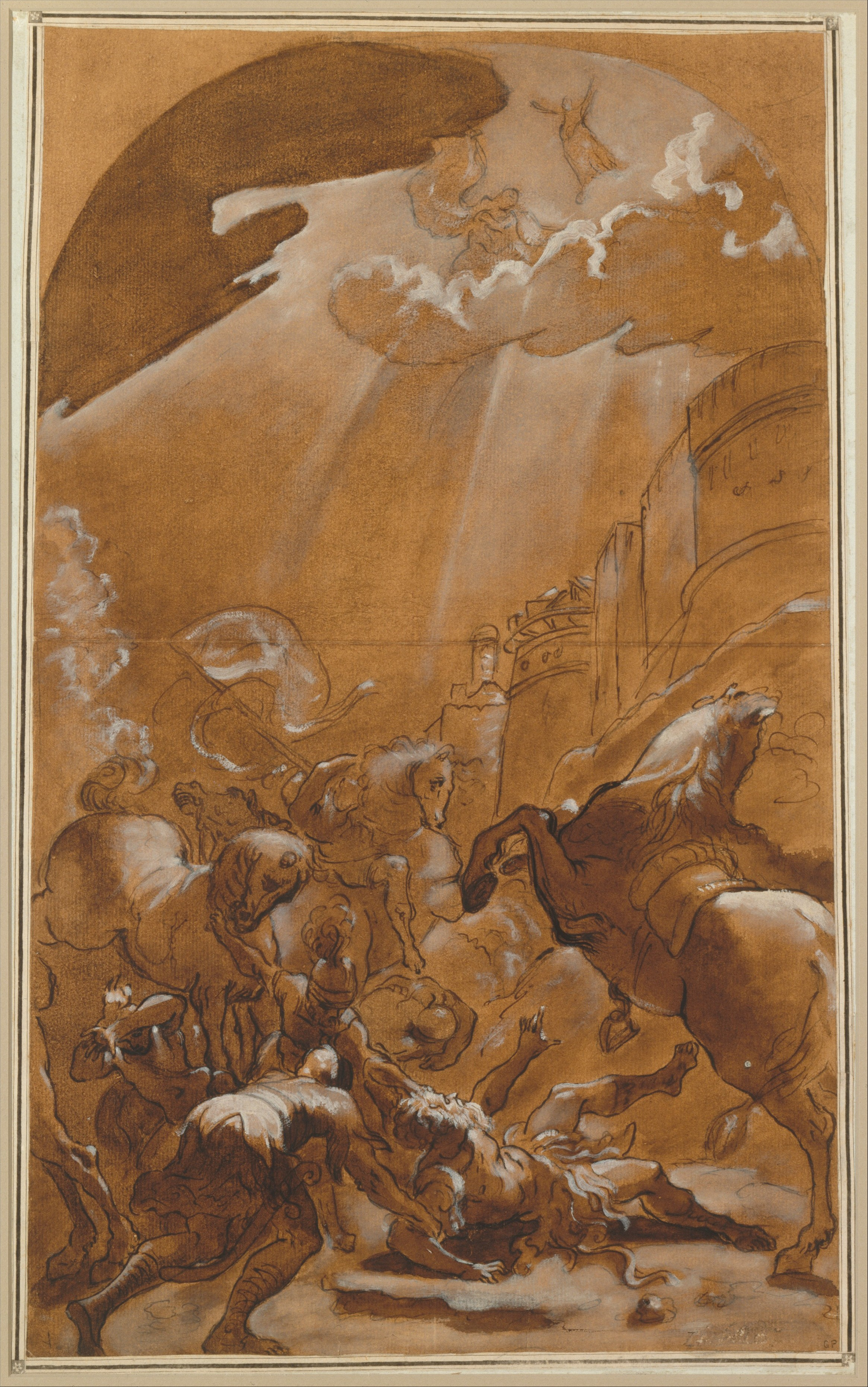
This depiction illustrates the biblical account of Paul’s vision on the road to Damascus, an event that some scholars have suggested may share features with ecstatic seizures, including those associated with temporal lobe epilepsy. The image has been referenced in discussions exploring possible neurological interpretations of religious experiences.

Some researchers have proposed that ecstatic epilepsy may be linked to the experiences of several prominent religious figures throughout history. These hypotheses suggest that certain spiritual or mystical episodes described in historical texts might share characteristics with neurological conditions such as temporal lobe epilepsy. One frequently discussed figure in this context is Saint Paul the Apostle, whose reported visions and dramatic religious conversion have been examined through both theological and neurological lenses.

According to the Acts of the Apostles, Paul’s transformative experience occurred on the road to Damascus. This path has been interpreted as a profound inner event that reshaped his understanding and purpose. According to one reflection, such experiences may be understood as “epiphanies of the heart” that invite inward change and deeper spiritual awareness. The account describes a sudden flash of light, a voice from heaven, temporary blindness, and several days of fasting and prayer. While traditionally interpreted as a divine encounter, some modern scholars have noted similarities between this episode and symptoms associated with ecstatic seizures, such as visual and auditory hallucinations, transient loss of consciousness, and subsequent behavioral change.

Additional insight into Paul's experiences appears in 2 Corinthians 12:2–10, where he refers to being "caught up to the third heaven," an experience he describes as ineffable and spiritually significant. He also alludes to a "thorn in the flesh," a persistent physical or psychological affliction. Though its nature remains uncertain, various interpretations have been proposed, including chronic illness, mental health conditions, and neurological disorders such as epilepsy. These interpretations remain speculative and are debated among scholars.

The theory that Paul's mystical experiences may have had a neurological component is not intended to diminish their spiritual impact but to explore possible biological correlates of religious phenomena. Researchers in this field have suggested that certain altered states of consciousness may arise from temporal lobe activity, providing a neurological framework for understanding religious visions and experiences.

Saint Paul is not the only historical figure associated with such interpretations. Saint Teresa of Ávila, a 16th-century Spanish Carmelite mystic, described intense episodes of spiritual ecstasy in her writings, including visions and a profound sense of divine union. One of the most well-known representations of her experience is Gian Lorenzo Bernini’s sculpture The Ecstasy of Saint Teresa, located in Rome’s Cornaro Chapel. The sculpture captures the dramatic moment she described in her autobiography, where she felt her soul pierced by a divine force, resulting in overwhelming joy and physical stillness. While traditionally viewed through a theological lens, some modern scholars have drawn comparisons between such experiences and dissociative or seizure-like states, suggesting possible neurological components to her ecstatic visions.

Joan of Arc, who claimed to hear divine voices and see visions beginning in adolescence, has similarly been the subject of retrospective medical hypotheses, including epilepsy and neuropsychiatric conditions. While these interpretations are speculative and not universally accepted, they illustrate the ongoing interest in the potential intersection of neurology and spirituality.

Another figure mentioned in this context is Ramana Maharshi, a 20th-century Indian sage whose spiritual awakening reportedly began with an intense fear of death followed by a shift in consciousness. Though not involving convulsions or overt motor symptoms, his experience has been likened by some commentators to altered brain states described in neurological and meditative literature.

These interpretations remain controversial and are part of broader interdisciplinary discussions among theologians, historians, and neuroscientists. While traditional religious narratives emphasize the divine origin of such experiences, some modern analyses consider possible physiological or psychological explanations, contributing to a more complex understanding of religious ecstasy across cultures.

=== Popular media ===
A character in the James Cameron film Avatar: The Way of Water (2022), named Kiri, experiences an epileptic seizure that results in "religious ecstasy". The titular character in the 2019 film Saint Maud is shown to have a similar, chronic condition.
