= Ecstasy (emotion) =

Subjective experience of total involvement of subject with object of their awareness

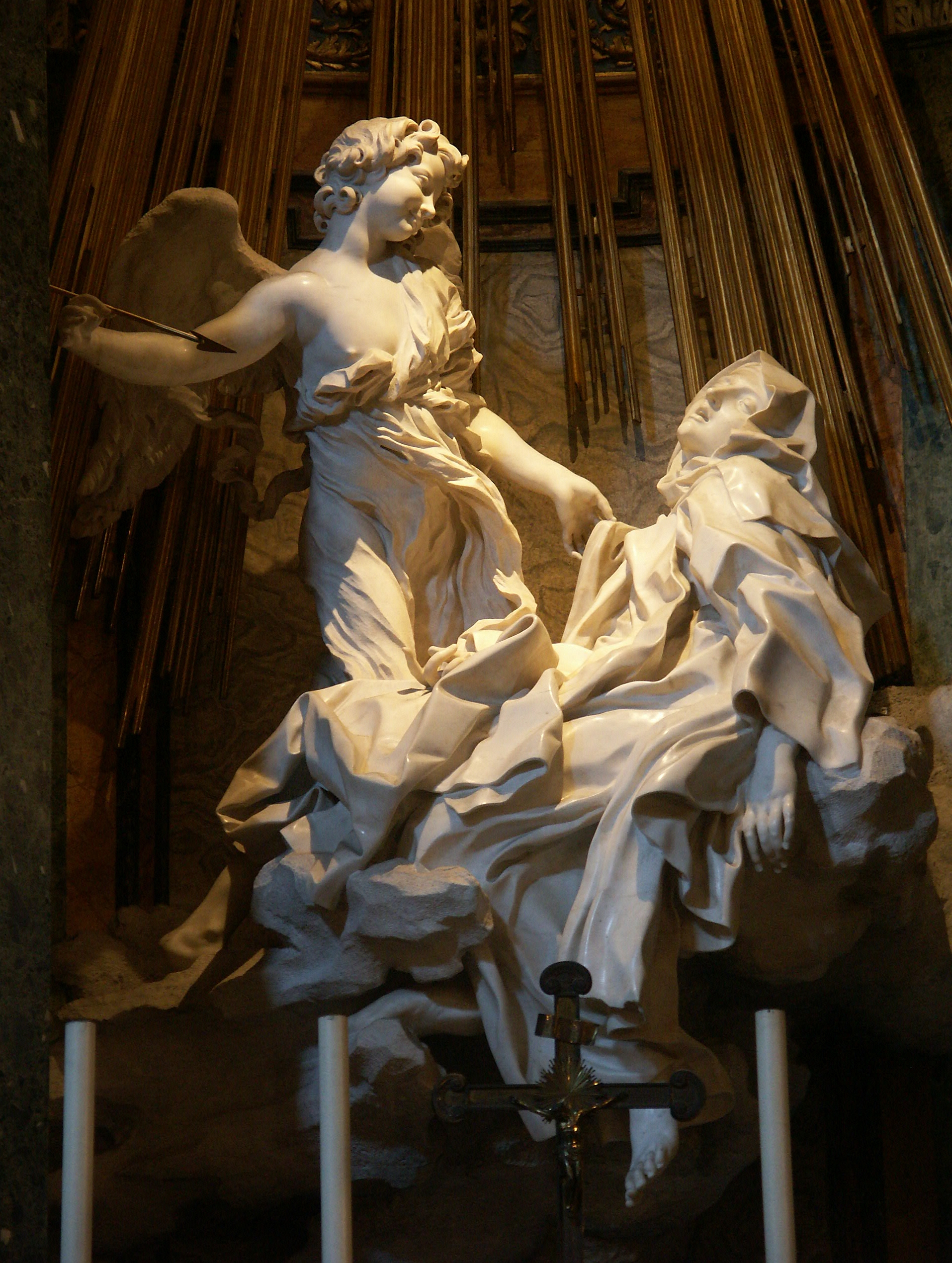
The Ecstasy of St. Theresa by Gianlorenzo Bernini (1652). Left transept of Santa Maria della Vittoria (17th century) in Rome.

Ecstasy (from Ancient Greek ἔκστασις (ékstasis) 'outside of oneself') is a subjective experience of total involvement of the subject with an object of their awareness. In classical Greek literature, it refers to removal of the mind or body "from its normal place of function."

Total involvement with an object of interest is not an ordinary experience. Ecstasy is an example of an altered state of consciousness characterized by diminished awareness of other objects or the total lack of the awareness of surroundings and everything around the object. The word is also used to refer to any heightened state of consciousness or intensely pleasant experience. It is also used more specifically to denote states of awareness of non-ordinary mental spaces, which may be perceived as spiritual (the latter type of ecstasy often takes the form of religious ecstasy).

== Description ==
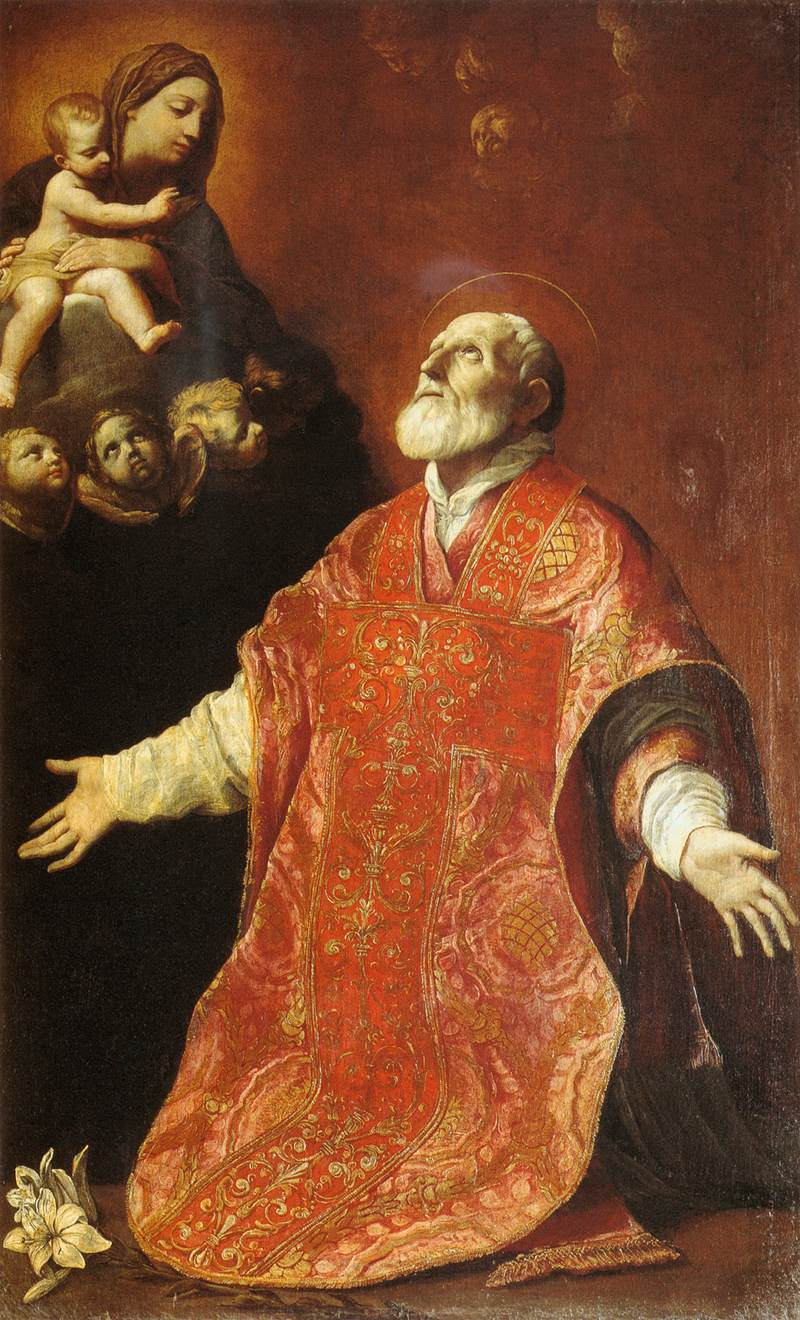
St Filippo Neri in Ecstasy by Guido Reni

From a psychological perspective, ecstasy is a loss of self-control and sometimes a temporary loss of consciousness, which is often associated with religious mysticism, sexual intercourse and the use of certain drugs. For the duration of the ecstasy the ecstatic is out of touch with ordinary life and is capable neither of communication with other people nor of undertaking normal actions. The experience can be brief in physical time, or it can go on for hours. Subjective perception of time, space or self may strongly change or disappear during ecstasy. For instance, if one is concentrating on a physical task, then any intellectual thoughts may cease. On the other hand, making a spirit journey in an ecstatic trance involves the cessation of voluntary bodily movement.

== Types ==
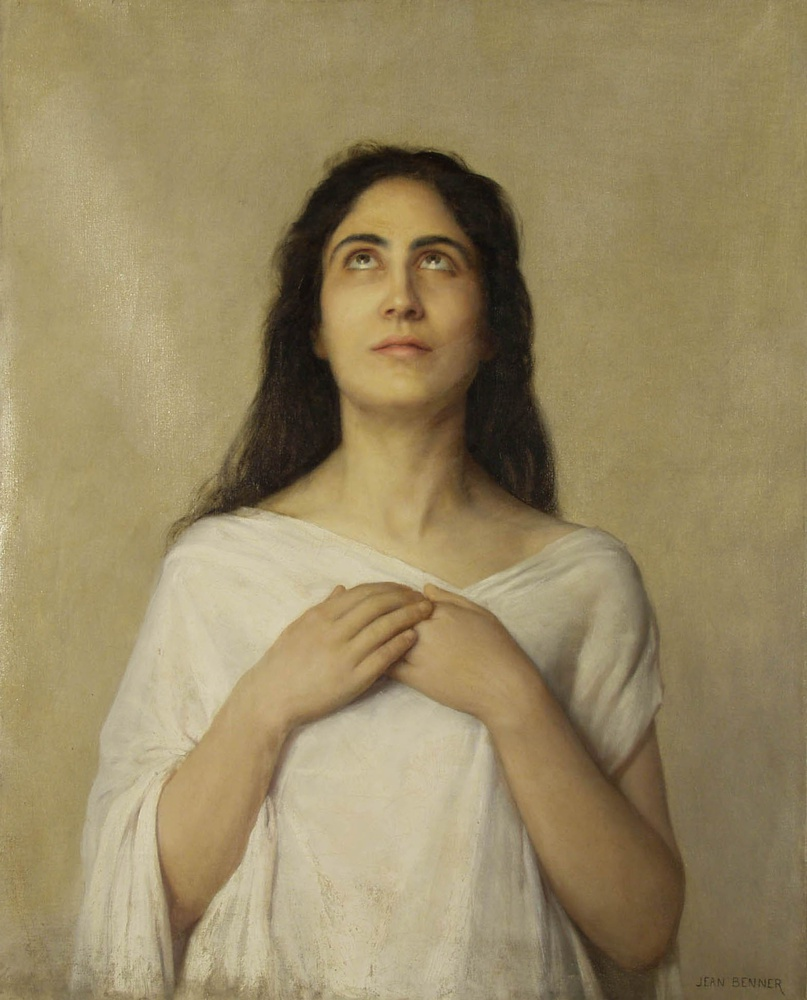
Ecstasy, by Jean Benner (Strasbourg Museum of Modern and Contemporary Art)

Ecstasy can be deliberately induced using religious or creative activities, meditation, music, dancing, breathing exercises, physical exercise, sexual intercourse or consumption of psychotropic drugs. The particular technique that an individual uses to induce ecstasy is usually also associated with that individual's particular religious and cultural traditions. Sometimes an ecstatic experience takes place due to occasional contact with something or somebody perceived as extremely beautiful or holy, or without any known reason. "In some cases, a person might obtain an ecstatic experience 'by mistake'. Maybe the person unintentionally triggers one of the probably many, physiological mechanisms through which such an experience can be reached. In such cases, it is not rare to find that the person later, by reading, looks for an interpretation and maybe finds it within a tradition."

People interpret the experience afterward according to their culture and beliefs (as a revelation from God, a trip to the world of spirits or a psychotic episode). "When a person is using an ecstasy technique, he usually does so within a tradition. When he reaches an experience, a traditional interpretation of it already exists." The experience together with its subsequent interpretation may strongly and permanently change the value system and the worldview of the subject (e.g. to cause religious conversion).

In 1925, James Leuba wrote: "Among most uncivilized populations, as among civilized peoples, certain ecstatic conditions are regarded as divine possession or as union with the divine. These states are induced by means of drugs, by physical excitement, or by psychical means. But, however produced and at whatever level of culture they may be found, they possess certain common features which suggest even to the superficial observer some profound connection. Always described as delightful beyond expression, these awesome ecstatic experiences end commonly in mental quiescence or even in total unconsciousness." He prepares his readers "... to recognize a continuity of impulse, of purpose, of form and of result between the ecstatic intoxication of the savage and the absorption in God of the Christian mystic."

"In everyday language, the word 'ecstasy' denotes an intense, euphoric experience. For obvious reasons, it is rarely used in a scientific context; it is a concept that is extremely hard to define."

== See also ==
- Ecstatic seizures
- Entheogen
- Flow (psychology)
- Lisztomania
- Poem of Ecstasy
- Soul flight
