= Religious delusion =

Delusion involving religious themes

A religious delusion is defined as a delusion, or fixed belief not amenable to change in light of conflicting evidence, involving religious themes or subject matter.

== Definition ==
Individuals experiencing religious delusions are preoccupied with religious subjects that are not within the expected beliefs for an individual's background, including culture, education, and known experiences of religion. These preoccupations are incongruous with the mood of the subject. Falling within the definition also are delusions arising in psychotic depression; however, these must present within a major depressive episode and be congruous with mood. Some psychologists have characterized all or nearly all religion as delusion.

A clear framework for distinguishing religious delusions from socially or culturally acceptable religious beliefs was outlined by Andrew Sims (1995), who proposed a set of criteria to improve diagnostic reliability. These criteria help clinicians avoid misclassifying normative religious experiences as delusional by focusing on specific features of the belief and its broader context. According to Sims, a belief may be identified as a religious delusion if it meets the following criteria:

1. The individual’s behaviour and subjective experience align with recognised psychopathological symptoms, wherein the self-reported experience exhibits the structure and characteristics of a delusion.
2. There is evidence of additional psychopathological symptoms in other areas of the individual's life, such as the presence of other delusions, hallucinations, or disturbances in mood or thought processes.
3. The individual’s lifestyle, behaviour, and personal goals following the religious experience are more consistent with the trajectory of a mental disorder than with a transformative or personally enriching experience.

Researchers in a 2000 study found religious delusions to be unrelated to any specific set of diagnostic criteria, but correlated with demographic criteria, primarily age. In a comparative study sampling 313 patients, those with religious delusion were found to be aged older, and had been placed on a drug regime or started a treatment programme at an earlier stage. In the context of presentation, their global functioning was found to be worse than another group of patients without religious delusions. The first group also scored higher on the Scale for the Assessment of Positive Symptoms (SAPS), had a greater total on the Brief Psychiatric Rating Scale (BPRS), and were treated with a higher mean number of neuroleptic medications of differing types during their hospitalization.

Religious delusion was found in 2007 to strongly correlate with "temporolimbic overactivity". This is a condition where irregularities in the brain's limbic system may present as symptoms of schizophrenia.

In a 2010 study, Swiss psychiatrists found religious delusions with themes of spiritual persecution by malevolent spirit-entities, control exerted over the person by spirit-entities, delusional experience of sin and guilt, or delusions of grandeur.

Mannerisms that were considered unconventional were typically viewed in a negative congitation. Religious delusions have generally been found to be less stressful than other types of delusion. A study found adherents to new religious movements to have similar delusionary cognition, as rated by the Delusions Inventory, to a psychotic group, although the former reported feeling less distressed by their experiences than the latter.

== History ==
In 1983 propositions that religious shamans were motivated by delusions and that their behaviour resembled that of patients with schizophrenia were found to be incorrect.

In Moses and Monotheism, Sigmund Freud stated that he considered believing in a single god to be a delusion, thus extending his 1907 comment that religion is the indication of obsessional neurosis. His thoughts defining "delusion" perhaps crystallized from the notion of the religion formulations of the common man (circa 1927) as "patently infantile, foreign to reality"; around the same year he also stated that religion "comprises a system of wishful illusions together with a disavowal of reality, such as we find in an isolated form nowhere else but amentia, in a state of blissful hallucinatory confusion".

== Prevalence ==
A 2008, 295-subject study in Lithuania found that the most common religious delusions, were being a saint (in women), and being God (in men).

In a 2002 UK study of 193 people who had previously been admitted to hospital and subsequently diagnosed with schizophrenia, 24% were found to have religious delusions.

A 1999 US study identified that religious delusions were often present or expressed in persons with forensic committal to a psychiatric unit.

== Historical figures ==
Researchers have discussed whether historical figures may have had religious delusions.

=== Biblical ===
Although many researchers have brought evidence for a positive role that religion plays in health, others have shown that religious practices and experiences may be linked to mental illnesses of various kinds (mood disorders, personality disorders, psychiatric disorders). In 2011, a team of psychiatrists, behavioral psychologists, neurologists and neuropsychiatrists from the Harvard Medical School published research that suggested the development of a new diagnostic category of psychiatric disorders related to religious delusion and hyperreligiosity.

They compared the thought and behavior of the most important figures in the (namely, Abraham and Moses in the Hebrew Bible and Jesus and Paul of Tarsus in the Christian Bible) with patients affected by mental disorders related to the psychotic spectrum using different clusters of disorders and diagnostic criteria (DSM-IV-TR), and concluded that these biblical figures "may have had psychotic symptoms that contributed inspiration for their revelations", such as schizophrenia, schizoaffective disorder, bipolar disorder, delusional disorder, delusions of grandeur, auditory-visual hallucinations, paranoia, Geschwind syndrome (Paul especially), and abnormal experiences associated with temporal lobe epilepsy (TLE).

=== Historical ===
A religious experience of communication from heavenly or otherwise divine beings could be interpreted as a test of faith. An example of such is Joan of Arc, La Pucelle d'Orléans, who rallied French forces late in the Hundred Years' War.

Daniel Paul Schreber is an example of a supposed religious delusion occurring in a developed condition of psychosis. Schreber was a successful and highly respected German judge until middle age, when he came to believe that God was turning him into a woman. Two of his three illnesses (1884–1885 and 1893–1902) are described in his book Memoirs of My Nervous Illness (original German title Denkwürdigkeiten eines Nervenkranken), which became an influential book in the history of psychiatry and psychoanalysis thanks to its interpretation by Sigmund Freud.

The Harvard Medical School research also focused on social models of psychopathology, analyzing new religious movements and charismatic cult leaders such as David Koresh, leader of the Branch Davidians, and Marshall Applewhite, founder of the Heaven's Gate cult. The researchers concluded that "If David Koresh and Marshall Applewhite are appreciated as having psychotic-spectrum beliefs, then the premise becomes untenable that the diagnosis of psychosis must rigidly rely upon an inability to maintain a social group. A subset of individuals with psychotic symptoms appears [sic] able to form intense social bonds and communities despite having an extremely distorted view of reality. The existence of a better socially functioning subset of individuals with psychotic-type symptoms is corroborated by research indicating that psychotic-like experiences, including both bizarre and non-bizarre delusion-like beliefs, are frequently found in the general population. This supports the idea that psychotic symptoms likely lie on a continuum."

=== Auditory hallucination and crime ===
An individual may hear communication from heavenly or divine beings compelling one to commit acts of violence. In contemporary times, persons judged to have experienced auditory hallucinations include those hearing voices instructing or motivating them to commit violent acts. These auditory experiences are classified by psychiatry as command hallucinations. Individuals who commit acts such as murder have been reported hearing voices, or messages from deities, gods, spirits or other religious figures.

Thomas Szasz critiques the concept of religious auditory hallucination: those who hear the voice of God talking to them are supposedly experiencing schizophrenia, while those who talk to God but hear no response are simply praying.

== See also ==
- Creationism
- Criticism of religion
- Hyperreligiosity
- God complex
- The God Delusion
- Jerusalem syndrome
- Messiah complex
- Religion and schizophrenia
