= Oceanic feeling =

Feeling of being one with the world

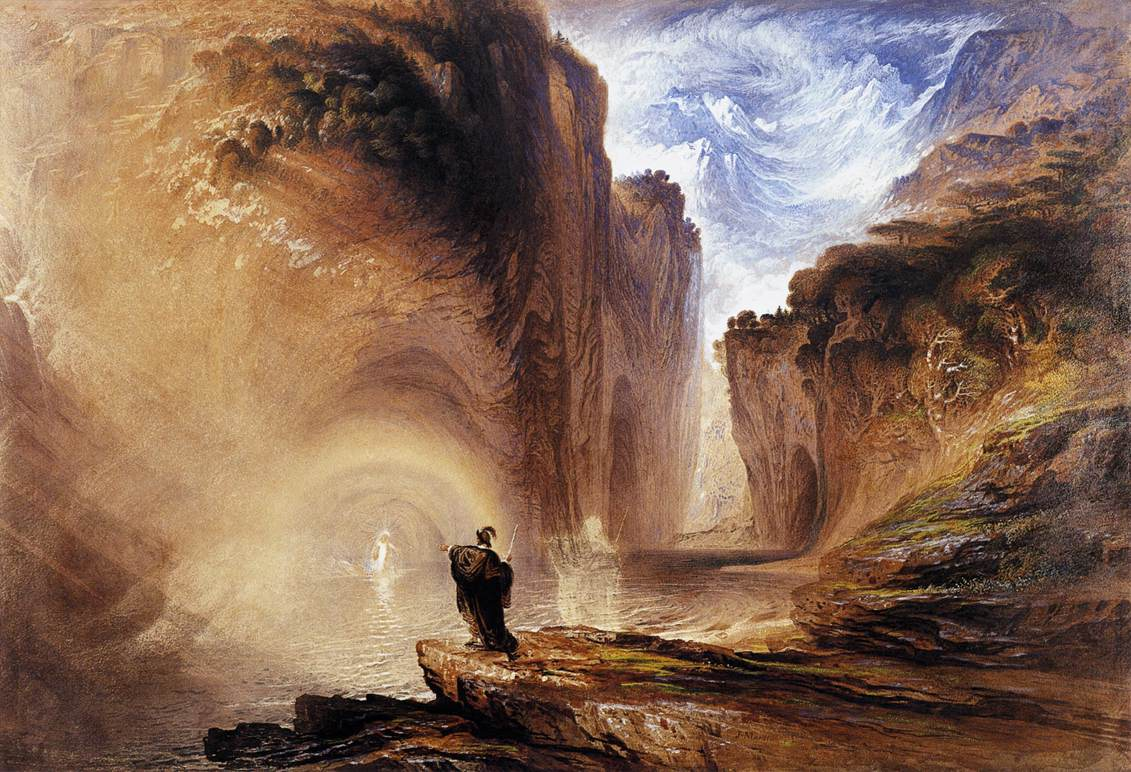
Manfred and the Alpine Witch, by John Martin

In a 1927 letter to Sigmund Freud, Romain Rolland coined the phrase "oceanic feeling" to refer to "a sensation of 'eternity'", a feeling of "being one with the external world as a whole", inspired by the example of Ramakrishna, among other mystics.

According to Rolland, this feeling is the source of all the religious energy that permeates various religious systems, and one may justifiably call oneself religious on the basis of this oceanic feeling alone, even if one renounces every belief and every illusion. Freud discusses the feeling in his Civilization and Its Discontents (1929). There he deems it a fragmentary vestige of a kind of consciousness possessed by an infant who has not yet differentiated itself from other people and things.

== History ==
In November 1927, Freud's new book The Future of an Illusion was printed, and one of the copies was sent by him to Rolland. Rolland responded with a letter to Freud, writing that he should also consider spiritual experiences, or "the oceanic feeling", in his future psychological works:

Mais j'aurais aimé à vous voir faire l'analyse du sentiment religieux spontané ou, plus exactement, de la sensation religieuse qui est [...] le fait simple et direct de la sensation de l'éternel (qui peut très bien n'être pas éternel, mais simplement sans bornes perceptibles, et comme océanique).

But I would have liked to see you doing an analysis of spontaneous religious sentiment or, more exactly, of religious feeling which is [...] the simple and direct fact of the feeling of the eternal (which can very well not be eternal, but simply without perceptible limits, and like oceanic).

— Letter from Rolland to Freud, December 5, 1927

Rolland based his description on the example of Ramakrishna who had his first spiritual ecstasy at the age of six. From his 10th or 11th year of school on, the trances became common, and by the final years of his life, Ramakrishna's samādhi periods occurred almost daily.

Rolland described the trances and mystical states experienced by Ramakrishna and other mystics as an "'oceanic' sentiment", one which Rolland had also experienced. As described by Rolland, it is "a sensation of 'eternity', a feeling as of something limitless, unbounded", a "feeling of an indissoluble bond, of being one with the external world as a whole". Rolland believed that the universal human religious emotion resembled this "oceanic sense". In his 1929 book The Life of Ramakrishna, Rolland distinguished between the feelings of unity and eternity which Ramakrishna experienced in his mystical states, and Ramakrishna's interpretation of those feelings as visions of the goddess Kali figure.

In July 1929, Freud asked for permission to publish in his next book an answer to Rolland's previous request about oceanic feelings.

Your letter of Dec. 5, 1927, containing your remarks about a feeling you describe as "oceanic" has left me no peace. It happens that in a new work which lies before me still uncompleted I am making a starting point of this remark; I mention this "oceanic" feeling and am trying to interpret it from the point of view of our psychology.

— Letter from Freud to Rolland, July 14, 1929

In the beginning of his new book Civilization and Its Discontents (1929), Freud attributed the concept to an anonymous friend, but in a later edition a footnote was added revealing Rolland's name.

== Freud's explanation ==
Freud argues that the "oceanic feeling", if it exists, is the preserved "primitive ego-feeling" from infancy. The primitive ego-feeling precedes the creation of the ego and exists up until the mother ceases breastfeeding. Prior to this, the infant is regularly breastfed in response to its crying and has no concept that the breast does not belong to it. Therefore, the infant has no concept of a "self" or, rather, considers the breast to be part of itself. Freud argues that those experiencing an oceanic feeling as an adult are actually experiencing a preserved primitive ego-feeling. The ego, in contrast, comes into existence when the breast is taken away, and involves the infant's recognition that it is separate from the mother's breast, and therefore, that other people exist. Freud argues that it would not necessarily contradict psychoanalytical theory for this primary ego-feeling to coexist along with the ego in some people. The main argument for this is that psychoanalytical theory holds that all thoughts are preserved in a conservation of psychic energy. Therefore, the "oceanic feeling" described as a oneness with the world or a limitlessness is simply a description of the feeling the infant has before it learns there are other persons in the world.

== Other explanations ==
The relevance of Romain's stance on the oceanic feeling has been recognized by scholars, who argue for a more encompassing understanding of religion and spirituality, offering a transformational model of psychology which validates the claims of mystics. Neurotheology, on the other hand, investigates the neurological basis of religious experiences, such as oneness with the universe and ecstatic trance.

Early on, Ramakrishna's spontaneous experiences have been interpreted as epileptic seizures, an interpretation which was rejected by Ramakrishna himself. According to Anil D. Desai, Ramakrishna suffered from psychomotor epilepsy, also called temporal lobe epilepsy. (Note: See: Devinsky, J.; Schachter, S. (2009). "Norman Geschwind's contribution to the understanding of behavioral changes in temporal lobe epilepsy: The February 1974 lecture". Epilepsy & Behavior. 15 (4): 417–24. doi:10.1016/j.yebeh.2009.06.006. PMID 19640791. S2CID 22179745. for a description of characteristics of Temporal Lobe Epilepsy, including increased religiosity as "a very striking feature". See also Geschwind syndrome, for descriptions of behavioral phenomena evident in some temporal lobe epilepsy patients, and Jess Hill, Finding God in a seizure: the link between temporal lobe epilepsy and mysticism, for some first-hand descriptions of epilepsy-induced "visions and trance-like states".)

These experiences can also be intentionally induced. Andrew B. Newberg, Eugene G. d'Aquili, and Vince Rause found that "intensely focused spiritual contemplation triggers an alteration in the activity of the brain that leads one to perceive transcendent religious experiences as solid, tangible reality. In other words, the sensation that Buddhists call oneness with the universe".

Bulgarian-French philosopher Julia Kristeva writes about oceanic feeling in Black Sun: Depression and Melancholia. Her conception is similar to Freud's, relating the feeling to infantile regression. More recently black studies scholar and poet Jackie Wang wrote about the notion of oceanic feeling in the article "Oceanic Feeling and Communist Affect," outlining its historic development through the work of Rolland and his relation to Spinoza, Freud, Kristeva, finally relating it to blackness and the trauma of the Middle Passage as discussed by Fred Moten.

== See also ==
- Awe
- Ego death
- Jouissance
- Peak experience
- Psychic equivalence
- Richard Maurice Bucke's 1901 book Cosmic Consciousness
- Sublime
- Transparent eyeball
- Wonder (emotion)

== General and cited sources ==
- Adiswarananda, Swami (2005), The Spiritual Quest and the Way of Yoga. The Goal, the Journey and the Milestones, Woodstock, Vermont: SkyLight Paths Publishing, ISBN 978-1-594-73113-6
- Bennett, A.E. (December 1962), "Psychiatric aspects of psychomotor epilepsy", California Medicine, 97 (6): 346–9, PMC 1575714, PMID 13967457
- Bhawuk, Dharm P.S. (February 2003). "Culture's influence on creativity: the case of Indian spirituality". International Journal of Intercultural Relations. 27 (1). Elsevier: 8. doi:10.1016/S0147-1767(02)00059-7.
- Burton, Robert A. (5 February 2008), "Neurotheology", On Being Certain. Believing You Are Right Even When You're Not, New York City: Macmillan Publishers/St. Martin's Press, ISBN 9781429926119 ISBN 1-42992611-2; ISBN 978-1-429-92611-9 (Macmillan Publishers edition). ISBN 0-31235920-9; ISBN 978-0-312-35920-1 (St. Martin's Press edition)
- Freud, Sigmund (1975). Strachey, James (ed.). The Standard Edition of the Complete Psychological Works of Sigmund Freud. The Future of an Illusion, Civilization and its Discontents and Other Works (1927–1931). Vol. XXI. London: Hogarth Press. ISBN 0-7012-0067-7.
- Katrak, Sarosh M. (2006). "An eulogy for Prof. Anil D. Desai". Annals of Indian Academy of Neurology. 9 (4): 253–254. doi:10.4103/0972-2327.29215. S2CID 70463133.
- Masson, Jeffrey Moussaieff (6 December 2012) [1st ed.: 1980], The Oceanic Feeling. The Origins of Religious Sentiment in Ancient India, Springer Science & Business Media, ISBN 978-9-400-98969-6
- Neevel, Walter G. (1976), "The transformation of Sri Ramakrishna (pp. 53ff.)", in Smith, Bardwell L. (ed.), Hinduism. New Essays in the History of Religions, Leiden: E. J. Brill, ISBN 978-9-004-04495-1
- Ostow, Mortimer (2006), Spirit, Mind, and Brain. A Psychoanalytic Examination of Spirituality and Religion, New York City: Columbia University Press, ISBN 978-0-231-51120-9
- Parsons, William B. (17 June 1999), The Enigma of the Oceanic Feeling. Revisioning the Psychoanalytic Theory of Mysticism, Oxford University Press, ISBN 978-0-195-35408-9
- Vivekananda (2005), Prabuddha Bharata, vol. 110, Advaita Ashrama
- Zaleski, Philip; Zaleski, Carol (2005), "Chapter 6 - The Ecstatic (pp. 158ff.)", Prayer. A History, Boston: Houghton Mifflin Harcourt, ISBN 978-0-618-15288-9
