= Orgasmic epilepsy =

Rare form of epilepsy causing orgasms

- Other names: Orgasmic seizures; Orgasmic epileptic seizures; Orgasmic convulsions; Orgasmic auras; Epilepsy with orgasmic seizures
- Symptoms: Auras with spontaneous orgasms
- Causes: Epilepsy
- Frequency: Rare

Orgasmic epilepsy is a rare form of epilepsy that involves auras in which spontaneous orgasms occur. Due to their rarity and sensitive nature, they have mostly been reported as single cases and case series. A broader category is epilepsy with sexual auras generally. There are similarities and overlap of orgasmic epilepsy with ecstatic epilepsy and certain other forms of epilepsy. Orgasmic seizures were first reported in 1960 and a number of additional cases have been reported since then.
