= Hyperreligiosity =

- Specialty: Psychiatry, Neurology

Hyperreligiosity (also known as extreme religiosity) is a psychiatric disturbance in which a person experiences intense religious beliefs or episodes that interfere with normal functioning. Hyperreligiosity generally includes abnormal beliefs and a focus on religious content or even atheistic content, which interferes with work and social functioning. Hyperreligiosity may occur in a variety of disorders including epilepsy, psychotic disorders and frontotemporal lobar degeneration. Hyperreligiosity is a symptom of Geschwind syndrome, which is associated with temporal lobe epilepsy.

== Signs and symptoms ==
Hyperreligiosity is characterized by an increased tendency to report supernatural or mystical experiences, spiritual delusions, rigid legalistic thoughts, and extravagant expression of piety. Hyperreligiosity may also include religious hallucinations. Hyperreligiosity can also be expressed as intense atheistic beliefs.

== Pathophysiology and cause ==
Hyperreligiosity may be associated with epilepsy (in particular, temporal lobe epilepsy involving complex partial seizures), bipolar disorder, frontotemporal lobar degeneration, anti-NMDA receptor encephalitis, substance-induced psychosis, and psychotic disorders more broadly. In those with seizure disorders, episodic hyperreligosity may occur during seizures or postictally but is usually a stable personality feature occurring interictally. In a small study, hyperreligiosity was associated with decreased right hippocampal volume relative to normo-religiosity. Increased activity in the left temporal regions has been associated with hyperreligiosity in psychotic disorders. Pharmacological evidence points towards dysfunction in the ventral dopaminergic pathway as explanatory of hyperreligiosity.

== Treatment ==
Epilepsy related cases may respond to antiepileptics.

== See also ==
- Foolishness for Christ
- Jerusalem syndrome
- Messiah complex
- Religious delusion
- Religious fundamentalism
- Religious fanaticism
- Religion and schizophrenia
- Religious obsessive-compulsive disorder
