= Ramakrishna's samadhi =

Ramakrishna's samādhi was an ecstasy-filled trance-like state that Indian mystic Ramakrishna used to undergo.

== Description ==
During his trances, Ramakrishna reportedly became unconscious and sat in a fixed position for a short time, or for hours, and would then slowly return to normal consciousness. Popular reports say that when he was in this condition, physicians could find no trace of pulse or heart beat. His disciples believed that he had the power of inducing samādhi in others. Some said these recurrent trances left his body extraordinarily sensitive and delicate.

According to some biographers, Ramakrishna's trances were accompanied by reduction of respiration and heart-rate, high body temperature and tremor of the fingers. It is also said that after divine visions during this spiritual sadhana, usually the next day, Ramakrishna used to feel intense pain, so he eventually used to resist the vision to avoid the pain.

Ramakrishna described his trances as a "limitless infinite, effulgent ocean of consciousness or spirit".

During many occasions, he went into 'samadhi' after touching a woman. He himself once described that he feels repulsive towards women and if somehow he happens to touch one, his hand would feel sudden jerk or twitching in his body, accompanied by intense pain – "If a woman touches me I fall ill. That part of my body aches as if stung by a horned fish."

Ramakrishna's direct disciple Swami Saradananda mentioned in his biography Leelaprasanga that his guru used to go into a trance by uttering the name of a woman's genital – "The private part of a woman's body, the mere mention of which gives rise to only a disgusting feeling of lust in our sinful mind ... many a times I have seen this weird godman going into a trance by uttering the name of that very thing."

In another chapter of Leelaprasanga, Saradananda mentioned that when Ramakrishna lived with his young wife, once he wanted to check his feeling of lust, whether he had truly eradicated all lustful impressions from his mind or not. So he tried to touch his wife, Sarada Devi, when she was asleep, but the moment he touched her, he went into deep samadhi and remained in that state the entire night.

As a young man, Ramakrishna experimented with different forms of religion, including Islam and Tantra. He took his Tantra lessons from a Brahmin woman who made him eat human flesh from a funeral pyre and sit on the lap of a young naked woman. During both occasions, Ramakrishna went into samadhi and performed the taboo practices in a state of unconsciousness.

During the later stage of his life, when he became famous as a spiritual guru among the young intellectuals of Bengal, often he was asked to perform his samadhi in front of educated men. He was always reluctant to do so, he never performed this act as a mere display for sceptics or posing for photographs. The famous three photographs of Sri Ramakrishna were indeed taken when he was in such trance states, Samadhi.

He was known to go into trance at the touch of money too. Reportedly, his hand would twitch, and he would feel excruciating pain. Once the coin was removed, he would return to normalcy.

== Medical examinations ==
Mahendralal Sarkar, a physician of Calcutta who treated Ramakrishna during his final days, is one of the first-hand witnesses who examined Ramakrishna during his samadhi. Sarkar reportedly was a rationalist, who did not share the religious views of Ramakrishna, nor did he see him as an avatar He was present during several ecstasies of Ramakrishna and studied them from a medical point of view. Later he wrote a book called On the Physiological Basis of Psychology and provided scientific explanations for Ramakrishna's samadhi and various other psychological anomalies as per medical knowledge known at his time. Rolland mentions in a footnote in his book that it is said that stethoscopic examination of the heart and the condition of the eyes during samadhi show all the symptoms of death, but it is merely mentioned as a myth Ramakrishna's devotees believed without any direct indication that Sarkar himself proved this by any clinical examination.

Somnath Bhattacharyya, a psychoanalyst and psychologist, said Ramakrishna's samadhi states were accompanied by very profound inward withdrawal of consciousness, and remarkable physiological changes, consistent with the highest stages of meditative absorption as documented in Hindu Tantra, Yoga and Buddhist literature.

Bhagavan Rudra was another who treated Ramakrishna. During one of his visits, Ramakrishna asked a devotee to bring a rupee coin. When he held it in his hand, the hand began to writhe, and he reported feeling pain. His breathing also stopped. After the coin had been taken away, he breathed deeply three times and relaxed his hand. Rudra ascribed this behavior to "action on the nerves." Ramakrishna also told Rudra that when a knot was tied in the corner of his cloth, he could not breathe until the knot was untied.

It is reported that in 1881, when Ramakrishna was once in ecstasy, another physician touched the eyeballs of Ramakrishna to test if his ecstasy was a real one. He was surprised to find no reaction from Ramakrishna.

== Scholarly views ==
Niranjan Dhar and Narasimha P. Sil reject the idea of supernatural elements in Ramakrishna's trance and consider it as epileptic seizure.

Walter G. Neevel and Bardwell L. Smith argue that Ramakrishna's ability to easily enter into trances was largely due to "his esthetic and emotional sensitivity — his capacity to so appreciate and identify with beauty and harmony in what he saw and did".

Leo Schneiderman said that Ramakrishna's samādhi, like his other "bizarre" behavior, could be understood in the context of the broad tradition of Hinduism, village shamanism, and the non-Sanskritic popular culture.
