= Geschwind syndrome =

Personality changes associated with temporal lobe epilepsy

- Other names: Gastaut–Geschwind syndrome, Waxman–Geschwind syndrome
- Specialty: Neurology, Psychiatry
- Symptoms: Intense emotionality, deepened cognitive and emotional responses, hypergraphia, atypical sexuality, hyperreligiosity, circumstantial speech
- Causes: Seizures in the temporal lobe

Geschwind syndrome, also known as Gastaut–Geschwind syndrome or Waxman–Geschwind syndrome, is a group of behavioral phenomena evident in some people with temporal lobe epilepsy. It is named for one of the first individuals to categorize the symptoms, Norman Geschwind, who published prolifically on the topic from 1973 to 1984. There is controversy surrounding whether it is a true neuropsychiatric disorder. Temporal lobe epilepsy causes mild chronic changes in personality which are interictal (occurring between seizures) and slowly intensify over time. Geschwind syndrome includes five primary changes: hypergraphia, hyperreligiosity, atypical (usually reduced) sexuality, circumstantiality, and intensified mental life. Not all symptoms must be present for a diagnosis. Only some people with epilepsy or temporal lobe epilepsy show features of Geschwind syndrome.

== Features ==
=== Hypergraphia ===
Hypergraphia is the tendency for extensive and compulsive writing or drawing, and has been observed in persons with temporal lobe epilepsy who have experienced multiple seizures. Those with hypergraphia display extreme attention to detail in their writing. Some such patients keep diaries recording meticulous details about their everyday lives. In certain cases, these writings demonstrate extreme interest in religious topics. These individuals also tend to have poor penmanship. Russian novelist Fyodor Dostoyevsky, known to have epilepsy, showed signs of Geschwind syndrome, including hypergraphia. In some cases hypergraphia can manifest with compulsive drawing. Drawings by patients with hypergraphia exhibit repetition and a high level of detail, sometimes morphing writing with drawing.

=== Hyperreligiosity ===
Some individuals may exhibit hyperreligiosity, characterized by increased, usually intense, religious feelings and philosophical interests, and partial (temporal lobe) epilepsy patients experiencing frequent auras, perceived as numinous in character, exhibit greater ictal and interictal spirituality. Some auras include ecstatic experiences. It has been claimed that many religious leaders may exhibit this form of epilepsy. These religious feelings can motivate beliefs within any religion, including voodoun, Christianity, Islam, and others. Furthermore, "in someone from a strongly religious background hyperreligiosity might appear as deeply felt atheism". There are reports of patients converting between religions. A few patients internalize their religious feelings: when asked if they are religious they say they are not. One reviewer concluded that the evidence for a link between temporal lobe epilepsy and hyperreligiosity "isn't terribly compelling".

=== Atypical sexuality ===
People with Geschwind syndrome reported higher rates of atypical or altered sexuality. In approximately half of affected individuals hyposexuality is reported. Less commonly, cases of hypersexuality have been reported.

=== Circumstantiality ===
Individuals who demonstrate circumstantiality (or viscosity) tend to continue conversations for a long time and talk repetitively.

=== Intensified mental life ===
Individuals may demonstrate an intensified mental life, including deepened cognitive and emotional responses. This tendency may pair with hypergraphia, leading to prolific creative output and a tendency toward intense, solitary pursuits.

== See also ==
- List of people with epilepsy#Religious figures
- Ecstatic seizures
- Fyodor Dostoevsky
- Pope Pius IX
- Teresa of Ávila
- Vincent van Gogh
