= James H. Leuba =

American psychologist (1868–1946)

James Henry Leuba
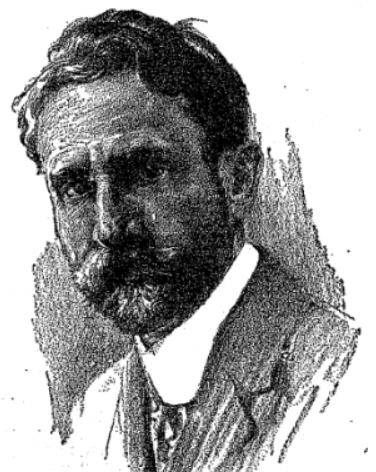
- Born: April 9, 1868; Motiers, Neuchatel, Switzerland
- Died: December 8, 1946 (aged 78); Winter Park, Florida
- Spouse: Bertha Aline Schopher
- Children: 7

Education
- Academic advisor: G. Stanley Hall

Philosophical work
- Era: 19th/20th century philosophy
- Region: Western Philosophy and Psychology
- School: Naturalism
- Main interests: Naturalism, psychology, psychology of religion, mysticism

James Henry Leuba (April 9, 1868 – December 8, 1946) was an American psychologist best known for his contributions to the psychology of religion. His son Clarence James Leuba was also a psychologist and taught at Antioch College in Yellow Springs, Ohio.

== Career ==
Leuba was born in Neuchâtel Switzerland, and later moved to America. He took his Ph.D. at Clark University under G. Stanley Hall. His work was marked by a tendency to explain mysticism and other religious experiences in psychological terms. Philosophically, his position may be described as naturalism. His work points to similarities between religious mysticism and yoga or drug-induced mysticism; he does accept differences between these in terms of moral motivation and to what uses mysticism is put. His psychological study of religion aroused opposition from churchmen. He argued for a naturalistic treatment of religion, which he considered to be necessary if religious psychology was to be looked at scientifically. He was an atheist.

== Bibliography ==
- Leuba, J. H. (1909). The Psychological Origin and the Nature of Religion.
- Leuba, J. H. (1912). The Psychological Study of Religion: Its Origin, Function, and Future. New York: Macmillan.
- Leuba, J. H. (1916). The Belief in God and Immortality. Boston: Sherman, French.
- Leuba, J. H. (1925). The Psychology of Religious Mysticism. New York: Harcourt, Brace. (1925 UK edition. London: Kegan Paul, Trench & Trubner).
- Leuba, J. H. (1933). God or Man? A Study of the Value of God to Man. New York: Henry Holt and Company. (1934 UK edition. London: Kegan Paul, Trench & Trubner).

== See also ==
- Psychology of religion
