= Spiritual crisis =

Identity crisis involving drastic changes to one's meaning system

Spiritual crisis (also called "spiritual emergency") is a form of identity crisis where an individual experiences drastic changes to their meaning system (i.e., their unique purposes, goals, values, attitude and beliefs, identity, and focus) typically because of a spontaneous spiritual experience. A spiritual crisis may cause significant disruption in psychological, social, and occupational functioning. Among the spiritual experiences thought to lead to episodes of spiritual crisis or spiritual emergency are psychiatric complications related to existential crisis, mystical experience, near-death experiences, Kundalini syndrome, mystical psychosis, ecstatic seizures, paranormal experiences, religious ecstasy, or other spiritual practices.

== Background ==
Before the mid-1970s, mainstream psychiatry made no distinction between spiritual or mystical experiences and mental illness (GAP, 1976, p. 806). However, during the 1960s and 1970s, the overlap of spiritual/mystical experiences and mental health problems became of particular interest to counterculture critics of mainstream psychiatric practice who argued that experiences that fall outside of the norm may simply be another way of constructing reality and not necessarily a sign of mental disorder. The assumption of mainstream medical psychiatry was also challenged by critics from within the field of medical psychiatry itself. For example, R. D. Laing argued that mental health problems could also be a transcendental experience with healing and spiritual aspects. Arthur J. Deikman further suggested use of the term "mystical psychosis" to characterize first-person accounts of psychotic experiences that are conceptually similar to reports of mystical experiences.

Due to growing recognition of the overlap of spiritual/mystical experiences and mental health problems, in the early 1990s authors Lukoff, Lu, & Turner (Turner et al., 1995, p. 435) made a proposal for a new diagnostic category entitled "Religious or Spiritual Problems". The category was approved by the DSM-IV Task Force in 1993 (Turner et al., 1995, p. 436) and is included in the fourth edition of the Diagnostic and Statistical Manual of Mental Disorders (DSM-IV) (American Psychiatric Association, 1994). The inclusion marks increasing professional acceptance of spiritual issues in the assessment of mental health problems.

== Study ==
The concept of "spiritual crisis" has mainly sprung from the work of transpersonal psychologists and psychiatrists whose view of the psyche stretches beyond that of Western psychology. Transpersonalists tend to focus less on psychopathology and more unidirectionally toward enlightenment and ideal mental health (Walsh & Vaughan, 1993). However, this emphasis on spirituality's potentials and health benefits has been criticized. According to James (1902), a spiritual orientation focusing only on positive themes is arguably incomplete, as it fails to address evil and suffering (Pargament et al., 2004). Scholarly attention to spiritual struggle is therefore timely as it can provide greater balance to the empirical literature and increase understanding of everyday spirituality. Another reason for the study of spiritual crisis is that growth often occurs through suffering (e.g., Tedeschi, Park, & Calhoun, 1998). As such, neglecting problems of suffering might result in neglecting vital sources of spiritual transformation and development.

Both the terms "spiritual crisis" and "spiritual emergency" (Grof, 1989) share in the common recognition that:

1. non-ordinary experiences and psychological disturbances (e.g., anxiety and panic) often overlap;
2. Western medicine may have different, and therefore potentially conflicting, values among their patients about these experiences;
3. people need specialized support in their local area when in crisis.

== Neurological causes ==
Spiritual crises, and spontaneous spiritual experiences, may have neurological causes, such as described in the Geschwind syndrome and in neurotheology. The Geschwind syndrome is a group of behavioral phenomena evident in some people with temporal lobe epilepsy. It is named for one of the first individuals to categorize the symptoms, Norman Geschwind, who published prolifically on the topic from 1973 to 1984. There is controversy surrounding whether it is a true neuropsychiatric disorder. Temporal lobe epilepsy causes chronic, mild, interictal (i.e. between seizures) changes in personality, which slowly intensify over time. Geschwind syndrome includes five primary changes; hypergraphia, hyperreligiosity, atypical (usually reduced) sexuality, circumstantiality, and intensified mental life. Not all symptoms must be present for a diagnosis.

== See also ==
- Altered state of consciousness
- Born again
- Broken heart
- Dark Night of the Soul
- Ego death
- Emotional dysregulation
- Existential crisis
- First Vision
- Fundamentalism
- Human spirit
- Ineffability
- Jerusalem syndrome
- Leap of faith
- Mental health
- Monomyth
- Mysticism
- Near death experience
- Post-traumatic stress disorder
- Qi Gong deviation
- Psychedelic experience
- Psychology of religion
- Religion and schizophrenia
- Religious experience
- Scrupulosity
- Spiritual dryness
- Spiritual philosophy
- Kundalini
- Spiritualism
- Spirituality
- Weltschmerz

== Sources ==
- American Psychiatric Association. (1994). Diagnostic and Statistical Manual of Mental Disorders, fourth edition. Washington, D.C.: American Psychiatric Association.
- GAP (Group for the Advancement of Psychiatry) (1976). Mysticism: Spiritual quest or psychic disorder? New York: GAP.
- Grof, S. & Grof, C. (Eds.) (1989). Spiritual emergency: When personal transformation becomes a crisis. Los Angeles: Tarcher.
- James, W. (1902). The Varieties of Religious Experience: A study in human nature. New York: Longmans, Green.
- Paloutzian, R. F. (2005) Religious conversion and spiritual transformation: A meaning- system analysis. In Paloutzian R.F. & Park, C.L. (Eds.), Handbook of the Psychology of Religion and Spirituality (pp. 331–347). New York: Guilford.
- Pargament, K. I., Murray-Swank, N., Magyar, G. M., & Ano, G. G. (2004). Spiritual struggle: A phenomenon of interest to psychology and religion. In W. R. Miller & H. Delaney (Eds.), Judeo-Christian perspectives in psychology: Human nature, motivation, and change (pp. 245–268). Washington, DC: APA Books.
- Tedeschi, R. G., Park, C. L., & Calhoun, R. G. (Eds.). (1998). Posttraumatic growth: Positive changes in the aftermath of crisis. Mahwah, NJ: Erlbaum.
- Turner, R. P.; Lukoff, D.; Barnhouse, R. T.; Lu, F. G. (1995). "Religious or spiritual problem: A culturally sensitive diagnostic category in the DSM-IV". Journal of Nervous and Mental Disease. 183 (7): 435–444. doi:10.1097/00005053-199507000-00003. PMID 7623015.
- Walsh, R.; Vaughan, F. (1993). "On transpersonal definitions". Journal of Transpersonal Psychology. 25: 125–82.
