= Deikman =

Deikman is a surname. Notable people with the surname include:

- Arthur J. Deikman (1929–2013), American physician
- Etta Deikman, American artist
