= The Wrong Way Home =

1990 book by Arthur J. Deikman

- Book cover, 1994 paperback edition
- Author: Arthur J. Deikman, M.D.
- Subject: cults
- Genre: non-fiction psychiatry
- Publisher: Beacon Press
- Publication date: September 1994
- Publication place: United States
- Media type: paperback
- Pages: 208
- ISBN: 978-0-8070-2915-2
- OCLC: 31483796
- Preceded by: The Observing Self (book)
- Followed by: Them and Us: Cult Thinking and the Terrorist Threat (book)

The Wrong Way Home: Uncovering the Patterns of Cult Behavior in American Society, is a book on cult culture within the United States, written by Arthur J. Deikman, M.D. The book was originally published in hardcover format in December 1990 by Beacon Press, and reprinted in paperback form September 1994. Dr. Deikman (d. 2013) was a professor of psychiatry at University of California, San Francisco, and a member of the editorial board of the Journal of Humanistic Psychology.

The book is used as part of the curriculum for the course "Cults and New Religious Movements" at St. Francis Xavier University. It is a cited reference in the Encyclopedia of Psychology, and is quoted in the article on cults, where the article asserts that: "Certain types of political groups and terrorist organizations are still other examples of 'cults' that defy the common definition of the term."

Deikman revised and republished the book in 2003 under the title Them and Us: Cult Thinking and the Terrorist Threat (Bay Tree Publications of Berkeley), with an introduction by Doris Lessing.

== Reviews ==
The book was reviewed by Robert L. Boyd, Ph.D. in Social Science Quarterly. It was reviewed in the Journal for the Scientific Study of Religion, by Larry J. Halford, in the Library Journal, by Lucy Patrick.

Patrick wrote: "Although we live in a democracy, cult behavior manifests itself in our unwillingness to question the judgment of our leaders, our tendency to devalue outsiders and to avoid dissent. We can overcome cult behavior, he says, by recognizing that we have dependency needs that are inappropriate for mature people, by increasing anti-authoritarian education, and by encouraging personal autonomy and the free exchange of ideas."

Genevieve Stuttaford wrote in Publishers Weekly: "Although Deikman sometimes stretches the analogy of cult behavior too far, his provocative book uncovers a psychopathology of everyday life in a discerning analysis."
