= Mystical psychosis =

Type of abnormal mental condition

Mystical psychosis is a term coined by Arthur J. Deikman in the early 1970s to characterize first-person accounts of psychotic experiences that are strikingly similar to reports of mystical experiences.

== Background ==
According to Deikman, and authors from a number of disciplines, psychotic experience need not be considered pathological, especially if consideration is given to the values and beliefs of the individual concerned.

=== Causes of deautomatization ===
Deikman thought the mystical experience was brought about through a "deautomatization" or undoing of habitual psychological structures that organize, limit, select, and interpret perceptual stimuli.

There may be several causes of deautomatization—exposure to severe stress, substance abuse or withdrawal, and mood disorders.

=== Mystical experiences ===
A closely related category is mystical experience with psychotic features, proposed by David Lukoff in 1985.

A first episode of mystical psychosis is often very frightening, confusing and distressing, particularly because it is an unfamiliar experience. For example, researchers have found that people experiencing paranormal and mystical phenomena report many of the symptoms of panic attacks.

On the basis of comparison of mystical experience and psychotic experience, Deikman came to a conclusion that mystical experience can be caused by "deautomatization" or transformation of habitual psychological structures which organize, limit, select and interpret perceptional incentives that is interfaced to heavy stresses and emotional shocks. He described usual symptoms of mystical psychosis which consist in strengthening of a receptive mode and weakening of a mode of action.

People susceptible to mystical psychosis become much more impressible. They feel a unification with society, with the world, God, and also feel washing out the perceptive and conceptual borders. Similarity of mystical psychosis to mystical experience is expressed in sudden, distinct and very strong transition to a receptive mode. It is characterized with easing the subject—object distinction, sensitivity increase and nonverbal, lateral, intuitive thought processes.

Deikman's opinion that experience of mystical experience in itself can't be a sign to psychopathology, even in case of this experience at the persons susceptible to neurophysiological and psychiatric frustration, in many respects defined the relation to mystical experiences in modern psychology and psychiatry.

Deikman considered that all-encompassing unity opened in mysticism can be all-encompassing unity of reality.

== See also ==
- Altered state of consciousness
- Depersonalization and Derealization
- Ecstatic seizures
- Ego death
- Existential crisis
- Dhyāna in Buddhism
- Dhyāna in Hinduism
- Jerusalem syndrome
- Mental health
- Moksha
- Mirror neurons
- Mystical experience
- Mysticism
- Monomyth
- Near-death experience
- Posttraumatic stress disorder
- Religious experience
- Spiritualism
- Spirituality
- Spiritual crisis
- Wujud
