= Quarter-life crisis =

Anxiety over the direction of one's life experienced in their twenties to thirties

In popular psychology, a quarter-life crisis is an existential crisis involving anxiety and sorrow over the direction and quality of one's life which is most commonly experienced in a period ranging from a person's early twenties up to their mid-thirties, although it can begin as early as eighteen. It is defined by clinical psychologist Alex Fowke as "a period of insecurity, doubt and disappointment surrounding your career, relationships and financial situation".

While the quarter-life crisis is not an official clinical diagnosis and does not appear in the Diagnostic and Statistical Manual of Mental Disorders (DSM-5-TR), it is increasingly recognized by mental health professionals and researchers as a genuine developmental challenge faced by young adults in contemporary society. The phenomenon has become a subject of academic research, with studies examining its prevalence through social media analysis and its relationship to modern factors such as student debt, competitive job markets, social comparison through social media, and the postponement of traditional adult milestones like marriage and home ownership.

== History ==
While the concept of a young adult crisis has been attributed to psychologist Erik Erikson in his 1968 work Identity, Youth and Crisis, where he described identity challenges facing people in their twenties and early thirties as part of his "Intimacy vs. Isolation" stage, he did not use the specific phrase "quarter-life crisis" in his writings.

The term "quarter-life crisis" was popularized by the 2001 book Quarterlife Crisis: The Unique Challenges of Life in Your Twenties by Alexandra Robbins and Abby Wilner. The book brought widespread attention to the phenomenon and served as a guide for young adults experiencing difficulty transitioning to adulthood. Following its publication, the concept gained further traction through media coverage and has become particularly associated with millennial experiences, with outlets like Psychology Today and Forbes featuring articles on the topic.

The term was modeled after "midlife crisis," which was coined by psychoanalyst Elliott Jaques in 1965.

== Characteristics ==
The main areas affected during a quarter-life crisis include career, relationships, and sense of identity. Individuals typically question whether their current career path or relationships are right for them, and struggle with making significant life changes. These major decisions ultimately impact one's sense of identity, leading to fundamental questions such as "who am I?"

During this period of questioning, individuals generally experience one of two types of crisis: "locked-out" or "locked-in." The locked-out experience involves being unable to access desired life commitments, such as finding meaningful employment, establishing romantic relationships, or making other major life transitions. In essence, external opportunities feel closed off. Conversely, the locked-in experience involves feeling trapped in unsatisfying circumstances, such as remaining in an unfulfilling job or relationship despite serious dissatisfaction.

These experiences produce both negative emotions and opportunities for growth. Common negative symptoms include anxiety, declining self-esteem (particularly when facing repeated rejections), and intense identity questioning. However, individuals who successfully navigate these challenges may experience post-crisis growth and enhanced life satisfaction in the longer term.

Quarter-life crises typically last approximately one year and occur during transitional periods of instability, often toward the end of emerging adulthood. The phenomenon is remarkably common, with research indicating that up to 70% of people in their thirties report having experienced a quarter-life crisis during their twenties.

== Causes ==
=== Internal ===
A literature review of the existing research on the quarter-life crisis reveals various internal factors that contribute to this phenomenon, three of which are more influential. These three critical factors include feelings of anxiety, commitment to purpose, and the level of one's religious and spiritual beliefs. Regarding anxiety, the level of anxious feelings one feels, such as fear, uncertainty, and stress, influence the harshness of the crisis that one is feeling. With commitment to purpose, people can feel imprisoned by the various life tasks or goals that they feel a responsibility of fulfilling, such as obstacles getting in the way of pursuing a well-paying job or getting married, which will also influence the level of crisis they experience. Lastly, people's religious and spiritual beliefs work to create a defense against the prevalence of this crisis in their lives. Related to anxiety, being less religious or spiritual may lead to having more anxiety and experiencing this crisis more severely. Aside from the big three internal factors, other internal factors that influence the presence of this issue in one’s life are issues of identity formation, how they feel about themselves, how confident they feel about themselves and their abilities, how motivated they feel, their ability to disclose, whether they have an optimistic or pessimistic view of the future, and their ability to reflect and focus on the positivity in their lives.

=== External ===
The literature review also reveals various external factors that contribute to this crisis, in which the more influential ones are relationships and demographic variables, such as age and gender. Lacking relationships and social support can increase the prevalence and severity of this crisis in one’s life. Social support acts as a buffer against the many challenges and stressors that come about in early adult life. With age, those in their late twenties and early thirties are more prone to experiencing this crisis. Those in their early twenties are less likely to experience this because they are still in school and still have time to make decisions and change their life directions. Those between the ages of twenty-five and thirty-three are more likely to experience this crisis because they are in a transitional period from college to working adult life. One's ethnicity can also have an impact on the prevalence of this crisis. Lastly, women are more likely to experience this crisis than men. Aside from the big two external factors, other external factors include finances, fitness habits, and substance use.

== In popular culture ==
=== Film ===
Notable films depicting quarter-life crises include:

- The Graduate (1967)
- The Paper Chase (1973)
- St. Elmo's Fire (1985)
- Reality Bites (1994)
- Bright Lights, Big City (1998)
- Fight Club (1999)
- High Fidelity (2000)
- Amélie (2001)
- Ghost World (2001)
- Lost in Translation (2003)
- Eternal Sunshine of the Spotless Mind (2004)
- Garden State (2004)
- Shaun of the Dead (2004)
- The Puffy Chair (2005)
- Accepted (2006)
- Stranger than Fiction (2006)
- How to Be (2008)
- Vicky Cristina Barcelona (2008)
- (500) Days of Summer (2009)
- Greenberg (2010)
- Tiny Furniture (2010)
- Frances Ha (2012)
- Silver Linings Playbook (2012)
- Laggies (2014)
- Quarter Life Crisis, Taylor Tomlinson (2020)
- It Ends (2025)

=== Music ===
The 2003 John Mayer single "Why Georgia" explores the concept of a quarter-life crisis. The song was based upon John Mayer's experiences during this age period, when he moved to Georgia.

The 1975 Fleetwood Mac song "Landslide", written by Stevie Nicks in her late twenties, explores many of the self-doubts and fears of the quarter-life crisis, at a time when Nicks professed to be uncertain about her musical career and her romantic life.

English indie rock band Spector's song "True Love (For Now)", the opening track to their 2012 album Enjoy It While It Lasts, references a quarter-life crisis.

"20 Something", the final track on SZA's 2017 album Ctrl, delves into the many insecurities she experienced in her twenties, both personal and professional, and the urgency she felt to make the most of her life before entering into mature adulthood.

In the album Pep Talks by Judah & the Lion, the lead single "Quarter-Life Crisis" is about the ensuing rootlessness and insecurity that lead vocalist Akers felt during his twenties, caused by the loss of his aunt and his parents' divorce.

The 2020 released EP Young Life Crisis by UPSAHL is about a breakup, lost friendships and a canceled tour, all during the coronavirus pandemic and the uncertainness around her life.

The 2022 song "Quarter Life Crisis" (stylized in all-caps for the track listing as "QUARTER LIFE CRISIS") by singer-songwriter Taylor Bickett addresses this topic through the eyes of its twenty-three year old subject who lists many aspects common to the central motif of young adult anxiety from a female perspective.

On 10 August 2023, British singer Baby Queen announced her debut album titled Quarter Life Crisis. It was released on 6 October 2023. The album's lead singles "Dream Girl", "We Can Be Anything" and for the deluxe edition "All The Things", and six of her other songs, were featured in the Netflix series based on the graphic novel, Heartstopper. Bella stated in an interview, "This album tells the story of my journey through my early 20s – leaving my childhood and my adolescence behind but never really losing my childlike wonder and never quite growing up. The songs are all facets of what early adulthood has been like for me while discovering new parts of myself, my sexuality, my past and my place in this world." She also added, "I really want this album to leave people feeling hopeful, because there is so much beauty to live through and look forward to and it truly is magical and extraordinary to be alive and to have the very short opportunity to experience every emotion imaginable." To support the album's release, Baby Queen also announced a headline tour titled "The Quarter Life Crisis Tour" throughout November 2023.

In 2023, singer-songwriter Wallice released her EP Mr Big Shot, with the title "Quarterlife" as the 4th track. The song is about herself, as she takes a look back on her life, and the choices she made, as she is about to turn 25. It explores many subjects people in their twenties can experience, such as regret, growing up and losing things along the way. This is also a message of hope, as she is "ready for a second fight". She also stated that the whole EP was supposed to be titled Quarterlife too, as she saw this EP as more personal and authentic.

On 6 March 2026, American rapper Nettspend released his debut studio album, Early Life Crisis. Despite mixed critical reception regarding its production style, the album's lyrical content focuses on the artist's struggle with sudden fame and the "early life" anxieties of a teenager thrust into the music industry, mirroring the core sentiments of the quarter-life crisis phenomenon from a Gen Alpha perspective.

== See also ==
- Angst
- Disenchantment
- Existential crisis
- Fear
- Midlife crisis
- Panic
- Status attainment
