= Ego death =

Complete loss of subjective self-identity

Ego death is a "complete loss of subjective self-identity". The term is used in various intertwined contexts, with related meanings. The 19th-century philosopher and psychologist William James uses the synonymous term "self-surrender", and Jungian psychology uses the synonymous term psychic death, referring to a fundamental transformation of the psyche. In death and rebirth mythology, ego death is a phase of self-surrender and transition, as described later by Joseph Campbell in his research on the mythology of the Hero's Journey. It is a recurrent theme in world mythology and is also used as a metaphor in some strands of contemporary western thinking.

In descriptions of drugs, the term is used synonymously with ego loss to refer to (temporary) loss of one's sense of self due to the use of drugs. The term was used as such by Timothy Leary et al. to describe the death of the ego in the first phase of an LSD trip, in which a "complete transcendence" of the self (Note: Leary et al.: "The first period (Chikhai Bardo) is that of complete transcendence − beyond words, beyond spacetime, beyond self. There are no visions, no sense of self, no thoughts. There are only pure awareness and ecstatic freedom from all game (and biological) involvements.") occurs.

The concept is also used in contemporary New Age spirituality and in the modern understanding of eastern religions to describe a permanent loss of "attachment to a separate sense of self" and self-centeredness. This conception is a part of Eckhart Tolle's teachings, where Ego is presented as an accumulation of thoughts and emotions, continuously identified with, which creates the idea and feeling of being a separate entity from one's self, and only by disidentifying one's consciousness from it can one truly be free from suffering.

== Definitions ==
Ego death and the related term "ego loss" have been defined in the context of mysticism by the religious studies scholar Daniel Merkur as "an imageless experience in which there is no sense of personal identity. It is the experience that remains possible in a state of extremely deep trance when the ego-functions of reality-testing, sense-perception, memory, reason, fantasy and self-representation are repressed [...] Muslim Sufis call it fana ('annihilation'), (Note: See also Encyclopædia Britannica, "Fana", and "Fana': Sufism's Notion of Self-Annihilation, or How Rumi Can Explain Why Nirvana is Samsara in Mahayana Buddhism" by Christopher Vitale.) and medieval Jewish kabbalists termed it 'the kiss of death'".

Carter Phipps equates enlightenment and ego death, which he defines as "the renunciation, rejection and, ultimately, the death of the need to hold on to a separate, self-centered existence". (Note: Cited in Rindfleisch 2007 and White 2012, and in Nondual Highlights, issue #1694, Saturday, January 31, 2004: "[E]go death [is] the final destruction of our attachment to a separate sense of self.")

In Jungian psychology, Ventegodt and Merrick define ego death as "a fundamental transformation of the psyche". Such a shift in personality has been labeled an "ego death" in Buddhism, or a psychic death by Jung.

In comparative mythology, ego death is the second phase of Joseph Campbell's description of the Hero's Journey, which includes a phase of separation, transition, and incorporation. The second phase is a phase of self-surrender and ego death, after which the hero returns to enrich the world with their discoveries.

In psychedelic culture, Leary, Metzner, and Alpert (1964) define ego death. They define ego loss as "... complete transcendence − beyond words, beyond spacetime, beyond self. There are no visions, no sense of self, no thoughts. There are only pure awareness and ecstatic freedom".

Several psychologists working on psychedelics have defined ego death. Alnaes (1964) defines ego death as "[L]oss of ego-feeling". Stanislav Grof (1988) defines it as "a sense of total annihilation [...] This experience of "ego death" seems to entail an instant merciless destruction of all previous reference points in the life of the individual [...] [E]go death means an irreversible end to one's philosophical identification with what Alan Watts called "skin-encapsulated ego". Johnson, Richards, and Griffiths (2008), paraphrasing Leary et al. and Grof define ego death as "temporarily experienc[ing] a complete loss of subjective self-identity." The psychologist John Harrison (2010) defines "[T]emporary ego death [as the] loss of the separate self[,] or, in the affirmative, [...] a deep and profound merging with the transcendent other."

== Conceptual development ==
The concept of "ego death" developed along a number of intertwined strands of thought, including especially the following: romantic movements and subcultures; Theosophy; anthropological research on rites of passage and shamanism; William James' self-surrender; Joseph Campbell's comparative mythology; Jungian psychology; the psychedelic scene of the 1960s; and transpersonal psychology.

=== Western mysticism ===
According to Merkur,

The conceptualisation of mystical union as the death of the ego, while the soul remains the sole bearer of the self, and its replacement by God's consciousness, has been a standard Roman Catholic trope since St. Teresa of Ávila; the motif traces back through Marguerite Porete, in the 13th century, to the fana, "annihilation", of the Islamic Sufis.

=== Jungian psychology ===
According to Ventegodt and Merrick, the Jungian term "psychic death" is a synonym for "ego death":

In order to radically improve global quality of life, it seems necessary to have a fundamental transformation of the psyche. Such a shift in personality has been labeled an "ego death" in Buddhism or a psychic death by Jung, because it implies a shift back to the existential position of the natural self, i.e., living the true purpose of life. The problem of healing and improving the global quality of life seems strongly connected to the unpleasantness of the ego-death experience and often a person who lacks the understanding necessary for personal development chooses death instead of personal transformation.

Ventegodt and Merrick refer to Jung's publications The Archetypes and the Collective Unconscious, first published in 1933, and Psychology and Alchemy, first published in 1944. (Note: The term is also being used by Poul Bjerre, in his 1929 publication Död och Förnyelse, "Death and Renewal.)

In Jungian psychology, a unification of archetypal opposites has to be reached, during a process of conscious suffering, in which consciousness "dies" and resurrects. Jung called this process "the transcendent function", (Note: See Frith Luton, Transcendent Function, and Miller, Jeffrey C. (2012), The Transcendent Function Jung's Model of Psychological Growth through Dialogue with the Unconscious (PDF), SUNY, archived from the original (PDF) on 2016-03-05) which leads to a "more inclusive and synthetic consciousness".

Jung used analogies with alchemy to describe the individuation process, and the transference-processes which occur during therapy.

According to Leeming et al., from a religious point of view, psychic death is related to St. John of the Cross' Ascent of Mt. Carmel and Dark Night of the Soul.

=== Mythology – The Hero with a Thousand Faces ===
The Hero's Journey

In 1949, Joseph Campbell published The Hero with a Thousand Faces, a study on the archetype of the Hero's Journey. It describes a common theme found in many cultures worldwide, and is also described in many contemporary theories on personal transformation. In traditional cultures it describes the "wilderness passage", the transition from adolescence into adulthood. It typically includes a phase of separation, transition, and incorporation. The second phase is a phase of self-surrender and ego death, whereafter the hero returns to enrich the world with his discoveries. Campbell describes the basic theme as follows:

A hero ventures forth from the world of common day into a region of supernatural wonder. Fabulous forces are there encountered and a decisive victory is won. The hero comes back from this mysterious adventure with the power to bestow boons on his fellow man.

This journey is based on the archetype of death and rebirth, in which the "false self" is surrendered and the "true self" emerges. A well known example is Dante's Divine Comedy, in which the hero descends into the underworld.

=== Psychedelics ===
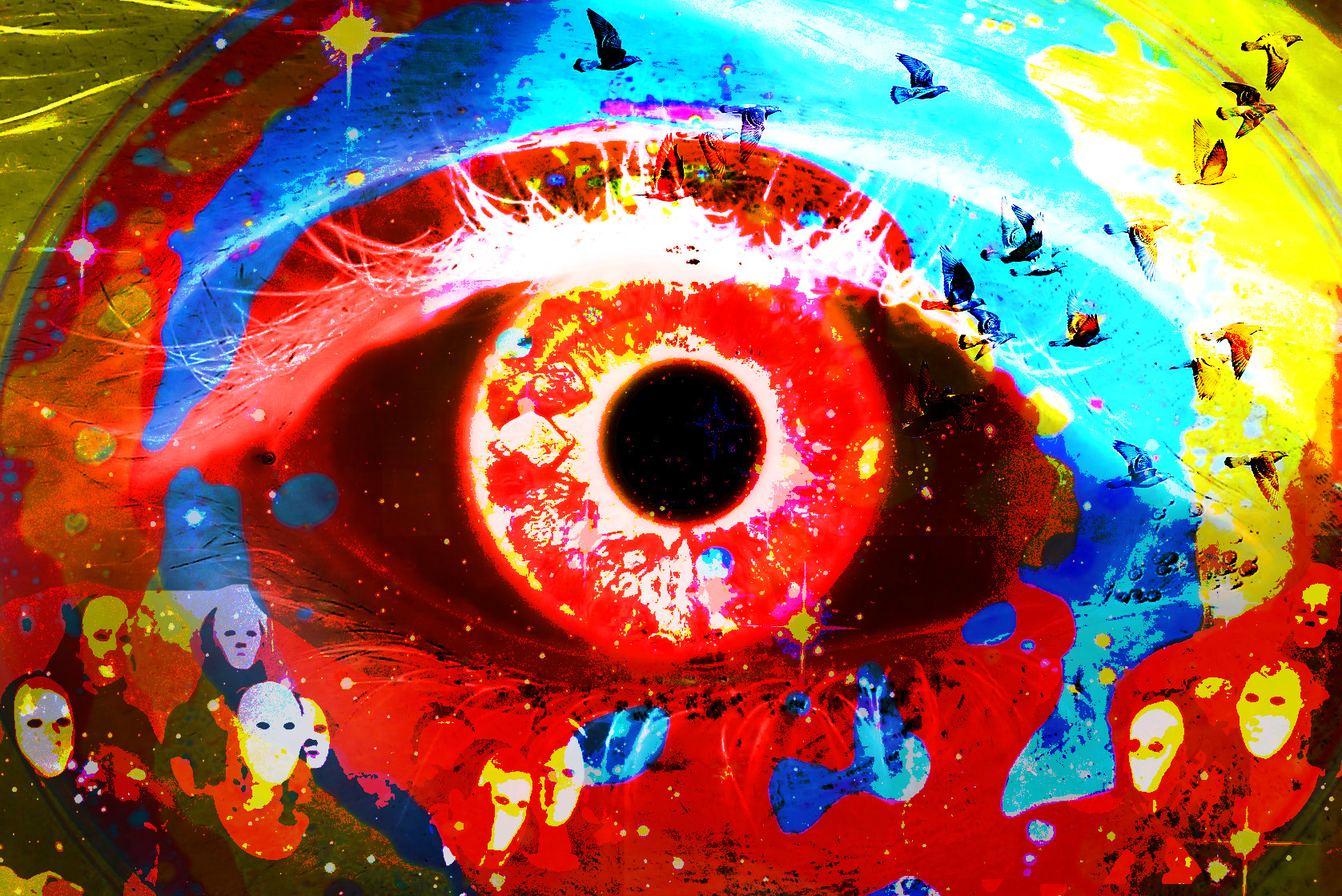
Artistic depiction of a psychedelic experience, illustrating heightened perception, sensory overload, and time disillusionment— all phenomena connected with ego death

Concepts and ideas from mysticism and bohemianism were inherited by the Beat Generation. When Aldous Huxley helped popularize the use of psychedelics, starting with The Doors of Perception, published in 1954, he also promoted a set of analogies with eastern religions, as described in The Perennial Philosophy. This book helped inspire the 1960s belief in a revolution in western consciousness and included the Tibetan Book of the Dead as a source. Similarly, Alan Watts, in his opening statement on mystical experiences in This Is It, draws parallels with Richard Bucke's 1901 book Cosmic Consciousness, describing the "central core" of the experience as

... the conviction, or insight, that the immediate now, whatever its nature, is the goal and fulfillment of all living.

This interest in mysticism helped shape the emerging research and popular conversation around psychedelics in the 1960s. In 1964 William S. Burroughs drew a distinction between "sedative" and "conscious-expanding" drugs. In the 1940s and 1950s the use of LSD was restricted to military and psychiatric researchers. One of those researchers was Timothy Leary, a clinical psychologist who first encountered psychedelic drugs while on vacation in 1960, and started to research the effects of psilocybin in 1961. He sought advice from Aldous Huxley, who advised him to propagate psychedelic drugs among society's elites, including artists and intellectuals. On insistence of Allen Ginsberg, Leary, together with his younger colleague Richard Alpert (Ram Dass) also made LSD available to students. In 1962 Leary was fired, and Harvard's psychedelic research program was shut down. In 1962 Leary founded the Castalia Foundation, and in 1963 he and his colleagues founded the journal The Psychedelic Review.

Following Huxley's advice, Leary wrote a manual for LSD-usage. The Psychedelic Experience, published in 1964, is a guide for LSD-trips, written by Timothy Leary, Ralph Metzner, and Richard Alpert, loosely based on Walter Evans-Wentz's translation of the Tibetan Book of the Dead. Aldous Huxley introduced the Tibetan Book of the Dead to Timothy Leary. According to Leary, Metzner, and Alpert, the Tibetan Book of the Dead is

... a key to the innermost recesses of the human mind, and a guide for initiates, and for those who are seeking the spiritual path of liberation.

They construed the effect of LSD as a "stripping away" of ego-defenses, finding parallels between the stages of death (Note: Ego Death and Stages of Ego Death, January 11, 2022)and rebirth in the Tibetan Book of the Dead, and the stages of psychological "death" and "rebirth" which Leary had identified during his research. According to Leary, Metzner, and Alpert, it is....

...one of the oldest and most universal practices for the initiate to go through the experience of death before he can be spiritually reborn. Symbolically he must die to his past, and to his old ego, before he can take his place in the new spiritual life into which he has been initiated.

Also in 1964 Randolf Alnaes published "Therapeutic applications of the change in consciousness produced by psycholytica (LSD, Psilocybin, etc.)." Alnaes notes that patients may become involved in existential problems as a consequence of the LSD experience. Psycholytic drugs may facilitate insight. With a short psychological treatment, patients may benefit from changes brought about by the effects of the experience.

One of the LSD experiences may be the death crisis. Alnaes discerns three stages in this kind of experience:

1. Psychosomatic symptoms lead up to the "loss of ego feeling (ego death)";
2. A sense of separation of the observing subject from the body. The body is beheld to undergo death or an associated event;
3. "Rebirth", the return to normal, conscious mentation, "characteristically involving a tremendous sense of relief, which is cathartic in nature and may lead to insight".

== Timothy Leary's description of "ego-death" ==
In The Psychedelic Experience, three stages are discerned:

1. Chikhai Bardo: ego loss, a "complete transcendence" of the self and game; (Note: Leary et al.: ""Games" are behavioral sequences defined by roles, rules, rituals, goals, strategies, values, language, characteristic spacetime locations and characteristic patterns of movement.)
2. Chonyid Bardo: The Period of Hallucinations;
3. Sidpa Bardo: the return to routine game reality and the self.

Each Bardo is described in the first part of The Psychedelic Experience. In the second part, instructions are given which can be read to the "voyager". The instructions for the First Bardo state:

O (name of voyager)
The time has come for you to seek new levels of reality.
Your ego and the (name) game are about to cease.
You are about to be set face to face with the Clear Light
You are about to experience it in its reality.
In the ego−free state, wherein all things are like the void and cloudless sky,
And the naked spotless intellect is like a transparent vacuum;
At this moment, know yourself and abide in that state.
O (name of voyager),
That which is called ego−death is coming to you.
Remember:
This is now the hour of death and rebirth;
Take advantage of this temporary death to obtain the perfect state −
Enlightenment.
[...]

== Research ==
=== Neuroscience ===
The dissolution of self is observed in a number of states such as acute psychosis, temporal lobe epilepsy auras, spiritual or mystical-type experiences, and induced by psychedelic drugs such as psilocybin, LSD, ayahuasca, DMT, ketamine, or salvia divinorum. Studies into the neurobiological basis of ego-death or ego-dissolution have been useful in uncovering the brain processes behind the concept of "self". Studies utilizing psychedelics are widely due to greater control over the experimental conditions or extraneous variables; they are also useful in studying the mechanisms involved in psychiatric disorders, as psychedelic-induced states can be thought of as “psychotic experiences”.

==== Neurotransmitters ====
Most psychedelic drugs that lead to ego-death act on the serotonergic 5-HT_{2A} receptor, except ketamine which is a glutamatergic NMDA receptor antagonist. However, in all cases the mechanisms responsible for ego-dissolution seem to involve an indirect increase of glutamate.

In psychedelics targeting serotonin receptors their stimulation of 5-HT_{2A} causes a glutamate surge, primarily in layer V pyramidal neurons expressing 5-HT_{2A}receptors. The experience of ego death after psilocybin was associated with higher glutamate levels in the medial prefrontal cortex (mPFC), and lower relative glutamate concentration levels in the hippocampus.

Ketamine increases glutamate through NMDAR antagonism located on GABAergic interneurons which disinhibits (i.e., decreases their inhibition of) glutamatergic pyramidal cells, causing overall increased glutamate (this is similar to the mechanism described in the NMDAR hypofunction hypothesis of schizophrenia).

==== Brain networks ====
Medial temporal lobe (MTL) circuitry is likely involved in the disturbances of self. It was previously found that MTL is involved in visual hallucinations and depersonalisation. In drug-induced ego-death there is increased activity in MTL, and decreased connectivity between MTL and default mode network. Ego death induced by LSD was associated with overall increase in functional connectivity.

== View of spiritual traditions ==
Following the interest in psychedelics and spirituality, the term "ego death" has been used to describe the eastern notion of "enlightenment" (bodhi) or moksha.

=== Buddhism ===
Zen practice is said to lead to ego death. Ego death is also called "great death", in contrast to the physical "small death". According to Jin Y. Park, the ego death that Buddhism encourages makes an end to the "usually-unconsciousness-and-automated quest" to understand the sense-of-self as a thing, instead of as a process. According to Park, meditation is learning how to die by learning to "forget" the sense of self:

Enlightenment occurs when the usually automatized reflexivity of consciousness ceases, which is experienced as a letting-go and falling into the void and being wiped out of existence [...] [W]hen consciousness stops trying to catch its own tail, I become nothing, and discover that I am everything.

According to Welwood, "egolessness" is a common experience. Egolessness appears "in the gaps and spaces between thoughts, which usually go unnoticed". Existential anxiety arises when one realizes that the feeling of "I" is nothing more than a perception. According to Welwood, only egoless awareness allows us to face and accept death in all forms.

David Loy also mentions the fear of death, and the need to undergo ego death to realize our true nature. According to Loy, our fear of egolessness may even be stronger than our fear of death.

"Egolessness" is not the same as anatta (non-self). Where the former is more of a personal experience, Anatta is a doctrine common to all of Buddhism – describing how the constituents of a person (or any other phenomena) contain no permanent entity (one has no "essence of themself"):

the Buddha, almost ad nauseam, spoke against wrong identification with the Five Aggregates, or the same, wrong identification with the psychophysical believing it is our self. These aggregates of form, feeling, thought, inclination, and sensory consciousness, he went on to say, were illusory; they belonged to Mara the Evil One; they were impermanent and painful. And for these reasons, the aggregates cannot be our self. (Note: Zennist (January 12, 2010), The murkiness of egolessness)

=== Taoism ===
The Taoist internal martial artist Bruce Frantzis reports an experience of fear of ego annihilation, or "ru ding":

I was in Hong Kong, beginning to learn the old Yang style of Tai Chi Chaun when ru ding first struck me… It was late at night, at a still and quiet terrace on the Peak, where few people came after midnight…the park was quiet, and the moon and the sky felt as though they were descending downward, putting enormous pressure on every square inch of my skin, as I tried to lift my arms with the expansive energy of tai chi…I felt as if Chi from the moonlight, stars, and sky penetrated my body against my will. My body and mind became immensely still, as though they had dropped into a bottomless abyss, even though I was doing the rhythmic slow motion movements…At the depth of the stillness, an overwhelming, formless fear began to develop in my belly…. Then it happened: an all-consuming, paralyzing fear seemed all at once to invade every cell in my body… I knew if I kept practicing there would be nothing left of me in a few seconds… I stopped practicing… and ran down the hill praying hard that this terror would leave me…. The ego, goes into a mortal fear when the false reality of being separate from the universal life force is threatened by your consciousness having reached an awareness of connection to everything in existence. The ego spews forth all sorts of terrifying psychological and physiological reactions in the body and mind to make meditators petrified of leaving the state of separation.

=== Bernadette Roberts ===
Bernadette Roberts makes a distinction between "no ego" and "no self". According to Roberts, the falling away of the ego is not the same as the falling away of the self. "No ego" comes prior to the unitive state; with the falling away of the unitive state comes "no self". "Ego" is defined by Roberts as

... the immature self or consciousness prior to the falling away of its self-center and the revelation of a divine center.

Roberts defines "self" as

... the totality of consciousness, the entire human dimension of knowing, feeling and experiencing from the consciousness and unconsciousness to the unitive, transcendental or God-consciousness.

Ultimately, all experiences on which these definitions are based are wiped out or dissolved. Jeff Shore further explains that "no self" means "the permanent ceasing, the falling away once and for all, of the entire mechanism of reflective self-consciousness".

According to Roberts, both the Buddha and Christ embody the falling away of self, and the state of "no self". The falling away is represented by the Buddha prior to his enlightenment, starving himself by ascetic practices, and by the dying Jesus on the cross; the state of "no self" is represented by the enlightened Buddha with his serenity, and by the resurrected Christ.

=== A Course in Miracles ===
In A Course in Miracles (ACIM), it is written that "the ego's death is your life." The ego is presented as a non-entity, an illusion that ceases to exist once one lays it down: "When you have given up the illusion of the ego, you will realize that the ego never existed, and that the only thing that ever existed, and still exists, is God and His creations." Therefore, in ACIM, the ego is simply an illusion that appears to obscure one's oneness with God and his creations, not an essential part of oneself. To summarize the effects of letting go of the ego, it is written, "When the ego has been dispelled, there will be no separation, and you will be wholly real," "real" referring to being in alignment with God and how he created the reader.

== Integration after ego death experiences ==
=== Psychedelics ===
According to Nick Bromell, ego death is a tempering though frightening experience, which may lead to a reconciliation with the insight that there is no real self.

According to Grof, death crises may occur over a series of psychedelic sessions until they cease to lead to panic. A conscious effort not to panic may lead to a "pseudohallucinatory sense of transcending physical death". According to Merkur,

Repeated experience of the death crisis and its confrontation with the idea of physical death leads finally to an acceptance of personal mortality, without further illusions. The death crisis is then greeted with equanimity.

=== Vedanta and Zen ===
Both the Vedanta and the Zen Buddhist traditions warn that insight into the emptiness of the self, or so-called "enlightenment experiences", are not sufficient; further practice is necessary.

Jacobs warns that Advaita Vedanta practice takes years of committed practice to sever the "occlusion" of the so-called "vasanas, samskaras, bodily sheaths and vrittis", and the "granthi (Note: See The Knot of the Heart) or knot forming identification between Self and mind".

Zen Buddhist training does not end with kenshō, or insight into one's true nature. Practice is to be continued to deepen the insight and to express it in daily life. According to Hakuin, the main aim of "post-satori practice" (gogo no shugyo or kojo, "going beyond") is to cultivate the "Mind of Enlightenment". According to Yamada Koun, "if you cannot weep with a person who is crying, there is no kensho".

=== Dark Night and depersonalization ===
Shinzen Young, an American Buddhist teacher, has pointed at the difficulty integrating the experience of no self. He calls this "the Dark Night", or

... "falling into the Pit of the Void." It entails an authentic and irreversible insight into Emptiness and No Self. What makes it problematic is that the person interprets it as a bad trip. Instead of being empowering and fulfilling, the way Buddhist literature claims it will be, it turns into the opposite. In a sense, it's Enlightenment's Evil Twin. (Note: Sinzen Young, The Dark Night)

Willoughby Britton is conducting research on such phenomena which may occur during meditation, in a research program called "The Dark Night of the Soul". (Note: Tomas Rocha (2014), The Dark Knight of the Soul, part 1, The Atlantic) She has searched texts from various traditions to find descriptions of difficult periods on the spiritual path, (Note: Tomas Rocha (2014), The Dark Knight of the Soul, part 2, The Atlantic) and conducted interviews to find out more on the difficult sides of meditation. (Note: See also Brad Warner (June 27, 2014), Zen Freak Outs!)

== Influence ==
The propagation of LSD-induced "mystical experiences", and the concept of ego death, had some influence in the 1960s, but Leary's brand of LSD-spirituality never "quite caught on".

=== Reports of psychedelic experiences ===
Leary's terminology influenced the understanding and description of the effects of psychedelics. Various reports by hippies of their psychedelic experiences describe states of diminished consciousness which were labelled as "ego death", but do not match Leary's descriptions. Panic attacks were occasionally also labeled as "ego death".

=== The Beatles ===
John Lennon read The Psychedelic Experience, and was strongly affected by it. He wrote "Tomorrow Never Knows" after reading the book, as a guide for his LSD trips. Lennon took about a thousand acid trips, but it only exacerbated his personal difficulties. He eventually stopped using the drug. George Harrison and Paul McCartney also concluded that LSD use didn't result in any worthwhile changes.

=== Radical pluralism ===
According to Bromell, the experience of ego death confirms a radical pluralism that most people experience in their youth, but prefer to flee from, instead believing in a stable self and a fixed reality. He further states this also led to a different attitude among youngsters in the 1960s, rejecting the lifestyle of their parents as being deceitful and false.

== Controversy ==
The relationship between ego death and LSD has been disputed. Hunter S. Thompson, who tried LSD, saw a self-centered base in Leary's work, noting that Leary placed himself at the centre of his texts, using his persona as "an exemplary ego, not a dissolved one". Dan Merkur notes that the use of LSD in combination with Leary's manual often did not lead to ego death, but to horrifying bad trips.

The relationship between LSD use and enlightenment has also been criticized. Sōtō-Zen teacher Brad Warner has repeatedly criticized the idea that psychedelic experiences lead to "enlightenment experiences". (Note: See: Brad Warner (Saturday, July 09, 2011), The Psychedelic Experience; brad Warner (Wednesday, July 13, 2011), Mountain of Drugs; Brad Warner (October 9, 2012), Do Magic Mushrooms Work Like Meditation?; realitysandwich.com, Zen Trickster: A Talk with Brad Warner) In response to The Psychedelic Experience he wrote:

While I was at Starwood, I was getting mightily annoyed by all the people out there who were deluding themselves and others into believing that a cheap dose of acid, 'shrooms, peyote, "molly" or whatever was going to get them to a higher spiritual plane [...] While I was at that campsite I sat and read most of the book The Psychedelic Experience by Timothy Leary and Richard Alpert (aka Baba Ram Dass, later of Be Here Now fame). It's a book about the authors' deeply mistaken reading of the Tibetan Book of the Dead as a guide for the drug taking experience [...] It was one thing to believe in 1964 that a brave new tripped out age was about to dawn. It's quite another to still believe that now, having seen what the last 47 years have shown us about where that path leads. If you want some examples, how about Jimi Hendrix, Sid Vicious, Syd Barrett, John Entwistle, Kurt Cobain... Do I really need to get so cliched with this? Come on now. (Note: Brad Warner (Saturday, July 09, 2011), The Psychedelic Experience, hardcorezen.blogspot.nl)

The concept that ego death or a similar experience might be considered a common basis for religion has been disputed by scholars in religious studies but "has lost none of its popularity". Scholars have also criticized Leary and Alpert's attempt to tie ego death and psychedelics with Tibetan Buddhism. John Myrdhin Reynolds, has disputed Leary and Jung's use of the Evans-Wentz translation of the Tibetan Book of the Dead, arguing that it introduces a number of misunderstandings about Dzogchen. Reynolds argues that Evans-Wentz was not familiar with Tibetan Buddhism, and that his view of Tibetan Buddhism was "fundamentally neither Tibetan nor Buddhist, but Theosophical and Vedantist". Nonetheless, Reynolds confirms that the nonsubstantiality of the ego is the ultimate goal of the Hinayana system.

== See also ==
- Anattā
- Ahaṃkāra
- Altered state of consciousness
- Carlos Castaneda
- Death and Near-death experience
- Dissociative identity disorder
- Derealization
- Ego in Spiritual materialism
- Reincarnation
- Entheogenics
- Ethnomycology
- Existential crisis
- Fana (Sufism)
- Gnosis and kenosis
- Henosis
- Monism
- Mystical psychosis
- Neo-Advaita
- Night of Pan
- No-mind
- Nondualism
- Open individualism
- Parapsychology
- Psychedelic drug
- Philosophy of self
- Religious views on the self
- Self-concept
- Sotāpanna
- Śūnyatā
- Vertiginous question

== Sources ==
=== Printed sources ===
- Alnaes, Randolf (1964), "Therapeutic applications of the change in consciousness produced by psycholytica (LSD, Psilocyrin, etc.)", Acta Psychiatrica Scandinavica, 39 (S180): 397–409, doi:10.1111/j.1600-0447.1964.tb04952.x, PMID 14345225, S2CID 145300136
- Atkinson, Robert (1995), The Gift of Stories: Practical and Spiritual Applications of Autobiography, Life Stories, and Personal Mythmaking, Greenwood Publishing Group
- Bromell, Nick (2002), Tomorrow Never Knows: Rock and Psychedelics in the 1960s, University of Chicago Press
- Campbell, Joseph (1949), The Hero with a Thousand Faces, Princeton University Press
- Chapman, Rob (2010), A Very Irregular Head: The Life of Syd Barrett, Da Capo Press
- Conners, Peter (2013), White Hand Society: The Psychedelic Partnership of Timothy Leary & Allen Ginsberg, City Lights Books
- Dickins, Robert (2014), Variety of Religious Paths in Psychedelic Literature. In: J. Harold Ellens (ed.), "Seeking the Sacred with Psychoactive Substances: Chemical Paths to Spirituality and to God", ABC-CLIO
- Dourley, John P. (2008), Paul Tillich, Carl Jung and the Recovery of Religion, Routledge
- Ellens, J. Harold (2014), Seeking the Sacred with Psychoactive Substances: Chemical Paths to Spirituality and to God, ABC-CLIO
- Fordham, Michael (1990), Jungian Psychotherapy: A Study in Analytical Psychology, Karnac Books
- Gould, Jonathan (2007), Can't Buy Me Love: The Beatles, Britain, and America, Crown Publishing Group
- Grof, Stanislav (1988), The Adventure of Self-Discovery. Dimensions of Consciousness and New Perspectives in Psychotherapy and Inner Exploration, SUNY Press
- Harmless, William (2007), Mystics, Oxford University Press, ISBN 9780198041108
- Harrison, John (2010), Ego Death & Psychedelics (PDF), MAPS
- Hisamatsu, Shinʼichi (2002), Critical Sermons of the Zen Tradition: Hisamatsu's Talks on Linji, University of Hawaii Press
- Hood, Ralph W. (1975), "The Construction and Preliminary Validation of a Measure of Reported Mystical Experience", Journal for the Scientific Study of Religion, 14 (1): 29–41, doi:10.2307/1384454, JSTOR 1384454, S2CID 147200008
- Hori, Victor Sogen (2006), The Steps of Koan Practice. In: John Daido Loori, Thomas Yuho Kirchner (eds), Sitting With Koans: Essential Writings on Zen Koan Introspection, Wisdom Publications
- Jacobs, Alan (2004), "Advaita and Western Neo-Advaita", The Mountain Path Journal: 81–88, archived from the original on 2015-05-18
- Johnson, M.W.; Richards, W.A.; Griffiths, R.R. (2008), "Human hallucinogen research: guidelines for safety" (PDF), Journal of Psychopharmacology, 22 (6): 603–620, doi:10.1177/0269881108093587, PMC 3056407, PMID 18593734, archived from the original (PDF) on 2017-11-20
- Kapleau, Philip (1989), The three pillars of Zen
- Katz, Steven T. (2000), Mysticism and Sacred Scripture, Oxford University Press
- King, Richard (2002), Orientalism and Religion: Post-Colonial Theory, India and "The Mystic East", Routledge
- Kraft, Kenneth (1997), Eloquent Zen: Daitō and Early Japanese Zen, University of Hawaii Press
- Lama Surya Das (2010), Awakening To The Sacred, Random House
- Leary, Timothy; Metzner, Ralph; Alpert, Richard (1964), THE PSYCHEDELIC EXPERIENCE. A manual based on THE TIBETAN BOOK OF THE DEAD (PDF)
- Lee, Martin A.; Shlain, Bruce (1992), Acid Dreams: The Complete Social History of LSD : the CIA, the Sixties, and Beyond, Grove Press
- Leeming, David A.; Madden, Kathryn; Marlan, Stanton (2009), Encyclopedia of Psychology and Religion: L-Z, Springer Science & Business Media
- Loy, David (2000), Lack and transcendence: the problem of death and life in psychotherapy, existentialism, and Buddhism, Humanity Books
- Loy, David (2003), The Great Awakening: A Buddhist Social Theory, Wisdom Publications Inc.
- Lyvers, M.; Meester, M. (2012), "Illicit Use of LSD or Psilocybin, but not MDMA or Nonpsychedelic Drugs, is Associated with Mystical Experiences in a Dose-Dependent Manner." (PDF), Journal of Psychoactive Drugs, 44 (5): 410–417, doi:10.1080/02791072.2012.736842, PMID 23457892, S2CID 3259938
- MacInnes, Elaine (2007), The Flowing Bridge: Guidance on Beginning Zen Koans, Wisdom Publications
- Maezumi, Taizan; Glassman, Bernie (2007), The Hazy Moon of Enlightenment, Wisdom Publications
- McMahan, David L. (2008), The Making of Buddhist Modernism, Oxford: Oxford University Press, ISBN 9780195183276
- Merkur, Daniel (1998), The Ecstatic Imagination: Psychedelic Experiences and the Psychoanalysis of Self-Actualization, SUNY Press
- Merkur, Daniel (2007), Crucified with Christ: Meditations on the Passion, Mystical Death, and the Medieval : Invention of Psychotherapy, SUNY Press
- Merkur, Daniel (2014), The Formation of Hippie Spirituality: 1. Union with God. In: J. Harold Ellens (ed.), "Seeking the Sacred with Psychoactive Substances: Chemical Paths to Spirituality and to God", ABC-CLIO
- Nour, M.; Evans, L.; Nutt, D.; Carhart-Harris, R. (2016), "Ego-Dissolution and Psychedelics: Validation of the Ego-Dissolution Inventory (EDI)", Frontiers in Human Neuroscience, 10: 269, doi:10.3389/fnhum.2016.00269, PMC 4906025, PMID 27378878
- Park, Jin Y. (2006), Buddhisms and Deconstructions, Rowman & Littlefield
- Phipps, Carter (2001), "Self-Acceptance or Ego Death?", What is Enlightenment?, 17: 36–41
- Plotkin, Bill (2010), Nature and the Human Soul: Cultivating Wholeness and Community in a Fragmented World, New World Library
- Reynolds, John Myrdhin (1989), Self-Liberation Through Seeing With Naked Awareness, Station Hill Press
- Rindfleisch, Jennifer (2007), "The Death of the Ego in East-Meets-West Spirituality: Diverse Views From Prominent Authors", Zygon, 42 (1)
- Roberts, Bernadette (2004), What is self? A Study of the Spiritual Journey in Terms of Consciousness, Sentient Publications
- Rosen, David H. (1998), Archetypes of Transformation: Healing the Self/Other Split Through Active Imagination. In: Cooke et al (eds.), "The Fantastic Other: An Interface of Perspectives, Volume 11", Rodopi
- Safran, Jeremy D. (2012), Psychoanalysis and Buddhism: An Unfolding Dialogue, Wisdom Publications Inc.
- Sekida, Katsuki (1996), Two Zen Classics. Mumonkan, The Gateless Gate. Hekiganroku, The Blue Cliff Records. Translated with commentaries by Katsuki Sekida, New York / Tokyo: Weatherhill
- Shore, Jeff (2004), What is self? Foreword by Jeff Shore. In: Bernadette Roberts (2004), "What is self? A Study of the Spiritual Journey in Terms of Consciousness", Sentient Publications
- Stephenson, William (2011), Gonzo Republic: Hunter S. Thompson's America, Bloomsbury Publishing USA
- Taylor, Bron (2008), Encyclopedia of Religion and Nature, A&C Black
- Tolle, Eckhart (1999), The Power of Now, San Francisco Bay: 1997 (Namaste Publishing) 1999 (New World Library), ISBN 978-1-57731-152-2
- Ventegodt, Soren; Merrick, Joav (2003), "Measurement of Quality of Life VII. Statistical Covariation and Global Quality of Life Data: The Method of Weight-Modified Linear Regression", The Scientific World Journal, 3: 1020–1029, doi:10.1100/tsw.2003.89, PMC 5974886, PMID 14570992
- Waddell, Norman (2010), Introduction to Wild Ivy: The Spiritual Autobiography of Zen Master Hakuin, Shambhala Publications
- Welwood, John (2014), Toward a Psychology of Awakening: Buddhism, Psychotherapy, and the Path of Personal and Spiritual Transformation, Shambhala Publications
- White, Richard (2012), The Heart of Wisdom: A Philosophy of Spiritual Life, Rowman & Littlefield Publishers
- Yoshizawa, Katsuhiro (2009), The Religious Art of Zen Master Hakuin, Counterpoint Press
