= Existential crisis =

Inner conflict due to perceived meaninglessness

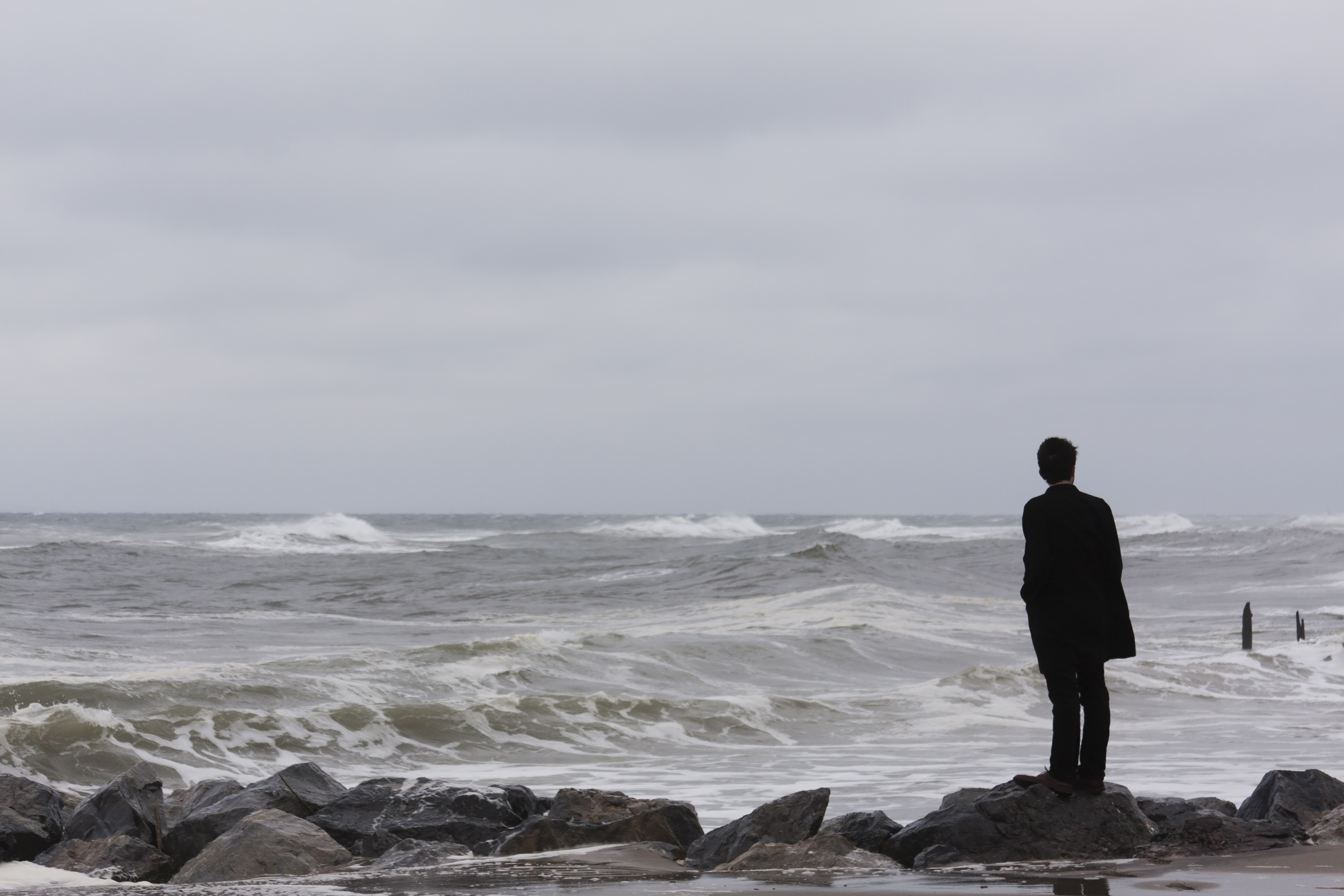
Feelings of loneliness and insignificance in the face of nature are common in existential crises.

Existential crises are inner conflicts characterized by the impression that life lacks meaning and by confusion about one's personal identity. They are accompanied by anxiety and stress, often to such a degree that they disturb one's normal functioning in everyday life and lead to depression. Their negative attitude towards meaning reflects characteristics of the philosophical movement of existentialism. The components of existential crises can be divided into emotional, cognitive, and behavioral aspects. Emotional components refer to the feelings such as emotional pain, despair, helplessness, guilt, anxiety, or loneliness. Cognitive components encompass the problem of meaninglessness, the loss of personal values or spiritual faith, and thinking about death. Behavioral components include addictions, and anti-social and compulsive behavior.

Existential crises may occur at different stages in life: the teenage crisis, the quarter-life crisis, the mid-life crisis, and the later-life crisis. Earlier crises tend to be forward-looking: the individual is anxious and confused about which path in life to follow regarding education, career, personal identity, and social relationships. Later crises tend to be backward-looking. Often triggered by the impression that one is past one's peak in life, they are usually characterized by guilt, regret, and a fear of death. If an earlier existential crisis was properly resolved, it is easier for the individual to resolve or avoid later crises. Not everyone experiences existential crises in their life.

The problem of meaninglessness plays a central role in all of these types. It can arise in the form of cosmic meaning, which is concerned with the meaning of life at large or why we are here. Another form concerns personal secular meaning, in which the individual tries to discover purpose and value mainly for their own life. Finding a source of meaning may resolve a crisis, like altruism, dedicating oneself to a religious or political cause, or finding a way to develop one's potential. Other approaches include adopting a new system of meaning, learning to accept meaninglessness, cognitive behavioral therapy, and the practice of social perspective-taking.

Negative consequences of existential crisis include anxiety and bad relationships on the personal level as well as a high divorce rate and decreased productivity on the social level. Some questionnaires, such as the Purpose in Life Test, measure whether someone is currently undergoing an existential crisis. Outside its main use in psychology and psychotherapy, the term "existential crisis" refers to a threat to the existence of something.

== Definition ==
In psychology and psychotherapy, the term "existential crisis" refers to a form of inner conflict. It is characterized by the impression that life lacks meaning and is accompanied by various negative experiences, such as stress, anxiety, despair, and depression. This often happens to such a degree that it disturbs one's normal functioning in everyday life. The inner nature of this conflict sets existential crises apart from other types of crises that are mainly due to outward circumstances, like social or financial crises. Outward circumstances may still play a role in triggering or exacerbating an existential crisis, but the core conflict happens on an inner level. The most common approach to resolving an existential crisis consists in addressing this inner conflict and finding new sources of meaning in life.

The core issue responsible for the inner conflict is the impression that the individual's desire to lead a meaningful life is thwarted by an apparent lack of meaning, also because they feel much confusion about what meaning really is, and are constantly questioning themselves. In this sense, existential crises are crises of meaning. This is often understood through the lens of the philosophical movement known as existentialism. One important aspect of many forms of existentialism is that the individual seeks to live in a meaningful way but finds themselves in a meaningless and indifferent world. The exact term "existential crisis" is not commonly found in the traditional existentialist literature in philosophy. However, various closely related technical terms are discussed, such as existential dread, existential vacuum, existential despair, existential neurosis, existential sickness, anxiety, and alienation.

Different authors focus in their definitions of existential crisis on different aspects. Some argue that existential crises are at their core crises of identity. On this view, they arise from a confusion about the question "Who am I?" and their goal is to achieve some form of clarity about oneself and one's position in the world. As identity crises, they involve intensive self-analysis, often in the form of exploring different ways of looking at oneself. They constitute a personal confrontation with certain key aspects of the human condition, like existence, death, freedom, and responsibility. In this sense, the person questions the very foundations of their life. Others emphasize the confrontation with human limitations, such as death and lack of control. Some stress the spiritual nature of existential crises by pointing out how outwardly successful people may still be severely affected by them if they lack the corresponding spiritual development.

The term "existential crisis" is most commonly used in the context of psychology and psychotherapy, but it can also be employed in a more literal sense as a crisis of existence to express that the existence of something is threatened. In this sense, a country, a company, or a social institution faces an existential crisis if political tensions, military threats, high debt, or social changes may have as a result that the corresponding entity ceases to exist.

== Components ==
Existential crises are usually seen as complex phenomena that can be understood as consisting of various components. Some approaches distinguish three types of components belonging to the fields of emotion, cognition, and behavior. Emotional aspects correspond to what it feels like to have an existential crisis. It is usually associated with emotional pain, despair, helplessness, guilt, anxiety, and loneliness. On the cognitive side, the affected are often confronted with a loss of meaning and purpose together with the realization of one's own end. Behaviorally, existential crises may express themselves in addictions and anti-social behavior, sometimes paired with ritualistic behavior, loss of relationships, and degradation of one's health. While manifestations of these three components can usually be identified in every case of an existential crisis, there are often significant differences in how they manifest. Nonetheless, it has been suggested that these components can be used to give a more unified definition of existential crises.

=== Emotional ===
On the emotional level, existential crises are associated with unpleasant experiences, such as fear, anxiety, panic, and despair. They can be categorized as a form of emotional pain whereby people lose trust and hope. This pain often manifests in the form of despair and helplessness. The despair may be caused by being unable to find meaning in life, which is associated both with a lack of motivation and the absence of inner joy. The impression of helplessness arises from being unable to find a practical response to deal with the crisis and the associated despair. This helplessness concerns specifically a form of emotional vulnerability: the individual is not just subject to a wide range of negative emotions, but these emotions often seem to be outside the person's control. This feeling of vulnerability and lack of control can itself produce further negative impressions and may lead to a form of panic or a state of deep mourning.

But on the other hand, there is also often an impression in the affected that they are in some sense responsible for their predicament. This is the case, for example, if the loss of meaning is associated with bad choices in the past for which the individual feels guilty. But it can also take the form of a more abstract type of bad conscience as existential guilt. In this case, the agent carries a vague sense of guilt that is free-floating in the sense that it is not tied to any specific wrongdoing by the agent. Especially in existential crises in the later parts of one's life, this guilt is often accompanied by a fear of death. But just as in the case of guilt, this fear may also take a more abstract form as an unspecific anxiety associated with a sense of deficiency and meaninglessness.

As crises of identity, existential crises often lead to a disturbed sense of personal integrity. This can be provoked by the apparent meaninglessness of one's life together with a general lack of motivation. Central to the sense of personal integrity are close relationships with oneself, others, and the world. The absence of meaning usually has a negative impact on these relationships. As a lack of a clear purpose, it threatens one's personal integrity and can lead to insecurity, alienation, and self-abandonment. The negative impact on one's relationships with others is often experienced as a form of loneliness.

Depending on the person and the crisis they are suffering, some of these emotional aspects may be more or less pronounced. While they are all experienced as unpleasant, they often carry within them various positive potentials as well that can push the person in the direction of positive personal development. Through the experience of loneliness, for example, the person may achieve a better understanding of the substance and importance of relationships.

=== Cognitive ===
The main cognitive aspect of existential crises is the loss of meaning and purpose. In this context, the term "meaninglessness" refers to the general impression that there is no higher significance, direction, or purpose in our actions or in the world at large. It is associated with the question of why one is doing what one is doing and why one should continue. It is a central topic in existentialist psychotherapy, which has as one of its main goals to help the patient find a proper response to this meaninglessness. In Viktor Frankl's logotherapy, for example, the term existential vacuum is used to describe this state of mind. Many forms of existentialist psychotherapy aim to resolve existential crises by assisting the patient in rediscovering meaning in their life. Closely related to meaninglessness is the loss of personal values. This means that things that seemed valuable to the individual before, like the relation to a specific person or success in their career, may now appear insignificant or pointless to them. If the crisis is resolved, it can lead to the discovery of new values.

Another aspect of the cognitive component of many existential crises concerns the attitude to one's personal end, i.e. the realization that one will die one day. While this is not new information as an abstract insight, it takes on a more personal and concrete nature when one sees oneself confronted with this fact as a concrete reality one has to face. This aspect is of particular relevance for existential crises occurring later in life or when the crisis was triggered by the loss of a loved one or by the onset of a terminal disease. For many, the issue of their own death is associated with anxiety, but it has also been argued that the contemplation of one's death may act as a key to resolving an existential crisis. The reason for this is that the realization that one's time is limited can act as a source of meaning by making the remaining time more valuable and by making it easier to discern the bigger issues that matter in contrast to smaller everyday issues that can act as distractions. Important factors for dealing with imminent death include one's religious outlook, one's self-esteem, and social integration as well as one's future prospects.

=== Behavioral ===
Existential crises can have various effects on the individual's behavior. They often lead a person to isolate themself and engage less in social interactions. For example, one's communication to one's housemates may be limited to very brief responses like a simple "yes" or "no" in order to avoid a more extended exchange or the individual reduces various forms of contact that are not strictly speaking necessary. This can result in a long-term deterioration and loss of one's relationships. In some cases, existential crises may also express themselves in overtly anti-social behavior, like hostility or aggression. These negative impulses can also be directed at the person themselves, leading to self-injury and, in the worst case, suicide.

Addictive behavior is also seen in people going through an existential crisis. Some turn to drugs in order to lessen the impact of the negative experiences whereas others hope to learn through the non-ordinary drug experiences to cope with the existential crisis. While this type of behavior can succeed in providing a short-term relief of the effects of the existential crisis, it has been argued that it is usually maladaptive and fails on the long-term level. This way, the crises may even be further exacerbated. For the affected, it is often difficult to distinguish the need for pleasure and power from the need for meaning, thereby leading them on a wrong track in their efforts to resolve the crisis. The addictions themselves or the stress associated with existential crises can result in various health problems, ranging from high blood pressure to long-term organ damage and increased likelihood of cancer.

Existential crises may also be accompanied by ritualistic behavior. In some cases, this can have positive effects to help the affected transition to a new outlook on life. But it might also take the form of compulsive behavior that acts more as a distraction than as a step towards a solution. Another positive behavioral aspect concerns the tendency to seek therapy. This tendency reflects the awareness of the affected of the gravity of the problem and their desire to resolve it.

== Types ==
Different types of existential crises are often distinguished based on the time in one's life when they occur. This approach rests on the idea that, depending on one's stage in life, individuals are faced with different issues connected to meaning and purpose. They lead to different types of crises if these issues are not properly resolved. The stages are usually tied to rough age groups but this correspondence is not always accurate since different people of the same age group may find themselves in different life situations and different stages of development. Being aware of these differences is central for properly assessing the issue at the core of a specific crisis and finding a corresponding response to resolve it.

The most well-known existential crisis is the mid-life crisis and a lot of research is directed specifically at this type of crisis. But researchers have additionally discovered various other existential crises belonging to different types. There is no general agreement about their exact number and periodization. Because of this, the categorizations of different theorists do not always coincide but they have significant overlaps. One categorization distinguishes between the early teenage crisis, the sophomore crisis, the adult crisis, the mid-life crisis, and the later-life crisis. Another focuses only on the sophomore crisis, the adult crisis, and the later-life crisis but defines them in wider terms. The sophomore crisis and the adult crisis are often treated together as forms of the quarter-life crisis.

There is wide agreement that the earlier crises tend to be more forward-looking and are characterized by anxiety and confusion about the path in life one wants to follow. The later crises, on the other hand, are more backward-looking, often in the form of guilt and regrets, while also concerned with the problem of one's own mortality.

These different crises can affect each other in various ways. For example, if an earlier crisis was not properly resolved, later crises may impose additional difficulties for the affected. Even if an earlier crisis was fully resolved, this does not guarantee that later crises will be successfully resolved or avoided altogether.

Another approach distinguishes existential crises based on their intensity. Some theorists use the terms existential vacuum and existential neurosis to refer to different degrees of existential crisis. On this view, an existential vacuum is a rather common phenomenon characterized by the frequent recurrence of subjective states like boredom, apathy, and emptiness. Some people experience this only in their free time but are otherwise not troubled by it. The term "Sunday neurosis" is often used in this context. An existential vacuum becomes an existential neurosis if it is paired with overt clinical neurotic symptoms, such as depression or alcoholism.

=== Teenage ===
The early teenage crisis involves the transition from childhood to adulthood and is centered around the issue of developing one's individuality and independence. This concerns specifically the relation to one's family and often leads to spending more time with one's peers instead. Various rebellious and anti-social behavior seen sometimes in this developmental stage, like stealing or trespassing, may be interpreted as attempts to achieve independence. It can also give rise to a new type of conformity concerning, for example, how the teenager dresses or behaves. This conformity tends to be not in relation to one's family or public standards but to one's peer group or adored celebrities. But this may be seen as a temporary step in order to distance oneself from previously accepted standards with later steps emphasizing one's independence also from one's peer group and celebrity influences. A central factor for resolving the early teenage crisis is that meaning and purpose are found in one's new identity since independence without it can result in the feeling of being lost and may lead to depression. Another factor pertains to the role of the parents. By looking for signs of depression, they may become aware that a teenager is going through a crisis. Examples include a change of appetite, sleep behavior is different; sleeps more or less, grades take a dive in a short amount of time, they are less social and more isolated, and start to become easily irritated. If parents regularly talk to their teenagers and ask them questions, it is more likely that they detect the presence of a crisis.

=== Quarter-life, sophomore, and adult ===
The term "quarter-life crisis" is often used to refer to existential crises occurring in early adulthood, i.e. roughly during the ages between 18 and 30. Some authors distinguish between two separate crises that may occur at this stage in life: the sophomore crisis and the adult crisis. The sophomore crisis affects primarily people in their late teenage years or their early 20s. It is also referred to as "sophomore slump", specifically when it affects students. It is the first time that serious questions about the meaning of life and one's role in the world are formulated. At this stage, these questions have a direct practical relation to one's future. They apply to what paths one wants to choose in life, like which career to focus on and how to form successful relationships. At the center of the sophomore crisis is the anxiety over one's future, i.e. how to lead one's life and how to best develop and employ one's abilities. Existential crisis often specifically affect high achievers who fear that they do not reach their highest potential since they lack a secure plan for the future. To solve them, it is necessary to find meaningful answers to these questions. Such answers may result in practical commitments and can inform later life decisions. Some people who have already made their career choices at a very early age may never experience a sophomore crisis. But such decisions can lead to problems later on since they are usually mainly informed by the outlook of one's social environment and less by the introspective insight into one's individual preferences. If there turns out to be a big discrepancy between the two, it can provoke a more severe form of the sophomore crisis later on. James Marcia defines this early commitment without sufficient exploration as identity foreclosure.

The adult crisis usually starts in the mid- to late 20s. The issues faced in it overlap to some extent with the ones in the sophomore crisis, but they tend to be more complex issues of identity. As such, they also circle around one's career and one's path in life. But they tend to take more details into account, like one's choice of religion, one's political outlook, or one's sexuality. Resolving the adult crisis means having a good idea of who one is as a person and being comfortable with this idea. It is usually associated with reaching full adulthood, having completed school, working full-time, having left one's home, and being financially independent. Being unable to resolve the adult crisis may result in disorientation, a lack of confidence in one's personal identity, and depression.

=== Mid-life ===
Among the different types of existential crises, the mid-life crisis is the one most widely discussed. It often sets in around the age of 40 and can be triggered by the impression that one's personal growth is obstructed. This may be combined with the sense that there is a significant distance between one's achievement and one's aspirations. In contrast to the earlier existential crises, it also involves a backward-looking component: previous choices in life are questioned and their meaning for one's achievements are assessed. This may lead to regrets and dissatisfaction with one's life choices on various topics, such as career, partner, children, social status, or missed opportunities. The tendency to look backward is often connected to the impression that one is past one's peak period in life.

Sometimes five intermediary stages are distinguished: accommodation, separation, liminality, reintegration, and individuation. In these stages, the individual first adapts to changed external demands, then addresses the distance between their innate motives and the external persona, next rejects their previously adaptive persona, later adopts their new persona, and lastly becomes aware of the external consequences associated with these changes.

Mid-life crises can be triggered by specific events such as losing a job, forced unemployment, extramarital affairs, separation, death of a loved one, or health problems. In this sense, the mid-life crisis can be understood as a period of transition or reevaluation in which the individual tries to adapt to their changed situation in life, both in response to the particular triggering event and to the more general changes that come with age.

Various symptoms are associated with mid-life crises, such as stress, boredom, self-doubt, compulsivity, changes in the libido and sexual preferences, rumination, and insecurity. In public discourse, the mid-life crisis is primarily associated with men, often in direct relation to their career. But it affects women just as well. An additional factor here is the limited time left in their reproductive period or the onset of the menopause. Between 8 and 25 percent of Americans over the age of thirty-five have experienced a mid-life crisis.

Both the severity and the length of the mid-life crisis are often affected by whether and how well the earlier crises were resolved. People who managed to resolve earlier crises well tend to feel more fulfilled with their life choices, which also reflects in how their meaningfulness is perceived when looking back on them. But it does not ensure that they still appear meaningful from one's current perspective.

=== Later-life ===
The later-life crisis often occurs around one's late 60s. It may be triggered by events such as retirement, the death of a loved one, serious illness, or imminent death. At its core is a backward-looking reflection on how one led one's life and the choices one made. This reflection is usually motivated by a desire to have lived a valuable and meaningful life paired with an uncertainty of one's success. A contemplation of one's past wrongdoings may also be motivated by a desire to find a way to make up for them while one still can. It can also express itself in a more theoretical form as trying to assess whether one's life made a positive impact on one's more immediate environment or the world at large. This is often associated with the desire to leave a positive and influential legacy behind.

Because of its backward-looking nature, there may be less one can do to truly resolve the crisis. This is true especially for people who arrive at a negative assessment of their life. An additional impeding factor in contrast to earlier crises is that individuals are often unable to find the energy and youthfulness necessary to make meaningful changes to their lives. Some suggest that developing an acceptance of the reality of death may help in the process. Other suggestions focus less on outright resolving the crisis but more on avoiding or minimizing its negative impact. Recommendations to this end include looking after one's physical, economic, and emotional well-being as well as developing and maintaining a social network of support. The best way to avoid the crisis as much as possible may be to ensure that one's earlier crises in life are resolved.

== Meaninglessness ==
Most theorists see meaninglessness as the central issue around which existential crises revolve. In this sense, they may be understood as crises of meaning. The issue of meaning and meaninglessness concerns various closely related questions. Understood in the widest sense, it involves the global questions of the meaning of life in general, why we are here, or for what purpose we live. Answers to this question traditionally take the form of religious explanations, for example, that the world was created by God according to His purpose and that each thing is meaningful because it plays a role for this higher purpose. This is sometimes termed cosmic meaning in contrast to the secular personal meaning an individual seeks when asking in what way their particular life is meaningful or valuable. In this personal sense, it is often connected with a practical confusion about how one should live one's life or why one should continue doing what one does. This can express itself in the feeling that one has nothing to live for or to hope for. Sometimes this is even interpreted in the sense that there is no right and wrong or good and evil. While it may be more and more difficult in the contemporary secular world to find cosmic meaning, it has been argued that to resolve the problem of meaninglessness, it is sufficient for the individual to find a secular personal meaning to hold onto.

The issue of meaninglessness becomes a problem because humans seem to have a strong desire or need for meaning. This expresses itself both emotionally and practically since goals and ideals are needed to structure one's life. The other side of the problem is given in the fact that there seems to be no such meaning or that the world is at its bottom contingent and could have existed in a very different way or not at all. The world's contingency and indifference to human affairs are often referred to as the absurd (or absurdism) in the existentialist literature. The problem can be summarized through the question "How does a being who needs meaning find meaning in a universe that has no meaning?". Various practitioners of existential psychotherapy have affirmed that the loss of meaning plays a role for the majority of people requiring psychotherapy and is the central issue for a significant number of them. But this loss has its most characteristic expression in existential crises.

Various factors affect whether life is experienced as meaningful, such as social relationships, religion, and thoughts about the past or future. Judgments of meaning are quite subjective. They are a form of global assessment since they take one's life as a whole into consideration. It is sometimes argued that the problem of a loss of meaning is particularly associated with modern society. This is often based on the idea that people tended to be more grounded in their immediate social environment, their profession, and their religion in premodern times.

=== Sources of meaning ===
It is usually held that humans have a need for meaning. This need may be satisfied by finding an accessible source of meaning. Religious faith can be a source of meaning and many studies demonstrate that it is associated with self-reported meaning in life. Another important source of meaning is due to one's social relationships. Lacking or losing a source of meaning, on the other hand, often leads to an existential crisis. In some cases, this change is clearly linked to a specific source of meaning that becomes inaccessible. For example, a religious person confronted with the vast extent of death and suffering may find their faith in a benevolent, omnipotent God shattered and thereby lose the ability to find meaning in life. For others, a concrete threat of imminent death, for example, due to the disruption of the social order, can have a similar effect. If the individual is unable to assimilate, reinterpret, or ignore this type of threatening information, the loss of their primary source of meaning may force them to reevaluate their system of meaning in life from the ground up. In this case, the person is entering an existential crisis, which can bring with it the need to question what other sources of meaning are accessible to them or whether there is meaning at all. Many different sources of meaning are discussed in the academic literature. Discovering such a source for oneself is often key to resolving an existential crisis. The sources discussed in the literature can be divided into altruism, dedication to a cause, creativity, hedonism, self-actualization, and finding the right attitude.

Altruism refers to the practice or attitude based on the desire to benefit others. Altruists aim to make the world a better place than they found it. This can happen in various ways. On a small scale, one may try to be kinder to the people in one's immediate social environment. It can include the effort to become aware of their problems and try to help them, directly or indirectly. But the altruistic attitude may also express itself in a less personal form towards strangers, for example, by donating money to charities. Effective altruism is an example of a contemporary movement promoting altruism and providing concrete advice on how to live altruistically. It has been argued that altruism can be a strong source of meaning in one's life. This is also reflected in the fact that altruists tend to enjoy higher levels of well-being as well as increased physical and mental health.

Dedicating oneself to a cause can act as a closely related source of meaning. In many cases, the two overlap, if altruism is the primary motivation. But this is not always the case since the fascination with a cause may not be explicitly linked to the desire to benefit others. It consists in devoting oneself fully to producing something greater than oneself. A diverse set of causes can be followed this way, ranging from religious goals, political movements, or social institutions to scientific or philosophical ventures. Such causes provide meaning to one's life to the extent that one participates in the meaningfulness of the cause by working towards it and realizing it.

Creativity refers to the activity of creating something new and exciting. It can act as a source of meaning even if it is not obvious that the creation serves a specific purpose. This aspect is especially relevant in the field of art, where it is sometimes claimed that the work of art does not need an external justification since it is "its own excuse for being". It has been argued that for many great artists, their keener vision of the existential dilemma of the human condition was the cause of their creative efforts. These efforts in turn may have served them as a form of therapy. But creativity is not limited to art. It can be found and practiced in many different fields, both on a big and a small scale, such as in science, cooking, gardening, writing, regular work, or romantic relationships.

The hedonistic approach can also constitute a source of meaning. It is based on the idea that a life enjoyed to the fullest extent is meaningful even if it lacks any higher overarching purpose. For this perspective, it is relevant that hedonism is not understood in a vulgar sense, i.e. as the pursuit of sensory pleasures characterized by a disregard of the long-term consequences. While such a lifestyle may be satisfying in certain respects, a more refined form of hedonism that includes other forms of pleasures and considers their long-term consequences is more commonly recommended in the academic literature. This wider sense also includes more subtle pleasures such as looking at fine art or engaging in a stimulating intellectual conversation. In this way, life can be meaningful to the individual if it is seen as a gift evoking a sense of astonishment at its miracle and a general appreciation of it.

According to the perspective of self-actualization, each human carries within themselves a potential of what they may become. The purpose of life then is to develop oneself to realize this potential and successfully doing so increases the individual's well-being and sense of meaningfulness. In this sense, just like an acorn has the potential to become an oak, so an infant has the potential to become a fully actualized adult with various virtues and skills based on their inborn talents. The process of self-actualization is sometimes understood in terms of a hierarchy: certain lower potentials have to be actualized before the actualization of higher potentials becomes possible.

Most of the approaches mentioned so far have clear practical implications in that they affect how the individual interacts with the world. The attitudinal approach, on the other hand, identifies different sources of meaning based only on taking the right attitude towards life. This concerns specifically negative situations in which one is faced with a fate that one cannot change. In existential crises, this often expresses itself in the feeling of helplessness. The idea is that in such situations one can still find meaning based on taking a virtuous or admirable attitude towards one's suffering, for example, by remaining courageous.

Whether a certain source of meaning is accessible differs from person to person. It may also depend on the stage in life one finds oneself in, similar to how different stages are often associated with different types of existential crises. It has been argued, for example, that the concern with oneself and one's own well-being found in self-actualization and hedonism tends to be associated more with earlier stages in life. The concern with others or the world at large found in altruism and the dedication to a cause, on the other hand, is more likely found in later stages in life, for example, when an older generation aims to pass on their knowledge and improve the lives of a younger generation.

== Consequences, clinical manifestation, and measurement ==
Going through an existential crisis is associated with a variety of consequences, both for the affected individual and their social environment. On the personal level, the immediate effects are usually negative since experiencing an existential crisis is connected to stress, anxiety, and the formation of bad relationships. This can lead all the way to depression if existential crises are not resolved. On the social level, they cause a high divorce rate and an increased number of people being unable to make significant positive contributions to society, for example, due to a lack of drive resulting from depression. But if resolved properly, they can also have positive effects by pushing the affected to address the underlying issue. Individuals may thereby find new sources of meaning, develop as a person, and thereby improve their way of life. In the sophomore crisis, for example, this can happen by planning ahead and thereby making more conscious choices in how to lead one's life.

Being aware of the symptoms and consequences of existential crises on the personal level is important for psychotherapists so they can arrive at an accurate diagnosis. But this is not always easy since the symptoms usually differ from person to person. In this sense, the lack of meaning at the core of existential crises can express itself in several different ways. For some, it may lead them to become overly adventurous and zealous. In their attempt to wrest themselves free from meaninglessness, they are desperate to indiscriminately dedicate themselves to any cause. They might do so without much concern for the concrete content of the cause or for their personal safety. It has been argued that this type of behavior is present in some hardcore activists. This may be understood as a form of defense mechanism in which the individual engages fanatically in activities in response to a deep sense of purposelessness. It can also express itself in a related but less dramatic way as compulsive activity. This may take various forms, such as workaholism or the obsessive pursuit of prestige, or material acquisitions. This is sometimes referred to as false centering or inauthenticity since the activity is pursued more as a distraction and less because it is in itself fulfilling to the agent. It can provide a temporary alleviation by helping the individual drain their energy and thus distract them from the threat of meaninglessness.

Another response consists in an overt declaration of nihilism characterized by a pervasive tendency to discredit activities purported by others to have meaning. Such an individual may, for example, dismiss altruism out of hand as a disingenuous form of selfishness or see all leaders as motivated by their lust for power rather than inspired by a grand vision. In some more extreme forms of crisis, the individual's behavior may show severe forms of aimlessness and apathy, often accompanied by depression. Being unable to find good reasons for making an effort, such a person remains inactive for extended periods of time, such as staying in bed all day. If they engage in a behavior, they may do so indiscriminately without much concern for what they are doing.

Indirect factors for determining the severeness of an existential crisis include job satisfaction and the quality of one's relationships. For example, physical violence or constant fighting in a relationship may be interpreted as external signs of a serious existential crisis. Various empirical studies have shown that a lack of sense of meaning in life is associated with psychopathology. Having a positive sense of meaning, on the other hand, is associated with deeply held religious beliefs, having a clear life goal, and having dedicated oneself to a cause.

=== Measurement ===
Different suggestions have been made concerning how to measure whether someone has an existential crisis, to what degree it is present, and which approach to resolving it might be promising. These methods can help therapists and counselors to understand both whether their client is going through an existential crisis and, if so, how severe their crisis is. But they can also be used by theorists in order to identify how existential crises correlate with other phenomena, such as depression, gender, or poverty.

One way to assess this is through questionnaires focusing on topics like the meaning of life, such as the Purpose in Life Test and the Life Regard Index. The Purpose in Life Test is widely used and consists of 20 items rated on a seven-point scale, such as "In life I have: (1) no goals or aims at all ... (7) very clear goals and aims" or "With regard to death, I am (1) unprepared and frightened ... (7) prepared and unafraid".

== Resolution ==
Since existential crises can have a crippling effect on people, it is important to find ways to resolve them. Different forms of resolution have been proposed. The right approach often depends on the type of crisis experienced. Many approaches emphasize the importance of developing a new stage of intellectual functioning in order to resolve the inner conflict. But others focus more on external changes. For example, crises related to one's sexual identity and one's level of independence may be resolved by finding a partner matching one's character and preferences. Positive indicators of marital success include having similar interests, engaging in common activities, and having a similar level of education. Crises centering around one's professional path may also be approached more externally by finding the right type of career. In this respect, important factors include that the career matches both one's interests and one's skills to avoid a job that is unfulfilling, lacks engagement, or is overwhelming.

But the more common approach aims at changing one's intellectual functioning and inner attitude. Existential psychotherapists, for example, usually try to resolve existential crises by helping the patient to rediscover meaning in their life. Sometimes this takes the form of finding a spiritual or religious purpose in life, such as dedicating oneself to an ideal or discovering God. Other approaches focus less on the idea of discovering meaning and more on the idea of creating meaning. This is based on the idea that meaning is not something independent of the agent but something that has to be created and maintained. However, there are also types of existentialist psychotherapy that accept the idea that the world is meaningless and try to develop the best way of coping with this fact. The different approaches to resolving the issue of meaninglessness are sometimes divided into a leap of faith, the reasoned approach, and nihilism. Another classification categorizes possible resolutions as isolation, anchoring, distraction, and sublimation. Methods from cognitive behavior therapy have also been used to treat existential crises by bringing about a change in the individual's intellectual functioning.

=== Leap of faith, reasoned approach, and nihilism ===
Since existential crises circle around the idea of being unable to find meaning in life, various resolutions focus specifically on this aspect. Sometimes three different forms of this approach are distinguished. On the one hand, the individual may perform a leap of faith and affirm a new system of meaning without a previous in-depth understanding of how secure it is as a source of meaning. Another method consists in carefully considering all the relevant factors and thereby rebuilding and justifying a new system of meaning. A third approach goes against these two by denying that there is actual meaning. It consists in accepting the meaninglessness of life and learning how to deal with it without the illusion of meaning.

A leap of faith implies committing oneself to something one does not fully understand. In the case of existential crises, the commitment involves the faith that life is meaningful even though the believer lacks a reasoned justification. This leap is motivated by the strong desire that life is meaningful and triggered as a response to the threat posed to the fulfillment of this desire by the existential crisis. For whom this is psychologically possible, this may be the fastest way to bypass an existential crisis. This option may be more available to people oriented toward intuitive processing and less to people who favor a more rational approach since it has less need for a thorough reflection and introspection. It has been argued that the meaning acquired through a leap of faith may be more robust than in other cases. One reason for this is that since it is not based on empirical evidence for it, it is also less vulnerable to empirical evidence against it. Another reason concerns the flexibility of intuition to selectively disregard threatening information on the one hand and to focus instead on validating cues.

More rationally inclined persons tend to focus more on a careful evaluation of the sources of meaning based on solid justification through empirical evidence. If successful, this approach has the advantage of providing the individual with a concrete and realistic understanding of how their life is meaningful. It can also constitute a very robust source of meaning if it is based on solid empirical evidence and thorough understanding. The system of meaning arrived at may be very idiosyncratic by being based on the individual's values, preferences, and experiences. On a practical level, it often leads to a more efficient realization of this meaning since the individual can focus more exclusively on this factor. If someone determines that family life is their main source of meaning, for example, they may focus more intensely on this aspect and take a less involved stance towards other areas in life, such as success at work. In comparison to the leap of faith, this approach offers more room for personal growth due to the cognitive labor in the form of reflection and introspection involved in it and the self-knowledge resulting from this process. One of the drawbacks of this approach is that it can take a considerable amount of time to complete and rid oneself of the negative psychological consequences. If successful, the foundations arrived at this way may provide a solid basis to withstand future existential crises. But success is not certain and even after a prolonged search, the individual might still be unable to identify a significant source of meaning in their life.

If the search for meaning in either way fails, there is still another approach to resolving the issue of meaninglessness in existential crises: to find a way to accept that life is meaningless. This position is usually referred to as nihilism. One can distinguish a local and a global version of this approach, depending on whether the denial of meaningfulness is only directed at a certain area of life or at life as a whole. It becomes necessary if the individual arrives at the justifiable conclusion that life is, after all, meaningless. This conclusion may be intolerable initially, since humans seem to have a strong desire to lead a meaningful life, sometimes referred to as the will to meaning. Some theorists, such as Viktor Frankl, see this desire even as the primary motivation of all individuals. One difficulty with this negative stance towards meaning is that it seems to provide very little practical guidance in how to live one's life. So even if an individual has resolved their existential crises this way, they may still lack an answer to the question of what they should do with their life. Positive aspects of this stance include that it can lead to a heightened sense of freedom by being unbound from any predetermined purpose. It also exemplifies the virtue of truthfulness by being able to acknowledge an inconvenient truth instead of escaping into the convenient illusion of meaningfulness.

=== Isolation, anchoring, distraction, and sublimation ===
According to Peter Wessel Zapffe, life is essentially meaningless but this does not mean that we are automatically doomed to unresolvable existential crises. Instead, he identifies four ways of dealing with this fact without falling into an existential depression: isolation, anchoring, distraction, and sublimation. Isolation involves a dismissal of destructive thoughts and feelings from consciousness. Physicians and medical students, for example, may adopt a detached and technical stance in order to better deal with the tragic and disgusting aspects of their vocation. Anchoring involves a dedication to certain values and practical commitments that give the individual a sense of assurance. This often happens collectively, for example, through devotion to a common religion, but it can also happen individually. Distraction is a more temporary form of withdrawing one's attention from the meaninglessness of certain life situations that do not provide any significant contributions to the construction of our self. Sublimation is the rarest of these mechanisms. Its essential characteristic setting it apart from the other mechanisms is that it uses the pain of living and transforms it into a work of art or another creative expression.

=== Cognitive behavioral therapy and social perspective-taking ===
Some approaches from the field of cognitive behavioral therapy adjust and employ treatments for depression to resolve existential crises. One fundamental idea in cognitive behavior theory is that various psychological problems arise due to inaccurate core beliefs about oneself, such as beliefs that one is worthless, helpless, or incompetent. These problematic core beliefs may lie dormant for extended periods. But when activated by certain life events, they may express themselves in the form of recurrent negative and damaging thoughts. This can lead, among other things, to depression. Cognitive behavioral therapy then consists in raising the awareness of the affected person in regards to these toxic thought patterns and the underlying core beliefs while training to change them. This can happen by focusing on one's immediate present, being goal-oriented, role-playing, or behavioral experiments.

A closely related method employs the practice of social perspective-taking. Social perspective-taking involves the ability to assess one's situation and character from the point of view of a different individual. This enables the individual to step outside their own immediate perspective while taking into consideration how others see the individual and thus reach a more integral perspective.

=== Unresolved crises ===
Existential crises sometimes pass even if the underlying issue is not resolved. This may happen, for example, if the issue is pushed into the background by other concerns and thus remains present only in a masked or dormant state. Even in this state, it may have unconscious effects on how people lead their life, like career choices. It can also increase the likelihood of suffering another existential crisis later in life and might make resolving these later crises more difficult. It has been argued that many existential crises in contemporary society are not resolved. The reason for this may be a lack of clear awareness of the nature, importance, and possible treatments of existential crises.

== Cultural context ==
In the 19th century, Thomas Carlyle wrote of how the loss of faith in God results in an existential crisis which he called the "Centre of Indifference", wherein the world appears cold and unfeeling and the individual considers himself to be without worth. Søren Kierkegaard considered that angst and existential despair would appear when an inherited or borrowed world-view (often of a collective nature) proved unable to handle unexpected and extreme life-experiences. Friedrich Nietzsche extended his views to suggest that the death of God—the loss of collective faith in religion and traditional morality—created a more widespread existential crisis for the philosophically aware.

Existential crisis has indeed been seen as the inevitable accompaniment of modernism (circa 1890–1945). Whereas Émile Durkheim saw individual crises as the by-product of social pathology and a (partial) lack of collective norms, others have seen existentialism as arising more broadly from the modernist crisis of the loss of meaning throughout the modern world. Its twin answers were either a religion revivified by the experience of anomie (as with Martin Buber), or an individualistic existentialism based on facing directly the absurd contingency of human fate within a meaningless and alien universe, as with Sartre and Camus.

Irvin Yalom, an emeritus professor of psychiatry at Stanford University, has made fundamental contributions to the field of existential psychotherapy. Rollo May is another of the founders of this approach.

Fredric Jameson has suggested that postmodernism, with its saturation of social space by a visual consumer culture, has replaced the modernist angst of the traditional subject, and with it the existential crisis of old, by a new social pathology of flattened affect and a fragmented subject.

== Historical context ==
Existential crises are often seen as a phenomenon associated specifically with modern society. One important factor in this context is that various sources of meaning, such as religion or being grounded in one's local culture and immediate social environment, are less important in the contemporary context.

Another factor in modern society is that individuals are faced with a daunting number of decisions to make and alternatives to choose from, often without any clear guidelines on how to make these choices. The high difficulty for finding the best alternative and the importance of doing so are often the cause of anxiety and may lead to an existential crisis. For example, it was very common for a long time in history for a son to simply follow his father's profession. In contrast to this, the modern schooling system presents students with different areas of study and interest, thereby opening a wide range of career opportunities to them. The problem brought about by this increased freedom is sometimes referred to as the agony of choice. The increased difficulty is described in Barry Schwartz's law, which links the costs, time, and energy needed to make a well-informed choice to the number of alternatives available.

== See also ==
- Absurdism
- Why is there anything at all?
- Antinatalism
- "Dark Night of the Soul"
- Depersonalization
- Duḥkha
- Ego death
- Limit situation
- Scholarly approaches to mysticism
- Positive disintegration
- The Sickness unto Death
- Spiritual crisis
