= Etta Deikman =

American artist

Etta Deikman is an American artist whose works embrace abstract art. She was born in New York and currently lives and works in Mill Valley, California.

== Life and work ==
Etta Deikman studied with both Hans Hoffman and Willem de Kooning. She is a graduate of Black Mountain College, and attended contemporaneously with Merce Cunningham and John Cage.

Her career began in the 1950s and she has produced artistic pieces since. She has received a number of grants for her work, including one from the Mann Arts Council for the San Francisco Foundation.

Photographs and reviews of her work have appeared in (among numerous others) Artweek Magazine on several occasions, Pacific Sun (1/18/95, 6/83, 7/21/78), and earlier in her career in The New York Times (5/4/61) and The Washington Post (2/1959 and 4/1959).

Etta was married to psychiatrist and author Dr. Arthur Deikman until his death in 2013.
