= Arthur J. Deikman =

American psychiatrist (1929–2013)

- Born: September 27, 1929; New York City, U.S.
- Died: September 2, 2013 (aged 83); Mill Valley, California, U.S.
- Education: Harvard College; Harvard Medical School
- Known for: The Wrong Way Home: Uncovering the Patterns of Cult Behavior in American Society
- Scientific career
- Fields: Psychiatry
- Workplaces: University of California, San Francisco

Arthur J. Deikman (September 27, 1929 – September 2, 2013) was an American physician who was a clinical professor of psychiatry at the University of California, San Francisco, and a member of the editorial board of the Journal of Humanistic Psychology and Human Givens. He was also a contributor to The Journal of Nervous and Mental Disease.

== Life and work ==
Born in New York City as the son of a businessman and raised in Long Island, Deikman studied physics at Harvard University. He then moved to mathematics, and then to pre-med classes. He traces his choice of psychiatry to an encounter with a doctor who gave him a physical exam prior to his entry to Harvard Medical School: "When I told him I liked Rilke and Yeats, he told me I was going to be a psychiatrist. It gave me the most freedom. I could get research grants because anything could be considered part of the mind." On a two-month summer vacation which he spent camping alone in the Adirondacks, another experience occurred that was to determine the direction his life took: "I sat on a rock by a lake and tried to get closer to what I felt in music and poetry. After two weeks of that, colors became brighter. Something emanated from the sky and trees. I knew other people weren't experiencing it. This seemed very important."

"So habitual is the trance of ordinary life that one could say that human beings are a race that sleeps and awakens, but does not awaken fully. Because half-awake is sufficient for the task we customarily do, few of us are aware of the dysfunction of our condition."

— Arthur J. Deikman

Intrigued by this altered awareness, Deikman became a pioneering investigator of mystical states in the 1950s and in the following decade created a humane form of psychotherapeutic treatment for patients with psychosis. He also became a student of zen meditation under Suzuki Roshi, of Sufism under Idries Shah, and explored the Human Potential Movement with Esalen leaders George Leonard and Michael Murphy.

In the early 1970s, Deikman famously identified the syndrome of "mystical psychosis" to characterize first-person accounts of psychotic experiences that are strikingly similar to reports of mystical experiences. According to Deikman, psychotic experience need not be considered pathological, especially if consideration is given to the values and beliefs of the individual concerned. Deikman thought the mystical experience was brought about through a "deautomatization" or undoing of habitual psychological structures that organize, limit, select, and interpret perceptual stimuli, possible causes of such deautomatization including exposure to severe stress, substance abuse or withdrawal, and mood disorders.

Deikman took part in a one-year research seminar on new religious movements in order to gain a better understanding of the attraction these movements had exercised on many Americans in the 1960s and 1970s. In 1990, he wrote The Wrong Way Home: Uncovering the Patterns of Cult Behavior in American Society. Deikman observed that "behavior similar to that which takes place in extreme cults takes place in all of us," and suggested that "the longing for parents persists into adulthood and results in cult behavior that pervades normal society."

Arthur J. Deikman died on September 2, 2013, at his home in Mill Valley, CA after "a brave and patient encounter" with Parkinson's disease. At his side (since the 1950s) was his wife, abstract artist Etta Deikman.

== Education ==
- Harvard College
- Harvard Medical School
- Board Certified, Psychiatry, Neurology, American Board of Psychiatry and Neurology

== Published works ==
=== Books ===
- Personal Freedom: On Finding Your Way to the Real World, 1976
- The Observing Self, 1983
- Evaluating Spiritual and Utopian Groups, 1988
- The Wrong Way Home: Uncovering the Patterns of Cult Behavior in American Society, 1990
- Them and Us: Cult Thinking and the Terrorist Threat, 2003, excerpted

=== Articles ===
- Arthur Deikman on Mystic Experience, "Mystic Experience and Two Modes of Consciousness", adapted from the work of Arthur J. Deikman, M.D.
- Article, Journal of Consciousness Studies, 1996
- I = Awareness, Journal of Consciousness Studies, 3 (4), pp. 350–6.
- Spirituality Expands a Therapist's Horizons
- "The Evaluation of Spiritual and Utopian Groups". Journal of Humanistic Psychology. 23 (3). SAGE Publications: 8–18. 1983. doi:10.1177/0022167883233002. ISSN 0022-1678. S2CID 145692316.
- Treating Former Members of Cults
