= Journal of Humanistic Psychology =

- Discipline: Psychology
- Language: English
- Edited by: Shawn Rubin

Publication details
- History: 1961-present
- Publisher: SAGE Publications
- Frequency: Bi-monthly
- Impact factor: 0.614 (2017)

Standard abbreviations
- ISO 4: J. Humanist. Psychol.

Indexing
- ISSN: 0022-1678 (print); 1552-650X (web)
- LCCN: 66098467
- OCLC no.: 1783229

Links
- Journal homepage; Online access; Online archive

Journal of Humanistic Psychology is a peer-reviewed academic journal that publishes papers in the field of Psychology. The journal's editor is Sarah R. Kamens. It has been in publication since 1961 and is currently published by SAGE Publications. Former editors of the journal include Thomas Greening.

The journal was created by Anthony J. Sutich with help and guidance from Abraham Harold Maslow in 1961. Later on in the 1960s, Sutich, Maslow, Stanislav Grof, Viktor Frankl, James Fadiman, Miles Vich and Michael Murphy created the school of transpersonal psychology. Maslow had concluded that humanistic psychology was incapable of explaining all aspects of human experience. After that change the Journal of Humanistic Psychology was turned over to Miles Vich.

== Abstracting and indexing ==
Journal of Humanistic Psychology is abstracted and indexed in, among other databases: SCOPUS, and the Social Sciences Citation Index. According to the Journal Citation Reports, its 2020 impact factor is 1.902, and its 5-year impact factor is 1.199 (https://journals.sagepub.com/metrics/jhp).
