= Postdiction =

Explanations given after the fact

Postdiction involves explanation after the fact. In skepticism, it is considered an effect of hindsight bias that explains claimed predictions of significant events such as plane crashes and natural disasters. In religious contexts, theologians frequently refer to postdiction using the Latin term vaticinium ex eventu (foretelling after the event). Through this term, skeptics postulate that many biblical prophecies (and similar prophecies in other religions) appearing to have come true may have been written after the events supposedly predicted, or that the text or interpretation may have been modified after the event to fit the facts as they occurred.

Skeptics of premonition use these terms in response to claims made by psychics, astrologers and other paranormalists to have predicted an event, when the original prediction was vague, catch-all, or otherwise non-obvious.

Most predictions from such figures as Nostradamus and James Van Praagh express the future with such seemingly deliberate vagueness and ambiguity as to make interpretation nearly impossible before the event, rendering them useless as predictive tools. After the event has occurred, however, the psychics or their supporters shoehorn details into the prediction by using selective thinking—emphasizing the "hits", ignoring the "misses"—in order to lend credence to the prophecy and to give the impression of an accurate "prediction". Inaccurate predictions are omitted.

Supporters of a prediction sometimes contend that the problem lies not with the wording of the prediction, but with the interpretation—an argument sometimes used by supporters of religious texts. This argument may lead to the question: "What is the point of a prediction that cannot be interpreted correctly before the event?" However, the argument is not that the prediction could not have been interpreted correctly prior to the event, but simply that it was not in the case in question, thus the question is working from a false premise. Of course, any "prediction" that is so vague as to not be correctly interpreted before the event it allegedly "predicted" is functionally equivalent to no prediction at all.

== Etymology ==
The term derives from the Latin suffix post- (after) and prefix -dictio, in the same way as "prediction" uses the prefix "pre-" (before).

== Postdiction in different contexts ==
=== Skepticism ===
In skepticism, postdiction is also referred to as post-shadowing, retroactive clairvoyance, or prediction after the fact, and is an effect of hindsight bias that explains claimed predictions of significant events, such as plane crashes and natural disasters. Accusations of postdiction might be applicable if the prediction were:

Vague
The prediction makes a non-specific claim. For example, it predicts a "disaster" of some kind, but not what it is. Such a prediction can be massaged to fit any number of events. Likewise, a prediction that does not state dates or places, or allows itself a large window of possible dates, can be made to fit many possibilities. A prophecy attributed to Saint Malachy (the Prophecy of the Popes, widely regarded as a 16th-century forgery) claims to predict the succession of Popes by describing each one briefly. However, each description is sufficiently vague that it can be massaged to fit after the fact.
Open ended
The prediction has a very long cut-off date or none at all, and therefore runs indefinitely. Many of Nostradamus' quatrains are open-ended and have been postdicted over the centuries to fit various contemporary events.
Recycled
The prediction is reused again and again in order to match the most recent event. Nostradamus' quatrains have been recycled numerous times.
Catch-all
The prediction covers more than one possible outcome. For example, the Delphic Oracle's answer as to whether Croesus should attack the Persians: If you attack, you will destroy a mighty empire. Croesus attacked, destroying his own empire.
Shotgunning
The prediction is in fact many predictions, designed to cover a range of events and claim credit even if only one of them happens. For example, claiming that a particular date is "unlucky" and then citing a dozen or so things that might happen on it. See selective thinking.
Statistically likely
The prediction makes a claim for something that happens with enough frequency that a high hit rate is virtually assured. For example, predicting terrorism on any day of the year, or particularly around national holidays, anniversaries (or similar events), or religious festivals. Another example would be predicting in the next week the deaths of a bishop and/or an actor, both of which occur most weeks.
Unfalsifiable
The prediction makes a claim that is impossible to verify or falsify. For example, a belief arose amongst a few in 2003 that a Planet X would pass the Earth in May of that year. When it singularly failed to appear, some claimed it was shrouded so that only an "educated eye" could see it and various other excuses, while discounting the most obvious reason—that Planet X does not exist at all in the form predicted.
Unavailable until after the fact
A prediction cannot be verified if there is no public record of when it was made. A famous example was the psychic Tamara Rand, who predicted that Ronald Reagan was in danger of someone with the initials "J. H.". The video interview in which this prediction was made was shot the day after the assassination attempt.
Counting the hits and not the misses
The prediction may be part of a series, but is singled out because it can be favourably interpreted, even if the series itself follows the laws of probability. For example, the prediction might correctly state movement on the stock market when previous or subsequent predictions have been wrong.
Allegory
The postdiction resorts to tenuous allegorical explanations to turn literal misses into hits. For example, the postdiction might explain that a famous person has suffered a "spiritual" death to explain why they are still walking around despite a prediction that says otherwise.
Moving the goalposts
The event must be "shoehorned" to fit the prediction because it differs in some significant way. For example, the prediction predicts an earthquake on one day, when in fact it happens on a different day. Nostradamus' supporters occasionally use this technique, like the September 11 terrorist attacks on the 45th parallel (actually around 40 degrees latitude).

These types are not exclusive, so a prediction could be vague, statistically likely and open-ended at the same time.

=== Cognitive science ===
In cognitive science, postdiction is the justification process that allows a reader to make sense of a concept in a given context. The term was coined by psychologist Walter Kintsch in 1980 and refined by cognitive scientist Afzal Upal in 2005. Heath & Heath used Upal's definition without explicitly citing him in their 2007 book Made to Stick. Concepts that can be justified in a given context are called postdictable.

=== Neuroscience ===
In neuroscience, postdiction indicates that the brain collects up information after an event before it retrospectively decides what happened at the time of the event (Eagleman and Sejnowski, 2000). Postdiction is a particular interpretation of experimental results showing temporal integration of information, and it has been largely debated.

The duration of the window of temporal integration of sensory information ranges between tens to hundreds of milliseconds. Its duration significantly varies across tasks, so there may be several postdictive windows of integration, and they are consistent across subjects. The duration of the postdictive windows of integration is supposedly hardwired in our brain, but it could be extended by training subjects to systematic delays between causally bounded events. The postdictive window is believed to be triggered by highly salient sensory events acting as resets, such as abrupt stimuli onset and saccadic eye movements.

Postdiction is argued to play a central role in shaping our sense of agency, by compressing the perceived interval between a voluntary action and its external sensory consequence.

Postdictive mechanisms are believed to constantly underlie our perception, and can be revealed by some perceptual illusions: for example, in the flash lag illusion and the cutaneous rabbit illusion the location of moving stimuli are mistakenly perceived due to their falling within the same postdictive window of integration.

== See also ==
- Black swan theory
- Clairvoyance
- Delusion
- Divination
- Forer effect
- Fortune-telling
- Hindsight bias
- Magical thinking
- Retroactive continuity
- Texas sharpshooter fallacy
