= Tactile illusion =

Illusion of the sense of touch

A tactile illusion is an illusion that affects the sense of touch. Some tactile illusions require active touch (e.g., movement of the fingers or hands), whereas others can be evoked passively (e.g., with external stimuli that press against the skin). In recent years, a growing interest among perceptual researchers has led to the discovery of new tactile illusions and to the celebration of tactile illusions in the popular science press. Some tactile illusions are analogous to visual and auditory illusions, suggesting that these sensory systems may process information in similar ways; other tactile illusions don't have obvious visual or auditory analogs.

== Passive tactile spatiotemporal illusions ==
Several tactile illusions are caused by dynamic stimulus sequences that press against the stationary skin surface.

- One of the best known passive tactile spatiotemporal illusions is the cutaneous rabbit illusion, in which a sequence of taps at two separated skin locations results in the perception that intervening skin regions were also tapped. The rabbit illusion, also called sensory saltation, occurs in vision and audition as well as in touch.
- The tau effect or perceptual length contraction is an illusion in which equally spaced taps to the skin are perceived as unequally spaced, depending on the timing between the taps. Specifically, a shorter temporal interval between two taps causes the illusion that the taps are closer together spatially. This illusion occurs also in vision and audition.
- The kappa effect or perceptual time dilation is a complementary illusion to the tau effect: taps separated by equal temporal intervals are perceived to be separated by unequal temporal interval, depending on the spatial intervals between the taps. Specifically, a longer spatial interval between taps causes the illusion that the taps are separated more in time. This illusion occurs also in vision and audition.
- If a person exposes their forearm and closes their eyes or turns their head in the opposite direction while a second person slowly traces a finger from the wrist upward to the crook of the elbow, many people are unable to say when the crease of their elbow is being touched.
- One of the least known passive tactile spatiotemporal illusions is the twisted lip illusion, in which a vertical edge touched to the two lips during a grimace is perceived to be tilted in the direction opposite to the skewed lips.

== Tactile adaptation illusions ==
Many illusions in vision are caused by adaptation, the prolonged exposure to a previous stimulus. In such cases, the perception of a subsequent stimulus is altered. This phenomenon is sometimes referred to as a contingent after-effect. Similarly, adaptation can cause such illusions in the sense of touch.

- If one hand is immersed in cold water and the other in hot for a minute or so, and then both hands are placed in lukewarm water, the lukewarm water will feel hot to the hand previously immersed in cold water, and cold to the hand previously immersed in hot water.
- If a person is lying on their stomach with arms stretched in front and another person raises their arms about 2 feet off the ground and holds them there for approximately one minute, with the person on the ground having their eyes closed and head hanging, then slowly lowers the arms to the ground, it will feel as if the arms are going below the level of the rest of the body.
- Focal adaptation evoked by prolonged stimulation to a skin area causes the illusion that two subsequently presented stimulus points straddling that area are farther apart than they actually are. This perceptual repulsion illusion is analogous to various visual repulsion illusions such as visual tilt effects.

== Other tactile illusions ==
- When eating, if a person holds food with one texture and another texture is presented to the mouth, many people perceive the perceived freshness and crispiness of the food to be between the two textures.
- When touching paradoxical objects, one can feel a bump when actually touching a hole. These "illusory" objects can be used to create tactile "virtual objects".
- The thermal grill illusion occurs when one touches the hand down on an interlaced grid of warm and cool bars and experiences the illusion of burning heat.
- When the thumb and forefinger are slid repeatedly along the edge of a wedge, a rectangular block then handled, in the same manner, will feel deformed.
- Moving the crossed index and middle finger along an edge evokes the perception of two parallel edges. Similarly, if a person crosses their index and middle finger and then rolls a marble between the tips of the fingers, two marbles are perceived.
- If a person wears a baseball cap for a long period of time and then takes it off, it may still be felt.
- If a person turns their tongue upside down, and runs their finger along the front, it will feel like the finger is moving in the opposite direction.
- If a person pushes outwards with their hands against something for a while, then stops, it will feel as if there is something stopping the person's hands from closing together. Similarly, if a person pulls outwards with their arms, for example pulling their pants outwards, then stops, it will feel as if something is keeping their hands from staying at their sides.
- After exercising on a treadmill or walking on a moving sidewalk for extended periods, a person will often feel "pulled forward" when they step off onto stationary ground.
- If two people join their opposite hands and one slides their index and thumb over two joined fingers, they will feel the other finger like it was one of their own.
- If a person has been in the sea for a long time, they may afterwards still feel the ocean current pushing and pulling them.
- If a person vigorously spins their relaxed hands in circles around each other and then slowly moves the palms of their hands towards each other, they may feel a sensation akin to magnetic repulsion (or an "invisible ball of energy") between their palms.

== See also ==
- Tactile hallucination
