= Matchbox sign =

Psychiatric medical sign

The matchbox sign, also referred to as the Ziploc bag sign or the specimen sign, is a psychiatric medical sign in which a patient arrives at a doctor's office with items extracted from the skin; these items are intended to serve as proof of a parasitic infestation, and are typically stored in a small container such as a matchbox. 50–80% of patients with delusional parasitosis present with this sign.

People with delusional parasitosis can damage their skin by attempting to remove imaginary parasites. These items may include scabs and skin particles, dust and dirt, and plant or animal fibers, and may be accompanied by photographs. Laboratory analysis fails to find proof of parasitic infestation.

== History ==
The matchbox was described by Lyell (1983) as the most common container used to present specimens to the physician.

Shelomi (2013) published a study of what he called scientific misconduct when a 2004 article in the Journal of the New York Entomological Society included what he says is photo manipulation of a matchbox specimen to support the claim that individuals with delusional parasitosis are infested with collembola.

== See also ==
- Formication – Abnormal sensation that bugs are crawling on or under the skin
- Morgellons – Pseudomedical skin condition
