= Saltation =

Saltation may refer to:

- Saltation (biology), an evolutionary hypothesis emphasizing sudden and drastic change
- Saltation (geology), a process of particle transport by fluids
- Cutaneous rabbit illusion (sensory saltation), a perceptual illusion evoked by a rapid sequence of sensory stimuli
- Saltation (software engineering), the antithesis of continuous integration
- Saltation (novel), a novel set in Sharon Lee and Steve Miller's Liaden universe

== See also ==
- Saltatory conduction, a process by which nerve impulses are transmitted along axons
