= Sleep-related hallucination =

Sleep-related hallucination may refer to:

- Hypnagogic hallucination – hallucinations while falling asleep
- Dreaming – conscious experiences during sleep
- Hypnopompic hallucination – hallucinations while waking up
