= Flash lag illusion =

Optical illusion

The flash-lag effect. When a visual stimulus moves along a continuous trajectory, it may be seen ahead of its veridical position with respect to an unpredictable event such as a punctuate flash. This illusion tells us something important about the visual system: contrary to classical computers, neural activity travels at a relatively slow speed. It is largely accepted that the resulting delays cause this perceived spatial lag of the flash. Still, after several decades of debates, there is no consensus regarding the underlying mechanisms.

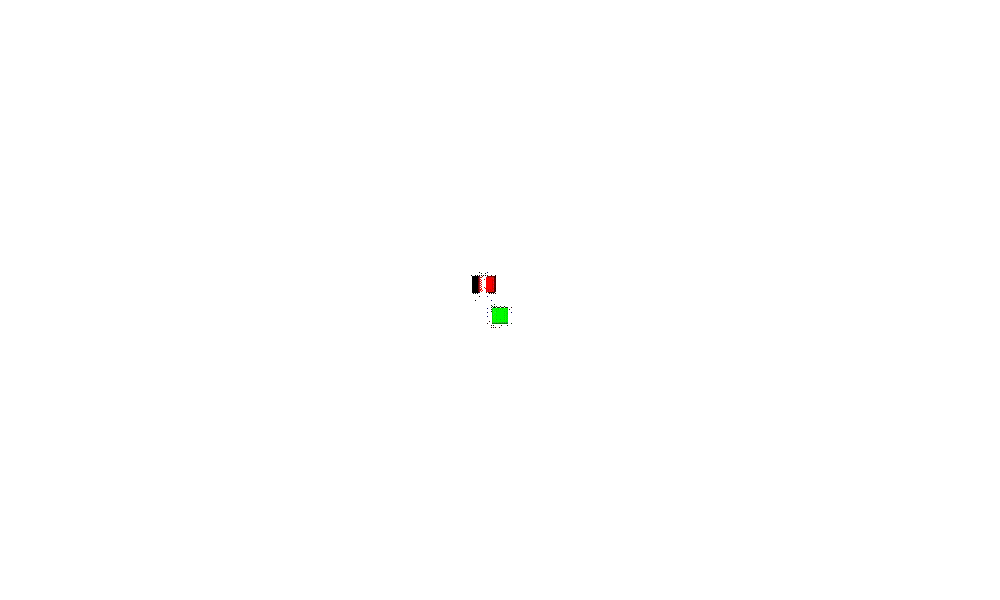
The still photo showing the green flash (frame 073, black background omitted).

The flash lag illusion or flash-lag effect is a visual illusion wherein a flash and a moving object that appear in the same location are perceived to be displaced from one another. Several explanations for this simple illusion have been explored in the neuroscience literature (for a review, see). (A briefly flashed static stimulus appears to lag behind its simultaneously presented brief replica if this replica appears in a stream of spatially localized, non-moving, filler stimuli; therefore, motion is not the necessary condition for the lag effect if looked at from the perspective of temporal delay of perception https://doi.org/10.1016/S0042-6989(01)00003-7.)

== Motion extrapolation ==
The first proposed explanation for the flash-lag effect is that the visual system is predictive, accounting for neural delays by extrapolating the trajectory of a moving stimulus into the future. In other words, when light from a moving object hits the retina, a certain amount of time is required before the object is perceived. In that time, the object has moved to a new location in the world. The motion extrapolation hypothesis asserts that the visual system will take care of such delays by extrapolating the position of moving objects forward in time.

== Latency difference ==
A second proposed explanation is that the visual system processes moving objects more quickly than flashed objects. This latency-difference hypothesis asserts that by the time the flashed object is processed, the moving object has already moved to a new position. The latency-difference proposal tacitly rests on the assumption that awareness (what the subject reports) is an on-line phenomenon, coming about as soon as a stimulus reaches its "perceptual end-point".

== Motion integration and postdiction ==
Eagleman & Sejnowski (2000abc) proposed a third alternative: visual awareness is neither predictive nor on-line, but is instead postdictive, such that the percept attributed to the time of the flash is a function of events that happen in the ~80 ms following the flash. This postdictive framework is consistent with findings in other fields, such as backward masking in visual psychophysics (Bachmann, 1994), or the color phi phenomenon. In backward masking, a stimulus followed in rapid succession by a second stimulus can block or modify the perception of the first one. In the color phi phenomenon, two colored dots presented sequentially within a small time and distance will appear to have changed color in the middle of their apparent trajectory. Since the viewer cannot know what the color of the second dot will be until having seen the second dot, the only explanation is that the conscious percept attributed to the "trajectory" of the dots is formed after the second dot has "arrived" at its destination. Eagleman & Sejnowski found that the perception attributed to the time of the flash depends on events in the next ~80 ms after the flash. In this way, they drew a correspondence between the flash-lag effect and the Fröhlich effect, wherein the first position of a moving object entering a window is misperceived.

A recent study tries to reconcile these different approaches by approaching perception as an inference mechanism aiming at describing what is happening at the present time. In particular, it could extend the motion extrapolation hypothesis by weighting this prediction by the precision of the current information. Thus, the corrected position of the moving target is calculated by combining the sensory flux with the internal representation of the trajectory, both of which exist in the form of probability distributions. To manipulate the trajectory is to change the precision and therefore the relative weight of these two information when they are optimally combined in order to know where an object is at the present time. For an object that moves predictably, the neural network can infer its most probable position taking into account this processing time. For the flash, however, this prediction can not be established because its appearance is unpredictable. Thus, while the two targets are aligned on the retina at the time of the flash, the position of the moving object is anticipated by the brain to compensate for the processing time: it is this differentiated treatment that causes the flash-lag effect. Moreover, this could also explain related phenomena such as motion reversal.

== See also ==
- Tau effect
- Kappa effect
- Cutaneous rabbit illusion
- Temporal illusions
- Fröhlich effect

== Other references ==
- Baldo, M.V.; Klein, S.A. (1995). "Extrapolation or attention shift?". Nature. 378 (6557): 565–6. Bibcode:1995Natur.378..565B. doi:10.1038/378565a0. PMID 8524389. S2CID 4306779.
- Snowden, R.J.; Braddick, O.J. (1989). "The combination of motion signals over time". Vision Research. 29 (11): 1621–30. doi:10.1016/0042-6989(89)90143-0. PMID 2635485. S2CID 6015282.
- Snowden, R.J.; Braddick, O.J. (1991). "The temporal integration and resolution of velocity signals". Vision Research. 31 (5): 907–14. doi:10.1016/0042-6989(91)90156-y. PMID 2035273. S2CID 16996397.
