= Morgellons =

Pseudomedical skin condition

Pseudomedical diagnosis
- Risks: Nocebo

Morgellons (/mɔːrˈɡɛlənz/) is the informal name of a self-diagnosed, scientifically unsubstantiated skin condition in which individuals have sores that they believe contain fibrous material. Morgellons is not well understood, but the general medical consensus is that it is a form of delusional parasitosis, on the psychiatric spectrum. The sores are typically the result of compulsive scratching, and the fibers, when analysed, are consistently found to have originated from cotton and other textiles.

The condition was named in 2002 by Mary Leitao, a mother who rejected the medical diagnosis of her son's delusional parasitosis. She chose the name from a letter written by a mid-17th-century physician. Leitao and others involved in her Morgellons Research Foundation successfully lobbied members of the U.S. Congress and the U.S. Centers for Disease Control and Prevention (CDC) to investigate the condition in 2006. CDC researchers issued the results of their multi-year study in January 2012, indicating that no disease organisms were present in the samples from the individuals examined and that the fibers found were likely cotton. The researchers concluded that the condition was "similar to more commonly recognized conditions such as delusional infestation".

== Medical description ==
Morgellons is poorly understood but the general medical consensus is that it is a form of delusional parasitosis in which individuals have some form of skin condition with sores that they believe contain fibers. Its presentation is very similar to delusional parasitosis, with the addition that people with the condition believe there are inanimate objects in their skin lesions. An active online community supports the notion that it is an infectious disease, disputes that it is psychological, and proposes an association with Lyme disease. Controversy has resulted; publications "largely from a single group of investigators" describe findings of spirochetes, keratin and collagen in skin samples in small numbers of patients; these findings are contradicted by much larger studies conducted by the CDC, which found skin samples mostly contained cellulose that came from cotton, with no evidence of infection or other causes.

== Society and culture ==
=== Mary Leitao ===
In 2001, according to Leitao, her then-two-year-old son developed sores under his lip and began to complain of bugs. Leitao says she examined the sores with her son's toy microscope and discovered red, blue, black, and white fibers. She states that she took her son to see at least eight different doctors who were unable to find any disease, allergy, or anything unusual about her son's described symptoms. Fred Heldrich, a Johns Hopkins pediatrician with a reputation "for solving mystery cases", examined Leitao's son. Heldrich found nothing abnormal about the boy's skin, and wrote to the referring physician that "Leitao would benefit from a psychiatric evaluation and support", and registered his worry about Leitao's "use" of her son. Leitao last consulted an unnamed Johns Hopkins infectious disease specialist who refused to see her son after reviewing his records, and suggested Leitao herself might have "Munchausen's by proxy, a psychiatric syndrome in which a parent pretends a child is sick or makes him sick to get attention from the medical system". According to Leitao, several medical professionals she sought out shared this opinion of a potential psychological disorder:

[Leitao] said she long ago grew accustomed to being doubted by doctors whenever she sought help for her son, who is now seven and still suffering from recurring lesions. "They suggested that maybe I was neurotic," Leitao said. "They said they were not interested in seeing him because I had Munchausen Syndrome by Proxy."

Leitao says that her son developed more sores, and more fibers continued to poke out of them. She and her husband, Edward Leitao, an internist, felt their son had "something unknown".

=== Morgellons named ===
Leitao chose the name Morgellons disease (with a hard g (Note: as opposed to a soft g in a presumable French pronunciation, [mɔʁʒəlɔ̃])) from a description of an illness in the medical case-history essay, A Letter to a Friend (c. 1656, pub. 1690) by Sir Thomas Browne, where the physician describes several medical conditions in his experience, including "that endemial distemper of children in Languedoc, called the morgellons, wherein they critically break out with harsh hairs on their backs".

=== Morgellons Research Foundation ===
Leitao started the Morgellons Research Foundation (MRF) informally in 2002 and as an official non-profit in 2004. The MRF website states that its purpose is to raise awareness and funding for research into the proposed condition, described by the organization as a "poorly understood illness, which can be disfiguring and disabling". Leitao stated that she initially hoped to receive information from scientists or physicians who might understand the problem, but instead, thousands of others contacted her describing their sores and fibers, as well as neurological symptoms, fatigue, muscle and joint pain, and other symptoms. The MRF claimed to have received self-identified reports of Morgellons from all 50 U.S. states and 15 other countries, including Canada, the UK, Australia, and the Netherlands. It also claimed that it had been contacted by over 12,000 families.

In 2012, the Morgellons Research Foundation closed down and directed future inquiries to the Oklahoma State University.

=== Media coverage ===
In May 2006, a CBS news segment on Morgellons aired in Southern California. The same day, the Los Angeles County Department of Health services issued a statement saying, "No credible medical or public health association has verified the existence or diagnosis of 'Morgellons Disease'", and "at this time there is no reason for individuals to panic over unsubstantiated reports of this disease". In June and July 2006, there were segments on CNN, ABC's Good Morning America, and NBC's The Today Show. In August 2006, a segment of the ABC show Medical Mysteries was devoted to the subject. Morgellons was featured on ABC's Nightline on January 16, 2008, and as the cover story of the January 20, 2008, issue of The Washington Post.

The first article to propose Morgellons as a new disease in a scientific journal was a review article co-authored by members of the MRF and published in 2006 by the American Journal of Clinical Dermatology. A 2006 article in the San Francisco Chronicle reported, "There have been no clinical studies" of Morgellons disease. A New Scientist article in 2007 also covered the phenomenon, noting that people are reporting similar symptoms in Europe and Australia.

In an article published in the Los Angeles Times on April 22, 2010, singer-songwriter Joni Mitchell claimed to have the condition.

On June 13, 2011, the Australian Broadcasting Corporation's Radio National broadcast The Mystery of Morgellons with guests including Mayo Clinic Professor Mark Davis.

=== CDC investigation ===
The Morgellons Research Foundation coordinated a mailing campaign via their website, in which thousands of people sent form letters to a Centers for Disease Control and Prevention (CDC) task force, which first met in June 2006. By August 2006, the task force consisted of 12 people, including two pathologists, a toxicologist, an ethicist, a mental health expert, and specialists in infectious, parasitic, environmental and chronic diseases.

In June 2007, the CDC started a website relating to Morgellons, CDC Study of an Unexplained Dermopathy, and by November 2007, the CDC opened an investigation into the condition. Kaiser Permanente, a health-care consortium in Northern California, was chosen to assist with the investigation, which involved skin biopsies from affected people and characterization of foreign material such as fibers or threads obtained from people to determine their potential source. The U.S. Armed Forces Institute of Pathology and the American Academy of Dermatology assisted with pathology. In January 2012, the CDC released the results of the study.

The CDC concluded that 59% of subjects showed cognitive deficits and 63% had evidence of clinically significant symptoms. They stated that 50% of the individuals had drugs in their systems, and 78% reported exposure to solvents (potential skin irritants). The study detected no parasites or mycobacteria in the samples collected from any individuals. Most materials collected from participants' skin were composed of cellulose, likely of cotton origin.

=== Internet and media influence ===
An active online community and publications "largely from a single group of investigators" have supported the notion that Morgellons is an infectious disease, and propose an association with Lyme disease; these findings are contradicted by the much larger studies conducted by the CDC. People usually self-diagnose Morgellons based on information from the internet and find support and confirmation in online communities of people with similar illness beliefs. In 2006, Waddell and Burke reported the influence of the internet on people self-diagnosed with Morgellons: "physicians are becoming more and more challenged by the many persons who attempt self-diagnosis on-line. In many cases, these attempts are well-intentioned, yet wrong, and a person's belief in some of these oftentimes unscientific sites online may preclude their trust in the evidence-based approaches and treatment recommendations of their physician."

Physician Fidel Vila-Rodriguez wrote in a 2008 editorial that the Internet promotes the spreading and supporting of "bizarre" disease beliefs because in online communities, "a belief is not considered delusional if it is accepted by other members of an individual's culture or subculture". Robert Bartholomew, a sociologist who has studied the Morgellons phenomenon, states that the "World Wide Web has become the incubator for mass delusion and it (Morgellons) seems to be a socially transmitted disease over the Internet." According to this hypothesis, people with delusions of parasitosis and other psychological disorders become convinced they have "Morgellons" after reading internet accounts of others with similar symptoms. This phenomenon is known as mass psychogenic illness, where physical symptoms without an organic cause spread to multiple people within the same community or social group. The Dallas Observer writes that Morgellons may be memetically spread via the internet and mass media, and "[i]f this is the case, then Morgellons is one in a long line of weird diseases that have swept through populations, only to disappear without a trace once public concern subsides". The article draws parallels to several media-spread mass delusions.

Dermatologist Caroline Koblenzer specifically faults the Morgellons Research Foundation (MRF) website for misleading people: "Clearly, as more and more of our patients discover this site (MRF), there will be an ever greater waste of valuable time and resources on fruitless research into fibers, fluffs, irrelevant bacteria, and innocuous worms and insects." A 2005 Popular Mechanics article stated that Morgellons symptoms are well known and characterized in the context of other disorders, and that "widespread reports of the strange fibers date back" only a few years to when the MRF first described them on the Internet. The Los Angeles Times, in an article on Morgellons, notes that "[t]he recent upsurge in symptoms can be traced directly to the Internet, following the naming of the disease by Mary Leitao, a Pennsylvania mother".

In 2008, The Washington Post reported that internet discussions about Morgellons include many conspiracy theories about the cause, including biological warfare, nanotechnology, chemtrails and extraterrestrial life. The Atlantic says it "even received pop-culture attention" when it was featured on Criminal Minds, adding that "Morgellons patients have further alienated themselves from the mainstream medical community" by "linking Morgellons to another illness viewed skeptically by most doctors, chronic Lyme disease, and by attacking those who doubt their condition".

== See also ==
- Culture-bound syndrome
- Formication
- Fringe medicine
- Jay Traver
- List of topics characterized as pseudoscience
- Mass psychogenic illness
- Matchbox sign
- Medicalization
- Münchausen syndrome
- Quaternary prevention
- Somatic symptom disorder
