= Delusional parasitosis =

Medical condition

- Other names: Ekbom's syndrome, delusory parasitosis, delusional ectoparasitosis, psychogenic parasitosis, dermatophobia, parasitophobia, and "cocaine bugs"
- Specialty: Psychiatry, dermatology

Delusional parasitosis (DP) or delusional infestation is a mental disorder in which individuals have a persistent delusion that their body is infested with living or nonliving agents, such as parasites, insects, or bacteria, when no such infestation is present. People with this condition may have skin symptoms such as the urge to pick at one's skin (excoriation) or a sensation resembling insects crawling on or under the skin (formication), associated with tactile hallucinations. Morgellons disease is a self-diagnosed subtype of delusional parasitosis in which individuals falsely believe harmful fibers are coming out of their skin and causing wounds.

Delusional parasitosis is classified as a delusional disorder in the fifth revision of the Diagnostic and Statistical Manual of Mental Disorders (DSM-5). The precise cause is unknown, but is thought to be related to dysfunctional dopamine transmission in the brain similar to other psychotic disorders. Diagnosis requires the delusion—which cannot be explained by another medical condition—be the only symptom of psychosis and has lasted a month or longer. Few individuals with the condition willingly accept treatment because they do not recognize the illness as a delusion. Antipsychotic medications and antidepressants can decrease symptoms.

The condition is rare and is observed twice as often in women as men. The average age of individuals affected by the disorder is 57. An alternative name, Ekbom's syndrome, honors the neurologist Karl-Axel Ekbom, who published seminal accounts of the disease in 1937 and 1938.

== Classification and terminology ==
Delusional infestation is classified as a delusional disorder of the somatic subtype in the Diagnostic and Statistical Manual of Mental Disorders (DSM-5).

The name delusional parasitosis has been the most common since 2015, but the condition has also been called delusional infestation, delusory parasitosis, delusional ectoparasitosis, psychogenic parasitosis, Ekbom syndrome, dermatophobia, parasitophobia, formication and "cocaine bugs".

DP may be a primary psychiatric disorder, or it can be secondary to other medical or psychiatric conditions.

Morgellons is a constellation of symptoms considered a form of delusional parasitosis in which people have painful skin sensations that they believe contain fibers of various kinds; its presentation is very similar to other delusional infestations, but people with this self-diagnosed condition also believe that strings or fibers are present in their skin lesions. Morgellons disease is not listed in the International Classification of Diseases (ICD-11).

== Signs and symptoms ==
People with delusional parasitosis believe that "parasites, worms, mites, bacteria, fungus" or similar organisms have infected them. Reasoning or logic cannot change this fixed, false belief. Frequent symptoms are a crawling or pin-pricking sensation, that typically manifests as a feeling of parasites crawling upon or burrowing into the skin and may include a physical sensation known as formication. A 2011 Mayo Clinic study of 108 individuals failed to find evidence of skin infestation in skin biopsies and or specimens; the study concluded that the feeling of skin infestation was DP.

People with this condition may injure themselves by using harsh chemicals or cleaning obsessively or by trying to remove the "parasites", leading to skin damage such as excoriation, bruises, and cuts. A "preceding event such as a bug bite, travel, sharing clothes, or contact with an infected person" is often identified by individuals with DP; such events may lead the individual to misattribute symptoms because of more awareness of symptoms they were previously able to ignore. Nearly any marking upon the skin, or small object or particle found on the person or their clothing, can be interpreted as evidence for the parasitic infestation, and individuals with the condition commonly compulsively gather such "evidence" to present to medical professionals. This presentation is known as the "matchbox sign", "Ziploc bag sign" or "specimen sign", because the "evidence" is frequently presented in a small container, such as a matchbox. The matchbox sign is present in five to eight out of every ten people with DP. Related is a "digital specimen sign", in which individuals bring collections of photographs to document their condition.

Similar delusions may be present in close relatives—a shared condition known as a folie à deux—that occurs in 5–15% of cases and is considered a shared psychotic disorder. Because the internet and the media contribute to furthering shared delusions, DP has also been called folie à Internet; when affected people are isolated from each other, their symptoms usually improve, but most still need treatment.

Approximately eight out of ten individuals with DP have co-occurring conditions—mainly depression, followed by substance abuse and anxiety. Their personal and professional lives are often disrupted due to extreme distress over their symptoms.

In primary DP, the delusions are the only manifestation of a psychiatric disorder. Secondary DP occurs when another psychiatric condition, medical illness or substance (prescription or recreational) use causes the symptoms.

== Cause ==
The cause of delusional parasitosis is unknown as of 2019.

Primary DP may result from high dopamine in the brain's striatum due to diminished dopamine transporter (DAT) function. DAT regulates dopamine reabsorption in the brain. Evidence supporting the dopamine theory is that medications that block dopamine reuptake, like cocaine and methylphenidate, are known to induce symptoms such as formication. Providing further support for the dopamine theory, antipsychotics improve DP symptoms, which may be because they affect dopamine transmission.

Other conditions that also demonstrate reduced DAT functioning are known to cause secondary DP; these include "schizophrenia, depression, traumatic brain injury, alcoholism, Parkinson's and Huntington's diseases, human immunodeficiency virus infection, and iron deficiency".

Secondary DP is caused by another medical or psychiatric disorder. Secondary forms of DP can be functional (due to psychiatric disorders) or organic (due to other medical illness or organic disease). The secondary organic form may be related to vitamin B_{12} deficiency, hypothyroidism, anemia, hepatitis, diabetes, HIV/AIDS, syphilis, or use of stimulants like methamphetamine and cocaine. Medical conditions associated with secondary delusional parasitosis include: deficiencies in vitamins such as B12 or folate, thyroid dysfunction, diabetes, Parkinson's disease, dementia, encephalitis, meningitis, and multiple sclerosis. Some infectious diseases such as HIV and syphilis have also been associated with DP. Secondary DP is also associated with substance use disorders—most commonly chronic alcohol use, alcohol withdrawal, long-term cocaine use, and long-term amphetamine use.

A number of prescription drugs may cause DP as a side effect, including "phenelzine, pargyline, ketoconazole, corticosteroids, amantadine, ciprofloxacin, pegylated interferon alpha, and topiramate."

== Diagnosis ==
Delusional parasitosis may be diagnosed when: 1) the delusion is the only symptom of psychosis, 2) the delusion has lasted a month or longer, 3) the person's behavior is otherwise not markedly odd or impaired, 4) mood disorders (if present at any time) have been comparatively brief, and 5) the delusion cannot be better explained by another medical condition, mental disorder, or the effects of a substance. For diagnosis, the individual must attribute abnormal skin sensations to the belief that they have an infestation, and be convinced that they have an infestation even when evidence shows they do not.

A comprehensive examination to rule out other causes of the person's symptoms is key to diagnosis; testing to rule out other conditions fosters trust between the provider and the person affected. To check for parasitic infestations, providers use skin examinations, skin biopsies, dermatologic tests and laboratory analyses. A detailed lab analysis to rule out other causes includes complete blood count, comprehensive metabolic panel, erythrocyte sedimentation rate, C-reactive protein, urinalysis for toxicology and thyroid-stimulating hormone. Bacterial infections may be present as a result of the individual constantly manipulating their skin. Depending on symptoms, tests may also be done for "human immunodeficiency virus, syphilis, viral hepatitis, B_{12} or folate deficiency", and allergies. Other conditions that can cause itching skin are also ruled out; this includes a review of medications that may lead to similar symptoms.

=== Differential ===
DP must be distinguished from scabies or mites. Pruritus and other skin conditions are most commonly caused by mites, but may also be caused by agricultural products from agricultural products, pet-induced dermatitis, caterpillar/moth dermatitis, or exposure to fiberglass.

Other related psychiatric conditions to be ruled out include schizophrenia, anxiety disorders, obsessive–compulsive disorder, dementia, delirium, affective or substance-induced psychoses, and medical conditions that cause psychosis.

Several drugs, legal or illegal, such as amphetamines, dopamine agonists, opioids, and cocaine may also cause the skin sensations reported. Diseases that must be ruled out in differential diagnosis include hypothyroidism, and kidney or liver disease. Many of these physiological factors, as well as environmental factors such as airborne irritants, are capable of inducing a "crawling" sensation in otherwise healthy individuals; some people become fixated on the sensation and its possible meaning, and this fixation may then develop into DP.

== Treatment ==
People with DP often reject the professional medical diagnosis, and few willingly undergo treatment, despite demonstrable efficacy, making the condition difficult to manage. Reassuring the individual with DP that there is no evidence of infestation is usually ineffective, as that information is rejected. Because individuals with DP typically see many physicians with different specialties, and feel a sense of isolation and depression, treatment guidelines emphasize the importance of gaining the trust of the individual with DP, and collaborating with other physicians, as key parts of the treatment approach. A five-phase approach to treatment is outlined by Heller et al. (2013) that seeks to establish rapport and trust between physician and patient. Dermatologists may have more success introducing the use of medication as a way to alleviate the distress of itching.

Directly confronting individuals about delusions is unhelpful because by definition, the delusions are not likely to change; confrontation of beliefs via cognitive behavioral therapy (CBT) is useful in those who are open to psychotherapy.

As of 2019, there had not been any studies that compare available pharmacological treatments to placebo. Low doses of antipsychotic medication are used; as of 2022, no specific antipsychotic has been demonstrated to be the most effective, but atypical antipsychotics (second generation) have a lower side effect profile than the typical antipsychotics (first-generation). Antipsychotics are used at the lowest possible dosage, and are increased gradually until symptoms remit. A 2022 literature review found in a small sample of individuals who had comorbid conditions along with DP that most treated with SSRI antidepressants experienced remission of their DP symptoms.

== Prognosis ==
People will often have symptoms for months before being diagnosed. The average duration of the condition is about three years. Cure may be achieved with antipsychotics or by treating underlying psychiatric conditions.

DP drastically impacts the lives of those affected and can lead to social isolation which can worsen depressive symptoms. Depression and suicide risk is elevated in people affected by DP. The condition can also impact the ability to function in daily life and negatively impact employment.

== Epidemiology ==
While DP is a rare disorder, it is the most common form of somatic delusion. It is more frequently observed than similar delusional conditions, such as the false belief that one is suffering from unpleasant body odor or bad breath. It may be undetected because those who have it do not see a psychiatrist because they don't recognize the condition as a delusion, making it difficult to estimate the number of people with delusional parasitosis. A population-based study in Olmsted County, Minnesota published in 2014 found a prevalence of 27 per 100,000 person-years and an incidence of almost 2 cases per 100,000 person-years. The majority of dermatologists will see at least one person with DP during their career.

The condition is observed twice as often in women than men. The highest incidence occurs in people in their 60s, but there is also a higher occurrence in people in their 30s, associated with substance use. It occurs most often in "socially isolated" women with an average age of 57.

About 56% of those with DP have primary DP.

== History ==
George Thibierge, a French physician, coined the term acarophobia in the 1890s to describe individuals "with the devastating, unshakeable belief that they were infested with mites", according to Mendelsohn et al (2024). Karl-Axel Ekbom, a Swedish neurologist, described delusional parasitosis as "pre-senile delusion of infestation" in 1937. The common name has changed many times since then. Ekbom originally used the German word dermatozoenwahn, but other countries used the term Ekbom's syndrome. That term fell out of favor because it also referred to restless legs syndrome (more specifically termed Willis–Ekbom disease (WED) or Wittmaack-Ekbom syndrome). Other names that referenced "phobia" were rejected because anxiety disorder was not typical of the symptoms. The eponymous Ekbom's disease was changed to "delusions of parasitosis" in 1946 in the English literature, when researchers J Wilson and H Miller described a series of cases, and to "delusional infestation" in 2009. The most common name since 2015 has been "delusional parasitosis".

Ekbom's original was translated to English in 2003; the authors hypothesized that James Harrington (1611–1677) may have been the "first recorded person to suffer from such delusions when he 'began to imagine that his sweat turned to flies, and sometimes to bees and other insects'."

=== Morgellons ===
Mary Leitao, the founder of the Morgellons Research Foundation, coined the name Morgellons in 2002, reviving it from a letter written by a physician in the mid-1600s. Leitao and others involved in her foundation (who self-identified as having Morgellons) successfully lobbied members of the U.S. Congress and the U.S. Centers for Disease Control and Prevention (CDC) to investigate the condition in 2006. The CDC published the results of its multi-year study in January 2012. The study found no underlying infectious condition and few disease organisms were present in people with Morgellons; the fibers found were likely cotton, and the condition was "similar to more commonly recognized conditions such as delusional infestation".

Since the early 2000s, a strong internet presence has led to increasing self-diagnosis of Morgellons. An active online community has supported the notion that Morgellons is an infectious disease, and propose an association with Lyme disease. Publications "largely from a single group of investigators" describe findings of spirochetes, keratin and collagen in skin samples of a small number of individuals; these findings are contradicted by the much larger studies conducted by the CDC.

== Society and culture ==
Jay Traver (1894–1974), a University of Massachusetts entomologist, has been characterized after her death as having made "one of the most remarkable mistakes ever published in a scientific entomological journal", after publishing a 1951 account of what she called a mite infestation. Her detailed description of her own experience with mites was later shown to be incorrect, and has been described by others as a classic case of delusional parasitosis. Matan Shelomi says the paper has done "permanent and lasting damage" to people with delusional parasitosis, "who widely circulate and cite articles such as Traver's and other pseudoscientific or false reports" via the internet, making treatment and cure more difficult. He argues that the historical paper should be retracted because it has misled people about their delusion and that papers "written by or enabling deluded patients", along with internet-fed conspiracies and the related delusion of Morgellons, may increase.

Shelomi published another study in 2013 of what he called scientific misconduct when a 2004 article in the Journal of the New York Entomological Society included what he says is photo manipulation of a matchbox specimen to support the claim that individuals with DP are infested with collembola.

== See also ==
- Stimulant psychosis
- Formication
- Morgellons
