= Trend Receiver =

The Trend Receiver Concept is a method for developing Customer Foresight (Baumgarth, 2018, Lüken 2020, van Deth 2020) and has been overall identified as an approach to develop foresight (Rohrbeck et al. 2015; Schwarz et al. 2018). At the core of the Trend Receiver Concept is the identification of suitable conversation partners, so called Trend Receivers, when developing foresight on the future demands and habits of consumers.

“Trend Receivers are individuals who perceive changes and potentials of the new in a specific domain in a highly sensitive and differentiated way”. The concept contributes to a firm's mid and long-term vision and strategy by combining both customers and foresight. The Trend Receiver Concept provides a guideline to identifying suitable individuals (Trend Receivers) and to designing resulting conversations with them.

== Characteristics of Trend Receivers ==
Trend Receivers are very well connected, have profound opinions about what motivates individuals and observe changes in society in a very reflective way. Trend Receivers can further be characterized as follows (Hofmann 2020):

1. Context experience: Trend Receivers have a profound understanding of the specific context due to their consumption and usage experiences and are thus familiar with the motive and value sets of consumers.
2. Self-abstraction ability: By using individual preferences and emotions as points of reference, Trend Receivers know the needs and patterns of other customer groups.
3. Curiosity and heterogeneity: Interested in consumer habits, lifestyle issues and the differentiation among social backgrounds, Trend Receivers are very curious about people from different backgrounds. They have a broad networked and have access to different ways of thinking and diverse and international sources of information.
4. Selection competence: Having a strong desire to understand causes and correlations, Trend Receivers have sharpened their competence to filter and perceive which structures, motives and values remain stable and to what extent new behavior patterns can emerge. They are able to recognize analogies and paradigms.
5. Biographical discontinuities: Trend Receivers often show discontinuities in their biographies. They are sensitive to complexity and changes in life.
6. Communication competence: An outstanding communication competence enables Trend Receivers to translate perceptions into a precise and descriptive language and to respond precisely to questions they are asked.

These characteristics enable Trend Receivers to identify new trends early and provide a coherent description of a possible or desirable everyday life in the future.

== Trend Receivers in the context of other concepts ==
In the context of concepts such as Lead Users, Early Adopters and Influencers, Trend Receivers can also be conceptualized. This conceptualization is called “Agents of the New”. This typology distinguishes three overarching categories: “inventors” who are thinking up and designing the new, “multipliers” who are early users spreading the new and “trend observers” who are perceiving and reflecting invention, diffusion, and normalization processes (Hofmann 2010). An important aspect for practice applications, is to identify concrete visionary customers who fit the context of the brand, product or service that needs to be decided or developed. The concept pleads for a tailored approach in order to meet individual research goals and to fulfill the complexities of research questions. Tools to apply at this stage are individual or context specific lists of criteria and search profiles for which the above-mentioned characteristics can serve as a basis. In the next step, intermediaries are asked to scan their networks for individuals meeting the search profiles who then also suggest others. In many cases, only a handful of people are eligible and out of those, the final selection is made.

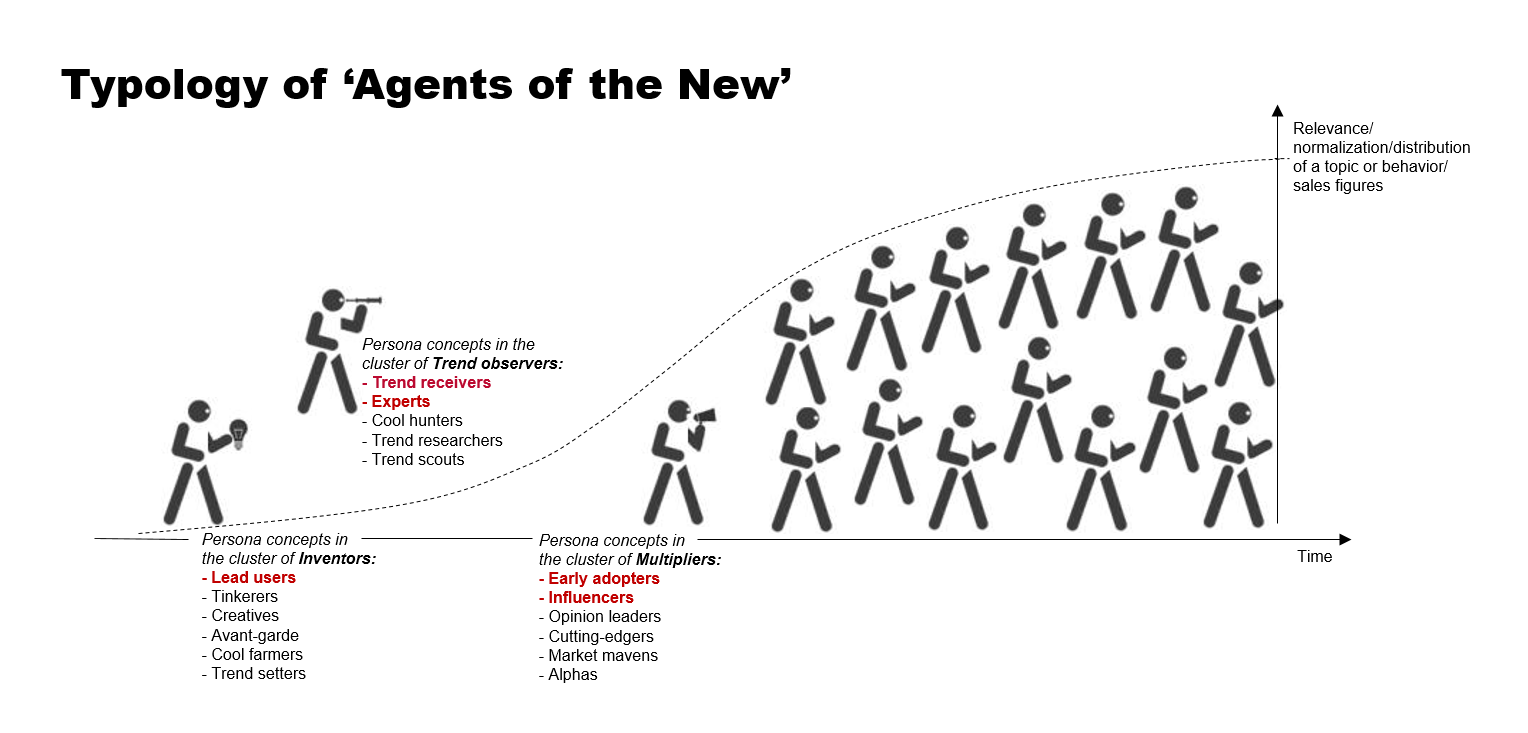
Different persona concepts in the field of invention, diffusion, communicational influence, innovation research, visionary competence and projection (Hofmann 2015)

== Use Cases of the Trend Receiver Concept ==
=== Tuesday 2025 ===
The objective of the project Tuesday 2025, carried out by Z-Punkt and Audi, was to derive insights into product and brand design as well as appropriate commercial and sales models based on an in-depth understanding of the future realities of Audi customers. (For more information see https://www.z-punkt.de/de/themen/artikel/wie-audi-in-die-zukuenftigen-lebenswelten-seiner-kunden-eintaucht1/535)

=== Easy Rider - Autonomous Driving from a Market and Customer Perspective ===
The objective of the project was to understand potentials and concerns from the customers’ point of view regarding autonomous driving. The intention was to gather clues and answers to the question of what an attractive car and mobility environment could look like when considering expanded technical possibilities. (For more information see Hahn et al. (2016)).

=== Cross Industry Study 'How do we want to live in 10 years?' ===
In 2017/18, four companies (Audi, BSH, Hornbach, and an international furniture brand) carried out a study, using the Trend Receiver Concept, with a focus on the following question: "How do we want to live in 10 years?” The project involved interviews with 30 Trend Receivers in Europe, China and the US. The Trend Receivers were asked how their everyday lives in areas such as mobility, nutrition, finances or leisure could and should develop in the next 10 years. This cross-industry approach was extended in 2019 within the work of The Foresight Academy (www.foresightacademy.com).

== See also ==
- New Product Development
- Innovation
- Lead User
- Market Research
