= General tau theory =

Theory of bodily movement guidance

General tau theory deals with the guidance of bodily movements. It was developed from work on J. J. Gibson's notion of ecological invariants in the visual flow-field during a perception-in-action event, and subsequently generalised by David N. Lee in the late 1990s to an amodal theory of perceptuomotor control.

The theory considers the organism acting as a unified whole in dynamic relations with its environment, rather than conceiving of the organism as a complex mechanical device reducible into analysable parts. The theory is embedded in ecological thinking, paying attention to both organism and environment, and drawing information from their forms of interaction. It was developed by thinking about the relational, or ecological invariants in engagements between organism and environment. This whole-systems approach offers insight into the nature of living and offers pragmatic, human benefits in both designing the constructed world (e.g. in cockpit design) and in therapy of movement disorders (e.g. Parkinson's disease).

== See also ==
- Tau effect
