= A Letter to a Friend =

Letter by Thomas Browne

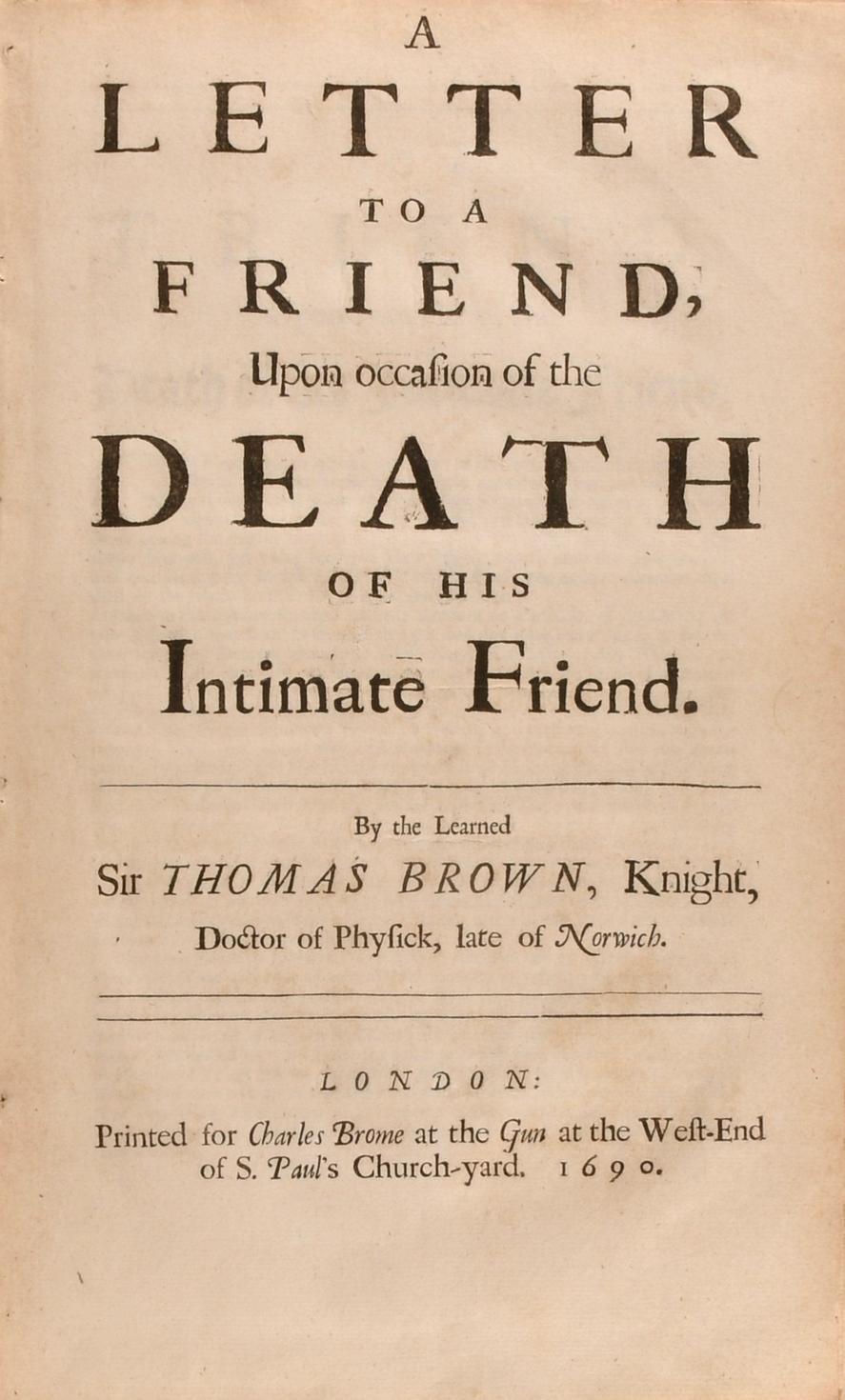
- Title page of 1690 first edition
- Author: Sir Thomas Browne
- Subject: Medicine
- Publication date: 1690
- Publication place: Kingdom of England
- Dewey Decimal: 826
- LC Class: PR3327

A Letter to a Friend (written 1656; published posthumously in 1690), by Sir Thomas Browne, the 17th century English philosopher and physician, is a medical treatise of case-histories and witty speculations upon the human condition.

== Publication ==
The Letter was first published as a folio pamphlet in 1690, after having been left out of the 1686 posthumous collection of Browne's complete works. Few copies of this pamphlet are extant; several of those which have survived did so because they were bound as an addition to his complete works. It was then included in his 1712 Poshumous Works printed by Edmund Curll, and a 1716 collection titled Christian Morals edited by John Jeffrey.

== Morgellons ==
Browne's pamphlet is the source of a term Mary Leitao coined in 2001 to describe her son's skin condition. She chose the name "Morgellons disease" based on a skin condition described by Browne in Letter to a Friend, thus:

Hairs which have most amused me have not been in the Face or Head, but on the Back, and not in Men but Children, as I long ago observed in that endemial Distemper^{33} of little Children in Languedock, called the Morgellons, wherein they critically break out with harsh Hairs on their Backs, which takes off the Unquiet Symptomes of the Disease, and delivers them from Coughs and Convulsions^{34}.

There is, however, no suggestion that the symptoms described by Browne are linked to the alleged modern cases of Morgellons. In 1935, Charles Ernest Kellett MD FRCP (1903–1978), who lectured in the history of medicine at the University of Newcastle medical school, wrote a detailed criticism of Browne's Morgellons reference.
