= Customer foresight =

Anticipating consumer preferences/wishes with future products and services

Customer foresight is a new field of applied research. It aims to understand future consumer preferences and wishes with regard to tomorrow's products and services. It does so by combining customer research and foresight research elements. Customer foresight can be conceived as an interaction with projected future markets through selected customers by understanding their wishes and attitudes, ideas and visions as well as their perception of signals and drivers of change. Even though the concept cannot predict the future, it enables companies to prepare for different future scenarios and thus improves strategy and decision-making processes.

== Definition and classification ==
As the future combines both continuity and change, not everything one knows today will disappear tomorrow. Some things will change significantly while others will not. But even today, research reveals that numerous inventions fail due to a lack of customer centricity. Consequently, anticipating future customer needs and behaviors constitutes a challenge when developing future product portfolios. This is especially relevant for industries with long planning cycles because these industries have to develop value propositions today for the customers of tomorrow. However, this involves dealing with many unknowns e.g. future everyday life or future consumption patterns. This is why, customer foresight starts with analyzing the consumer needs, values and motivations of today. Methods in the field of customer research that can be applied at this stage are e.g. qualitative and quantitative surveys, behavioral observation and experience, ethnographic research, cultural analysis or value and motivation research. On the basis of these consumer insights, transformations and change dynamics are projected into the future. As a result, a space of possibility is defined.

In order to then understand future realities, customer and foresight research are combined. Foresight tools to apply can for example be scenario planning, trend research and science fiction. However, also quantitative methods such as time series analysis can be used. Their application allows for understanding dynamics of change and projecting the envisioned developments into the future. The following graphic visualizes and classifies the approach in the sweet spot of customer and foresight research.

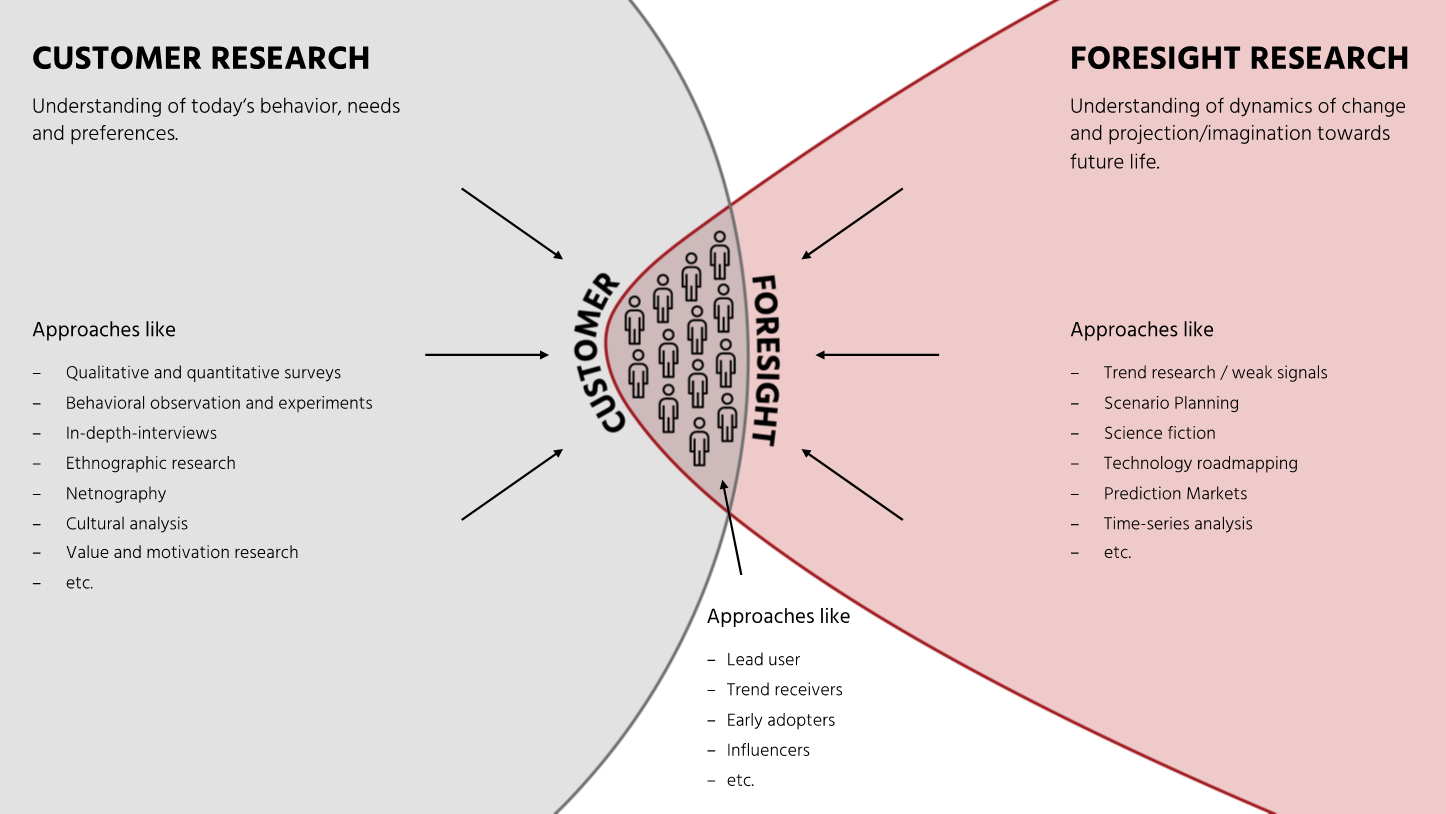
Classification of customer foresight at the intersection of customer and foresight Research (Eller, Hofmann & Schwarz 2020)

At the intersection of customer and foresight research, it is then crucial to understand the interaction of customers with drivers of change or future realities. As customer foresight relies a lot on insight generation through interactions, a systematic selection of study participants is of great importance. Through interacting with Trend Receivers or other study participants, insights are generated which are then analyzed. The following section provides a more detailed description of the stages of typical customer foresight projects.

== Stages of customer foresight projects ==
The customer foresight journey typically starts with the identification of relevant business needs by e.g. analyzing market dynamics, visions and objectives and value propositions. In a second step, change dynamics are analyzed and research materials on future scenarios are collected e.g. by applying scenario planning, doing desk research, roadmapping and gathering inputs from science fiction (for an example of a multi-method study approach in the field of customer foresight see Hahn et al. 2016). Then, the most suitable dialogue partners and project participants are selected by applying pyramiding techniques, screening, scouting or broadcasting. The interviews can be organized in role-playing, workshop formats or in-depth interviews. Based on these inputs, practical implications are identified which are then integrated by decision makers through strategy workshops, backtesting or design thinking sprints. As a consequence, customer foresight insights are transferred into business value.

== Mass customer foresight ==
As the name already alludes, mass customer foresight is about insights that are valid for the mass market or the average customer and are representative for societies or markets. In contrast to customer foresight, it uses large scale, quantitative tools to examine future consumer behavior in a representative way. The following figure classifies the concept with regard to customer insight and foresight.

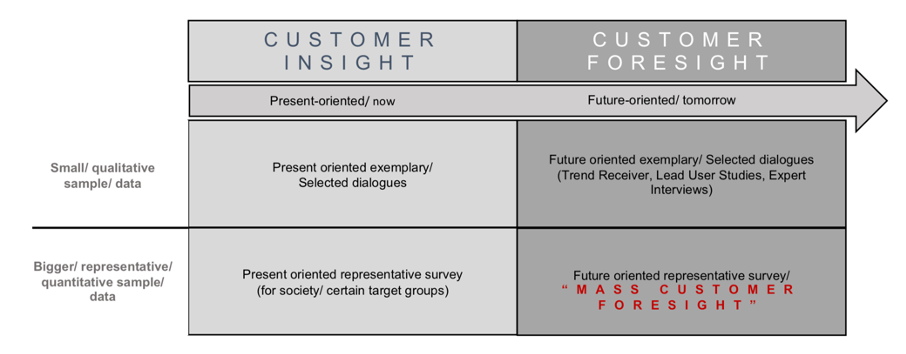
Classification of mass customer foresight (workshop of Goethe University and the Foresight Academy)

The concept was developed by Goethe University and the Foresight Academy as an extension to the customer foresight concept. The latter is often criticized as too elitist because the application of the e.g. Trend Receiver methodology by its definition implies that the subjects do not embody the average consumer. Since the customer base of many companies consists of the broad mass of people it can be important to enrich insights generated in the course of interactions with a selection of customers with the view of a representative sample. Consequently, the importance of these insights for corporate strategy formulation can be increased.

An example for such a mass customer foresight study is the research project which was carried out in the course of the collaboration between Goethe University and the Foresight Academy. Here, such a quantitative study was designed and carried out within Germany, China and the United States. The research project built on the results of a Trend Receiver study that examined the question “How do we want to live in 10 years?” within six areas of life: living, leisure and work; health and nutrition, consumption and finance; communication; identity and expression as well as community and society. The qualitative insights generated through the interviews were used as the hypotheses to validate within the joint quantitative survey. As a consequence, empirical research can approve or reject projections made and increase the validity of the qualitative results and their importance for corporate strategy and decision making.

While customer foresight itself is a new research field, mass customer foresight is still in the experimental stages. However, it will be interesting to observe its further development in theory and practice.

== See also ==
- Early adopter – Early customer of a company, product, or technology
- Futures studies – Study of postulating possible futures
- Innovation – Practical implementation of improvements
- Lead user – Market research term
- Market research – Type of business activity
