= Postdictable =

Postdictable concepts are those concepts that can be justified after having been seen. Upal labeled a counterintuitive concept as postdictable if the postdiction process is successful making sense of the concept i.e., the reader is successfully able to construct a justification given the reader's background knowledge, level of motivation and interest, and the cognitive resources (including time) available to the reader. According to the context-based model of minimal counterintuiveness, postdictable counterintuitive concepts are minimally counterintuitive and are remembered well. Those counterintuitive concepts that are not postdictable in a given context are considered to be maximally counterintuitive and are not remembered well by people. Thus the concept of a flying elephant is postdictable (and thus minimally counterintuitive) when set up in the context of Operation Dumbo Drop because it can be justified in that context. The concept of a "square triangle that only exists on Wednesdays and eats cats" however does not make any sense and is therefore not postdictable.

== See also ==
- Postdiction
- The Minimal Counterintuitiveness Effect
- Context-based model of minimal counterintuiveness
