= Visual temporal integration =

Visual temporal integration is a perceptual process of integrating a continuous and rapid stream of information into discrete perceptual episodes or 'events'. Arguably, integrating over small temporal windows, as opposed to sampling 'snapshots', allows the brain to evaluate visual information more reliably. VTI by the brain reflects an important property of the world: the closer in time two pieces of information occur, the more likely it is that they will be part of the same 'event'. Several other factors determine the brain's integration window.

One way in which scientists are studying visual temporal integration is by investigating the differences experienced by people with unusual ways of perceiving the world, for example through schizophrenia or autism.
