= Backtesting =

Testing a predictive model on historical data

Backtesting is a term used in modeling to refer to testing a predictive model on historical data. Backtesting is a type of retrodiction, and a special type of cross-validation applied to previous time period(s). In quantitative finance, backtesting is an important step before deploying algorithmic strategies in live markets.

== Financial analysis ==
In economics and finance, backtesting seeks to estimate the performance of a strategy or model if it had been employed during a past period. This requires simulating past conditions with sufficient detail, which means that backtesting is limited by the need for detailed historical data, the inability to model strategies that would affect historic prices, and potential overfitting. That is, it is often possible to find a strategy that would have worked well in the past, but will not work well in the future. Despite these limitations, backtesting provides information not available when models and strategies are tested on synthetic data.

Historically, backtesting was only performed by large institutions and professional money managers due to the expense of obtaining and using detailed datasets. However, backtesting is increasingly used on a wider basis, and independent web-based backtesting platforms have emerged. Although the technique is widely used, it is prone to weaknesses. Basel financial regulations require large financial institutions to backtest certain risk models.

For a Value at Risk 1-day at 99% backtested 250 days in a row, the test is considered green (0-95%), orange (95-99.99%) or red (99.99-100%) depending on the following table:

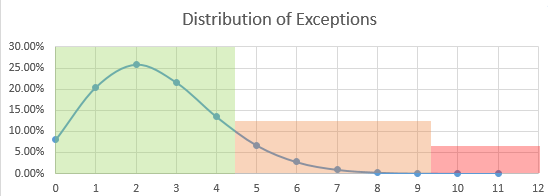
backtesting exceptions 1Dx250

1-day VaR at 99% backtested 250 days
Zone	Number exceptions	Probability	Cumul
Green	0	8.11%	8.11%
Green	1	20.47%	28.58%
Green	2	25.74%	54.32%
Green	3	21.49%	75.81%
Green	4	13.41%	89.22%
Orange	5	6.66%	95.88%
Orange	6	2.75%	98.63%
Orange	7	0.97%	99.60%
Orange	8	0.30%	99.89%
Orange	9	0.08%	99.97%
Red	10	0.02%	99.99%
Red	11	0.00%	100.00%
Red	...	...	...

For a Value at Risk 10-day at 99% backtested 250 days in a row, the test is considered green (0-95%), orange (95-99.99%) or red (99.99-100%) depending on the following table:

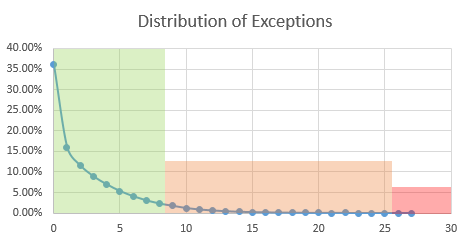
backtesting exceptions 10Dx250

10-day VaR at 99% backtested 250 days
Zone	Number exceptions	Probability	Cumul
Green	0	36.02%	36.02%
Green	1	15.99%	52.01%
Green	2	11.58%	63.59%
Green	3	8.90%	72.49%
Green	4	6.96%	79.44%
Green	5	5.33%	84.78%
Green	6	4.07%	88.85%
Green	7	3.05%	91.90%
Green	8	2.28%	94.17%
Orange	9	1.74%	95.91%
Orange	...	...	...
Orange	24	0.01%	99.99%
Red	25	0.00%	99.99%
Red	...	...	...

== Hindcast ==
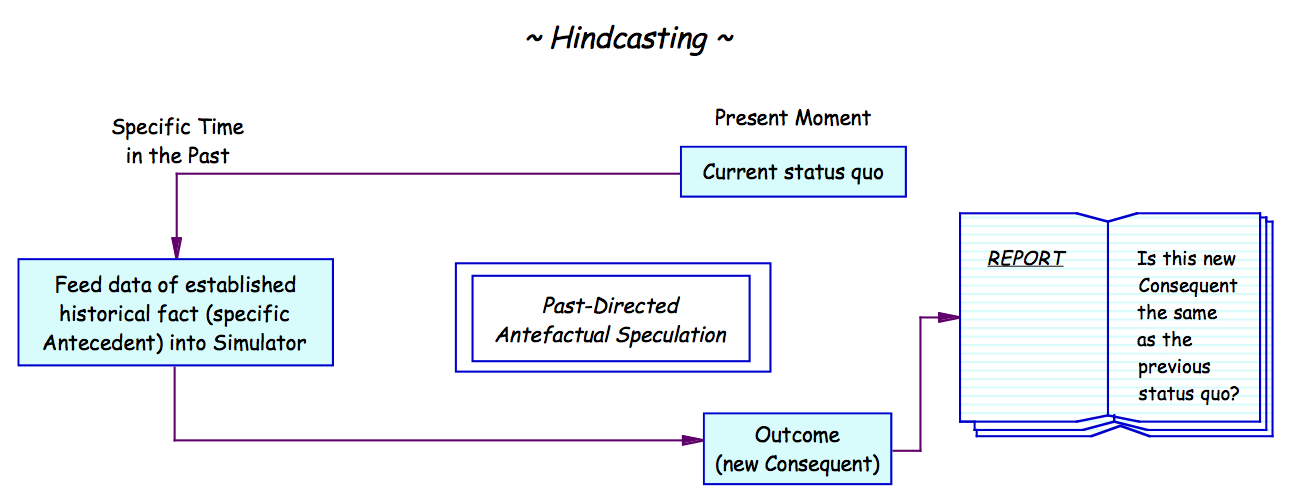
Temporal representation of hindcasting.

In oceanography and meteorology, backtesting is also known as hindcasting: a hindcast is a way of testing a mathematical model; researchers enter known or closely estimated inputs for past events into the model to see how well the output matches the known results.

Hindcasting usually refers to a numerical-model integration of a historical period where no observations have been assimilated. This distinguishes a hindcast run from a reanalysis. Oceanographic observations of salinity and temperature as well as observations of surface-wave parameters such as the significant wave height are much scarcer than meteorological observations, making hindcasting more common in oceanography than in meteorology. Also, since surface waves represent a forced system where the wind is the only generating force, wave hindcasting is often considered adequate for generating a reasonable representation of the wave climate with little need for a full reanalysis. Hydrologists use hindcasting for model stream flows.

An example of hindcasting would be entering climate forcings (events that force change) into a climate model. If the hindcast showed reasonably-accurate climate response, the model would be considered successful.

The ECMWF re-analysis is an example of a combined atmospheric reanalysis coupled with a wave-model integration where no wave parameters were assimilated, making the wave part a hindcast run.

== See also ==
- Applied research (customer foresight) – Anticipating consumer preferences/wishes with future products and services
- Backcasting – Influencing current reality from desired future state scenario
- Black box model – System where only the inputs and outputs can be viewed, and not its implementation
- Climate – Long-term weather pattern of a region
- Computer simulation – Process of mathematical modelling, performed on a computer
- ECMWF re-analysis – Data set for retrospective weather analysis
- Economic forecast – Process of making predictions about the economy
- Forecasting – Making predictions with available data
- NCEP re-analysis – Open data set of the Earth's atmosphere
- Numerical weather prediction – Weather prediction using mathematical models of the atmosphere and oceans
- Predictive modelling – Form of modelling that uses statistics to predict outcomes
- Retrodiction – Making a "prediction" about the past
- Statistical arbitrage – Short-term financial trading strategy
- Thought Experiment – Hypothetical situation
- Value at risk – Estimated potential loss for an investment under a given set of conditions
