= Cenesthopathy =

Aberrant bodily sensation

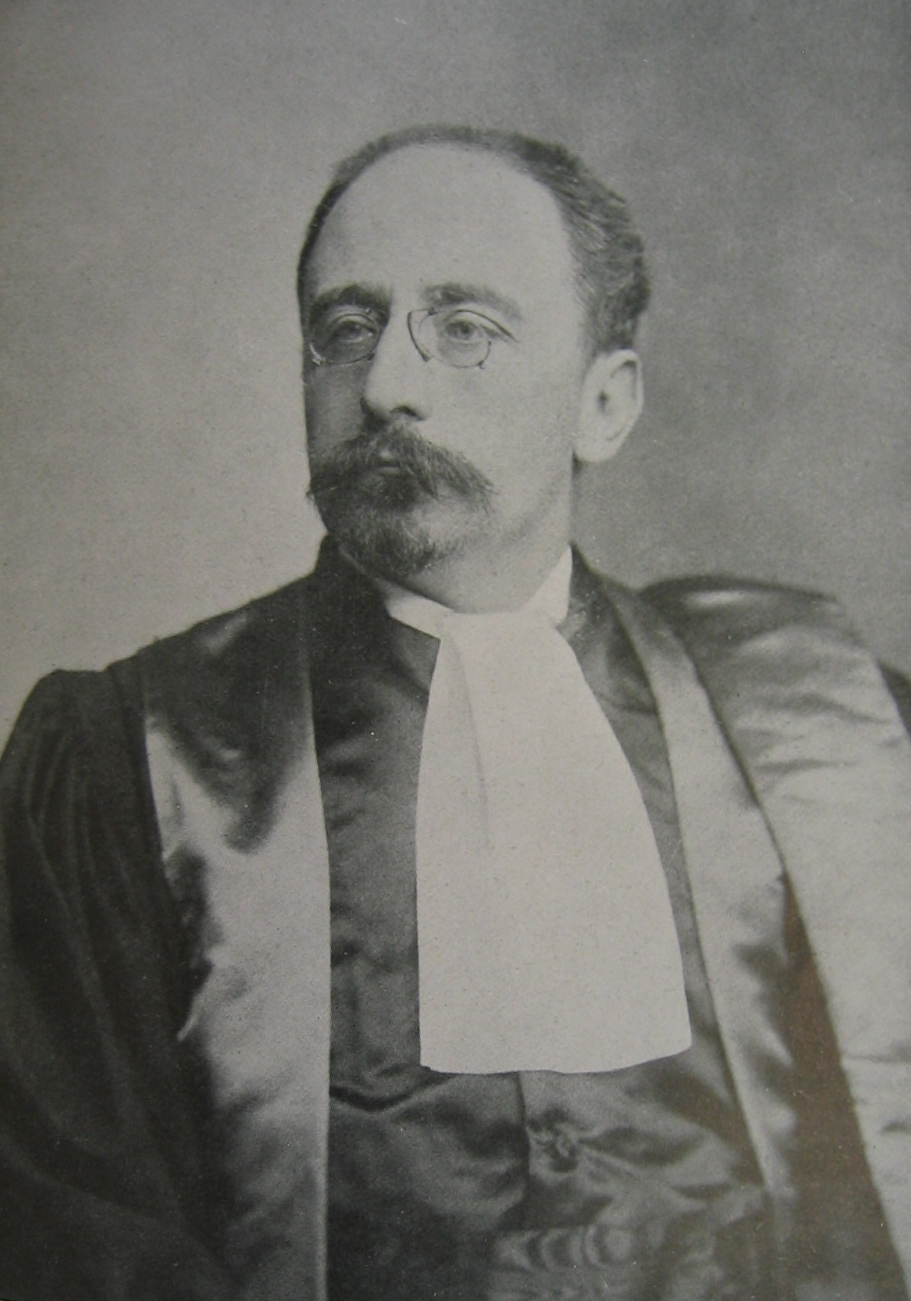
Ernest Dupré (1862-1921), French psychiatrist and coiner of the term Cenestopathy alongside Paul Camus

Cenesthopathy, also known as cenesthesiopathy and coenesthesiopathy, is a rare psychiatric term used to refer to aberrant, intrusive, and distressing internal bodily sensations without corresponding organic or physiological abnormalities. It represents a distortion of cenesthesia; the internal, global, implicit, and affective sense of inhabiting one's body. Cenesthopathy can occur throughout the body, though certain areas such as the oral cavity might be more frequently affected. Experiences include both diminished awareness of body or body parts, and altered sensory perception of specific bodily regions.

== Classification ==
Several conceptual classification schemes for cenesthopathy have been proposed. Hozaki classified cenesthopathy into primary monosymptomatic and secondary forms, with the latter appearing secondary to neurological or psychiatric disorders such as schizophrenia, substance abuse, or mood disorders, and the former manifesting as isolated perceptual delusions involving abnormal bodily sensations without an underlying disorder. Yoshimatsu proposed a more phenomenologically nuanced five-group classification based on mental manifestation features, complaint details, and patient attitude:

- related to disruption of self-consciousness or depersonalization
- related to perception of slight illness
- characterized by grotesque and bizarre sensations experienced as real
- marked by selfish attitude and exaggerated complaints

Subtypes of cenesthesia (adapted from Blom et al. (2010))
Type	Etymology	Clinical description
Coenesthesiopathy (cenesthopathy)	"Coenesthesia" (κοινός + [αἴ]σθησῐς) + -"pathy".	A pathological alteration in the sense of bodily being, caused by abnormal, bizarre sensations in the body.
Hypercoenesthesiopathy (hypercenesthopathy)	("hyper-", from Ancient Greek ὑπέρ (hupér, "excess") + "coenesthesiopathy")	A hypertrophic alteration in the sense of bodily being, caused by abnormal, bizarre sensations in the body.
Hypocoenesthesiopathy (hypocenesthopathy)	("hypo-", from Ancient Greek ὑπό (hupó, "under") + coenesthesiopathy)	A hypotrophic alteration in the sense of bodily being, caused by abnormal, bizarre sensations in the body.
Paracoenesthesiopathy (paracenesthopathy)	("para-", from Ancient Greek παρά (pará, "beside, by, contrary to") + coenesthesiopathy)	A qualitative alteration in the sense of bodily being, caused by abnormal, bizarre sensations in the body.
Acoenesthesiopathy (Note: Also known as acenesthesia, or total asomatognosia.) (acenesthopathy)	("a-", from Ancient Greek ἀ- (a-, "not") + coenesthesiopathy)	A total absence of the sense of physical existence.

== Signs and symptoms ==
Cenesthopathy is characterized by abnormal and bizarre bodily sensations that are experienced as strange, disturbing, and intrusive that lack a physiological basis. Reported sensations include a feeling of wires or coils being present within the oral region; tightening, burning, tingling, electrical currents, pressure, heaviness, internal movement or shifting, and feelings of foreign objects in the body. Patients may describe physiologically impossible sensations, such as itching within the brain or freezing of internal organs where appropriate sensory receptors are absent. Visceral experiences are common, with reports of internal organs shifting position, temperature waves flowing through organs, or feelings that body parts have become hollow.

Another frequent symptom is preoccupation with bodily sensations, with excessive focus on normal physiological processes such as heartbeat, breathing, or digestion. Body representation disturbances also frequently co-occur, with altered perceptions of body size, shape, or internal movements like pulling, pressure, and perceived electric-like shocks within internal structure.

== Diagnosis ==
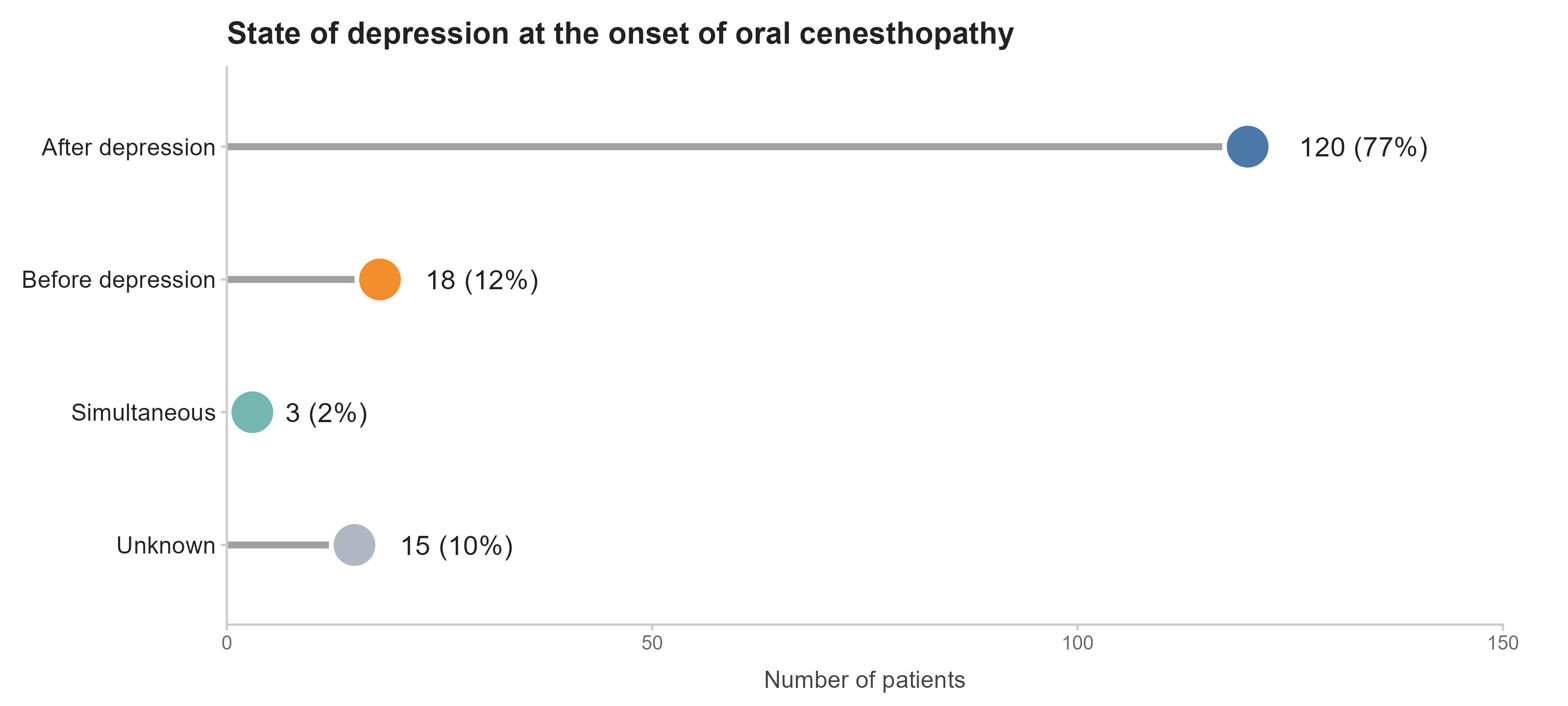
State of depression at the onset of oral cenesthopathy, based on data reported by Umezaki.

=== Cenesthopathic schizophrenia ===
The established occurrence of coenesthetic hallucinations in 18% of individuals with a psychiatric diagnosis of schizophrenia has led to the formulation of a separate subgroup of schizophrenia in the ICD-10, called cenesthopathic schizophrenia. Cenesthopathic schizophrenia is included (but not defined) within the category "other schizophrenia" (F20.8) in the 10th revision of the International Statistical Classification of Diseases and Related Health Problems.

=== Oral cenesthopathy ===
In the DSM-5, oral cenesthopathy is categorized under "Delusional Disorder, Somatic Type" (DDST), which encompasses conditions where delusions center on bodily functions or sensations. In the ICD-10, it is categorized as a "persistent delusional disorder" or "other schizophrenia". No independently defined diagnostic criteria exist for oral cenesthopathy, and its diagnostic validity remains debated.

=== Standalone condition ===
In Japan, patients with abnormal bodily sensations are often diagnosed with cenesthopathy as a separate clinical entity and one of the monosymptomatic hypochondriacal psychosis.

== Demographics ==
In one small study 83.3% of schizophrenia patients presented with some form of cenesthopathy. The age and sex distribution of cenesthopathy remains poorly understood. In a Japanese case series of 100 patients, cenesthopathy occurred more frequently in adolescent males, while in middle-aged to elderly patients it was more frequently reported in females. Elderly women might be more commonly affected by oral cenesthopathy.

Estimates of prevalence of specifically oral cenesthopathy vary. In a University Psychiatry Clinic in Okayama, Japan, cenesthopathy was diagnosed in 18 of 10,278 outpatients (0.18%) over a 5.5-year period. A University Psychiatry Clinic in Tokyo reported cenesthopathy in 31 of 1,670 inpatients (1.86%) over 12 years and 37 of 15,600 outpatients (0.24%) over 3 years. Among cenesthopathy cases in these studies, approximately 85% involved oral cenesthopathy. In specialized psychosomatic dentistry settings, prevalence appears higher (27%). This elevated rate are likely due to referral bias, as patients seeking psychosomatic dental care may be pre-selected for oral symptoms.

== History ==
The term cenesthopathy derives from French cénestopathie, formed from the Ancient Greek κοινός (koinós) "common", αἴσθησῐς (aísthēsis) "feeling", "perception" + πᾰ́θος (páthos) "feeling, suffering, condition".

It was coined in 1907 by French neuropsychiatrists Ernest Ferdinand Pierre Louis Dupré and Paul Camus in their seminal paper Les cénesthopathies, to describe a clinical entity characterized by "alterations of the common or internal sensibility"; disorders of sensations that continuously arrive at the brain from throughout the body.

Huber introduced the concept of cenesthetic schizophrenia in 1957, defining it as a form of schizophrenia where abnormal bodily sensations constitute the primary feature. According to Huber's definition, these sensations are peculiar, challenging for patients to articulate, and follow a chronic progressive course, with conventional schizophrenic symptoms manifesting only during transient psychotic episodes.
