= Formication =

Abnormal sensation that bugs are crawling on or under the skin

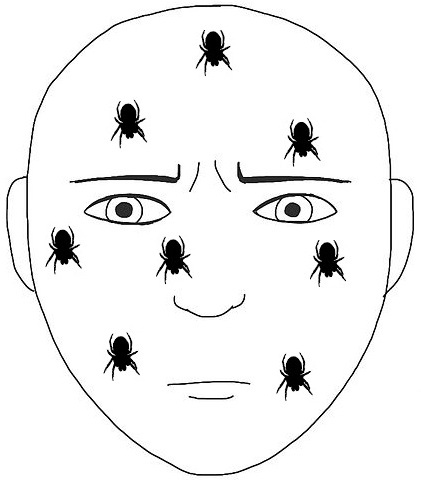
- Specialty: Psychiatry, neurology

Formication is the sensation resembling that of small insects crawling on (or under) the skin, in the absence of actual insects. It is one specific form of a set of sensations known as paresthesias, which also include the more common prickling, tingling sensation known as pins and needles. Formication is a well-documented symptom which has numerous possible causes. The word is derived from formica, the Latin word for ant.

Formication may sometimes be experienced as feelings of itchiness, tingling, pins and needles, burning, or even pain. When formication is perceived as itchiness, it may trigger the scratch reflex, and, because of this, some people who experience the sensation are at risk of causing skin damage through excessive scratching.

In some cases, static electricity can attract particulates to the skin and can also cause body hair to move, giving a sensation like insects crawling over the skin. However, in many cases no external trigger creates the sensation.

In rare cases, individuals become convinced the sensation is due to the presence of real insects on or under the skin. Such patients have what is known as delusional parasitosis. They believe their skin is inhabited by, or under attack by, small insects or similar parasites, despite repeated reassurances from physicians, pest control experts, and entomologists.

== Causes ==
Causes of formication include normal states such as onset of menopause (i.e. hormone withdrawal). Other causes are medical conditions such as pesticide exposure, mercury poisoning, diabetic neuropathy, skin cancer, syphilis, Lyme disease, hypocalcaemia, or herpes zoster (shingles) and neurocysticercosis. Formication can be a result of stimulant intoxication or withdrawal from methamphetamine, Datura, cocaine, or alcohol in alcoholics (i.e. delirium tremens), and is often accompanied by visual hallucinations of insects. It can also occur as a symptom of benzodiazepine withdrawal, withdrawal from medication such as SSRI/SNRI antidepressants and tramadol; and as a side effect of opioid analgesics.

== History ==
Formication is etymologically derived from the Latin word formica, meaning "ant", precisely because of this similarity in sensation to that of crawling insects. The term has been in use for several hundred years. In the 1797 edition of the Encyclopædia Britannica, a description of the condition raphania includes the symptom:

...a formication, or sensation as of ants or other small insects creeping on the parts.

Described again in an instructional text from 1890:

A variety of itching, often encountered in the eczema of elderly people, is formication; this is described as exactly like the crawling of myriads of animals over the skin. It is probably due to the successive irritation of nerve fibrils in the skin. At times patients who suffer from it will scarcely be persuaded that it is not due to insects. Yielding to the temptation to scratch invariably makes the disease worse.

== See also ==
- Delusional parasitosis
- Antipruritics – anti-itch drugs
- Morgellons
