= Kappa effect =

Perceptual error in judging the time between stimuli

The kappa effect or perceptual time dilation is a temporal perceptual illusion that can arise when observers judge the elapsed time between sensory stimuli applied sequentially at different locations. In perceiving a sequence of consecutive stimuli, subjects tend to overestimate the elapsed time between two successive stimuli when the distance between the stimuli is sufficiently large, and to underestimate the elapsed time when the distance is sufficiently small.

== In different sensory modalities ==
The kappa effect can occur with visual (e.g., flashes of light), auditory (e.g., tones), or tactile (e.g. taps to the skin) stimuli. Many studies of the kappa effect have been conducted using visual stimuli. For example, suppose three light sources, X, Y, and Z, are flashed successively in the dark with equal time intervals between each of the flashes. If the light sources are placed at different positions, with X and Y closer together than Y and Z, the temporal interval between the X and Y flashes is perceived to be shorter than that between the Y and Z flashes. The kappa effect has also been demonstrated with auditory stimuli that move in frequency. However, in some experimental paradigms the auditory kappa effect has not been observed. For example, Roy et al. (2011) found that, opposite to the prediction of the kappa effect, "Increasing the distance between sound sources marking time intervals leads to a decrease of the perceived duration". In touch, the kappa effect was first described as the "S-effect" by Suto (1952). Goldreich (2007) refers to the kappa effect as "perceptual time dilation" in analogy with the physical time dilation of the theory of relativity.

== Theories based in velocity expectation ==
Physically, traversed space and elapsed time are linked by velocity. Accordingly, several theories regarding the brain's expectations about stimulus velocity have been put forward to account for the kappa effect.

=== Constant velocity expectation ===
According to the constant velocity hypothesis proposed by Jones and Huang (1982), the brain incorporates a prior expectation of speed when judging spatiotemporal intervals. Specifically, the brain expects temporal intervals that would produce constant velocity (i.e., uniform motion) movement. Thus, the kappa effect occurs when we apply our knowledge of motion to stimulus sequences, which sometimes leads us to make mistakes. Evidence for the role of a uniform motion expectation in temporal perception comes from a study in which participants observed eight white dots that successively appeared in one direction in a horizontal alignment along a straight line. When the temporal separation was constant and the spatial separation between the dots varied, they observed the kappa effect, which follows the constant velocity hypothesis. However, when both the temporal and spatial separation between the dots varied, they failed to observe the response pattern that the constant velocity hypothesis predicts. A possible explanation is that it is difficult to perceive a uniform motion from such varying, complicated patterns; thus, the context of observed events may affect our temporal perception.

=== Low-speed expectation ===
A Bayesian perceptual model replicates the tactile kappa effect and other tactile spatiotemporal illusions, including the tau effect and the cutaneous rabbit illusion. According to this model, brain circuitry encodes the expectation that tactile stimuli tend to move slowly. The Bayesian model reaches an optimal probabilistic inference by combining uncertain spatial and temporal sensory information with a prior expectation for low-speed movement. The expectation that stimuli tend to move slowly results in the perceptual overestimation of the time elapsed between rapidly successive taps applied to separate skin locations. Simultaneously, the model perceptually underestimates the spatial separation between stimuli, thereby reproducing the cutaneous rabbit illusion and the tau effect. Goldreich (2007) speculated that a Bayesian slow-speed prior might explain the visual kappa effect as well the tactile one. Recent empirical studies support this suggestion.

=== Motion in different contexts ===
The kappa effect appears to depend strongly on phenomenal rather than physical extent. The kappa effect gets bigger as stimuli move faster. Observers tend to apply their previous knowledge of motion to a sequence of stimuli. When subjects observed vertically arranged stimuli, the kappa effect was stronger for sequences moving downward. This can be attributed to the expectation of downward acceleration and upward deceleration, in that the perceived accelerated downward motion causes us to underestimate temporal separation judgments.

== Related illusions ==
If observers interpret rapid stimulus sequences in light of an expectation regarding velocity, then it would be expected that not only temporal, but also spatial illusions would result. This indeed occurs in the tau effect, when the spatial separation between stimuli is constant and the temporal separation is varied. In this case, the observer decreases the judgment of spatial separation as temporal separation decreases, and vice versa. For example, when equally spaced light sources X, Y, and Z are flashed successively in the dark with a shorter time between X and Y than between Y and Z, X and Y are perceived to be closer together in space than are Y and Z. Goldreich (2007) linked the tau and kappa effects to the same underlying expectation regarding movement speed. He noted that, when stimuli move rapidly across space, "perception strikingly shrinks the intervening distance, and expands the elapsed time, between consecutive events". Goldreich (2007) termed these two fundamental perceptual distortions "perceptual length contraction" (tau effect) and "perceptual time dilation" (kappa effect) in analogy with the physical length contraction and time dilation of the theory of relativity. Perceptual length contraction and perceptual time dilation result from the same Bayesian observer model, one that expects stimuli to move slowly. Analogously, in the theory of relativity, length contraction and time dilation both occur when a physical speed (the speed of light) cannot be exceeded.
