= Tau effect =

Spatial perceptual illusion

The tau effect is a spatial perceptual illusion that arises when observers judge the distance between consecutive stimuli in a stimulus sequence. When the distance from one stimulus to the next is constant, and the time elapsed from one stimulus to the next is also constant, subjects tend to judge the distances, correctly, as equal. However, if the distance from one stimulus to the next is constant, but the time elapsed from one stimulus to the next is not constant, then subjects tend to misperceive the interval that has the shorter temporal interval as also having a shorter spatial interval. Thus, the tau effect reveals that stimulus timing affects the perception of stimulus spacing. Time is also a perceived quantity and subject to its own illusions; research indicates that in the tau effect, perceived stimulus spacing follows perceived (phenomenal) time rather than actual (physical) time.

== In different sensory modalities ==
The tau effect can occur with visual, auditory, or tactile stimuli. In touch, the tau effect was first described by Gelb (1914). It was later given its name by Helson (1930) and characterized in detail by Helson and King (1931). In addition to the unimodal (i.e., purely visual, auditory, or tactile) tau effect, crossmodal tau effects can occur. For instance, Kawabe et al. (2008) showed that the time intervals between auditory tones could affect subjects' perceptual judgements of the spatial interval between visual flashes in a manner consistent with that predicted by the tau effect.

== Theories based in velocity expectation ==
Physically, traversed space and elapsed time are linked by velocity. It is logical, then, to consider that the tau effect occurs as a consequence of the brain's assumption regarding stimulus velocity. Indeed, different theories regarding the brain's expectations about stimulus velocity have been put forward in an effort to explain the tau effect.

=== Constant velocity hypothesis ===
According to the constant velocity hypothesis proposed by Jones and Huang (1982), perception incorporates a prior expectation for constant speed. Therefore, given the temporal intervals marked by sequential stimuli, the brain expects spatial intervals that would yield constant velocity movement (i.e., uniform motion). One limitation of this theory, pointed out by Goldreich (2007), is that it does not explain why even two stimuli pressed in rapid succession against the skin are perceived as closer together the shorter the temporal interval between them is. In the absence of a third stimulus that creates a second spatial and temporal interval, the constant velocity hypothesis can have no bearing on this two-stimulus situation.

=== Low-speed expectation ===
According to a tactile Bayesian perceptual model put forward by Goldreich (2007), the brain expects that tactile stimuli tend to move slowly. The Bayesian model reaches an optimal probabilistic inference by combining uncertain spatial and temporal sensory information with a prior expectation for low-speeds. The expectation that stimuli tend to move slowly results in the perceptual underestimation of the spatial separation between rapidly consecutive stimuli ("perceptual length contraction"), thereby reproducing the tau effect and related illusions.

Unlike the constant velocity hypothesis, the Bayesian model replicates the underestimation in perceived distance that occurs even when only two stimuli are presented in rapid succession. For the case of two taps to the skin, the Bayesian model perceives the length between taps, l*, to be a function of the actual length, l, and the elapsed time, t:

l* = l/(1 + 2(τ/t)^{2})

The parameter tau (τ) is proportional to the observer's spatial uncertainty (specifically, it is the spatial standard deviation divided by the low-speed prior standard deviation). Consistent with this model, Tong et al. (2016) showed that stimulus pairs consisting of weaker taps, which are localized with greater uncertainty than stronger taps, result in more pronounced length contraction. Modeling the tau effect that occurs in the perception of 3-tap sequences, Goldreich and Tong (2013) compared the Bayesian model with a low-speed expectation to a Bayesian model with a low-acceleration expectation — similar to the constant-velocity hypothesis. They found that the low-speed prior model provided better fits to the human tactile tau effect data. When time is inaccurately perceived (i.e., because of the kappa effect), the Bayesian observer model judges stimulus spacing to follow perceived time rather than actual time, consistent with reports from human subjects.

== Related illusions ==
A spatial perceptual illusion that seems to be closely related to the tau effect is the rabbit illusion. In the tactile rabbit illusion, a rapid sequence of taps delivered first near the wrist and then near the elbow creates the sensation of sequential taps hopping up the arm from the wrist towards the elbow, although no physical stimulus was applied between the two actual stimulus locations. Like the tau effect, the rabbit illusion has been observed not just in touch, but also in audition and vision.

If observers interpret rapid stimulus sequences in light of an expectation regarding velocity, then it would be expected that not only spatial, but also temporal illusions would result. This indeed occurs in the kappa effect: When the temporal separation between stimuli is constant and the spatial separation is varied, the observer's temporal interval judgment is influenced by the spatial distance between consecutive stimuli. Specifically, longer spatial intervals are perceived to occupy longer temporal intervals. The kappa effect is therefore the temporal perceptual analog of the tau effect.

Goldreich (2007) linked the tau, rabbit, and kappa effects to the same underlying expectation regarding movement speed. He noted that, when stimuli move rapidly across space, "perception strikingly shrinks the intervening distance, and expands the elapsed time, between consecutive events". Goldreich (2007) termed these two fundamental perceptual distortions "perceptual length contraction" (tau effect, rabbit illusion) and "perceptual time dilation" (kappa effect) in analogy with the physical length contraction and time dilation of theory of relativity. Perceptual length contraction and perceptual time dilation result from the same Bayesian observer model, one that expects stimuli to move slowly. Analogously, in the theory of relativity, length contraction and time dilation both occur when a physical speed (the speed of light) cannot be exceeded.

== See also ==
- General tau theory
