= Cutaneous rabbit illusion =

Tactile illusion

The cutaneous rabbit illusion (also known as cutaneous saltation and sometimes the cutaneous rabbit effect or CRE) is a tactile illusion evoked by tapping two or more separate regions of the skin in rapid succession. The illusion is most readily evoked on regions of the body surface that have relatively poor spatial acuity, such as the forearm. A rapid sequence of taps delivered first near the wrist and then near the elbow creates the sensation of sequential taps hopping up the arm from the wrist towards the elbow, although no physical stimulus was applied between the two actual stimulus locations. Similarly, stimuli delivered first near the elbow then near the wrist evoke the illusory perception of taps hopping from elbow towards wrist. The illusion was discovered by Frank Geldard and Carl Sherrick of Princeton University, in the early 1970s, and further characterized by Geldard (1982) and in many subsequent studies. Geldard and Sherrick likened the perception to that of a rabbit hopping along the skin, giving the phenomenon its name. While the rabbit illusion has been most extensively studied in the tactile domain, analogous sensory saltation illusions have been observed in audition and vision. The word "saltation" refers to the leaping or jumping nature of the percept.

== Experimental studies ==
From the moment of its discovery, the cutaneous rabbit illusion piqued the curiosity of researchers, and many experiments investigating the effect have been conducted, most of them on the forearm. Studies have consistently shown that the rabbit illusion occurs only when successive taps are closely spaced in time; the illusion disappears if the temporal separation between taps exceeds about 0.3 seconds (300 milliseconds). A study showed that attention directed to one skin location reduces the perceptual migration of a tap placed at the attended location. Another study showed that the illusory taps are associated with neural activity in the same area of the brain's sensory map that is activated by real taps to the skin. Nevertheless, the specific neural mechanisms that underlie the rabbit illusion are unknown. Many interesting instantiations of the cutaneous rabbit illusion have been observed. The illusion is not just confined to the "body". When subjects supported a stick across their index fingertips and received the taps via the stick, they reported sensing the illusory taps along the stick. This suggests that the cutaneous rabbit effect involves not only the intrinsic somatotopic representation but also the representation of the extended body schema that results from body-object interactions. Research has shown that the illusion can occur across non-contiguous body regions such as the fingers. However, a subpopulation of participants apparently does not experience the effect on the fingertips. The illusion has also been shown to occur both within and across the arms, suggesting that the illusion occurs after perceptual stages in the brain. Visual cues—light flashes placed at particular locations along the arm—can influence the cutaneous rabbit illusion. In addition, auditory and tactile stimuli can interact in the rabbit illusion. In 2009, researchers of Philips Electronics demonstrated a jacket lined with actuator motors and designed to evoke various tactile sensations while watching a movie. The device takes advantage of the cutaneous rabbit illusion to reduce the number of actuators needed. In keeping with the prediction of a Bayesian model, the perceptual attraction between the stimulus points is enhanced when the stimuli are made weaker.

== Explanation ==
Computational models have been put forward by several authors in an effort to explain the origins of the cutaneous rabbit illusion.

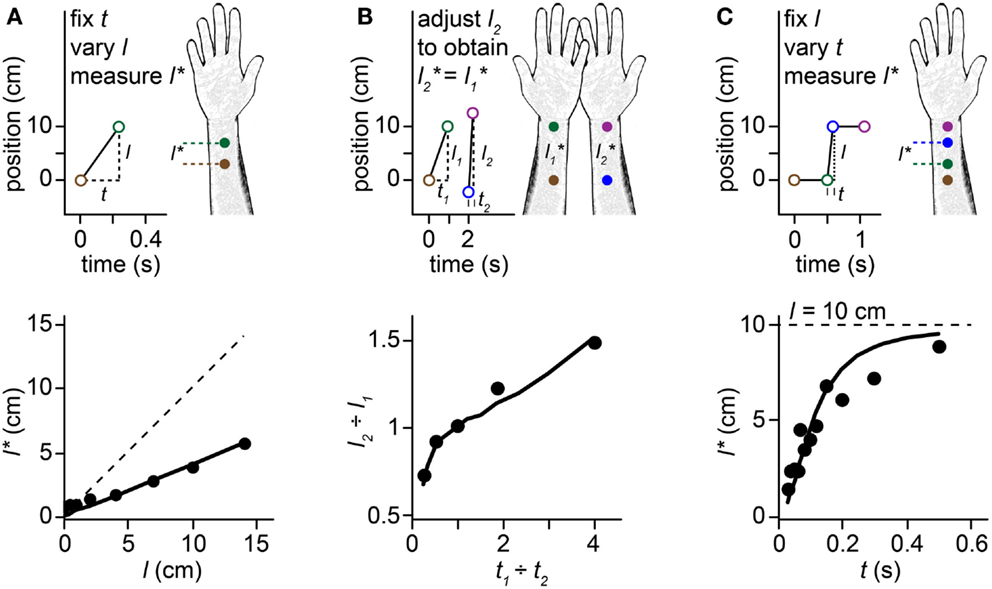
Perception underestimates the distance between successive taps to the skin. Stimuli are illustrated in the upper panels, along with their perception (forearm sketches). Corresponding human data and Bayesian model fits are plotted in the lower panels. For details, see Goldreich & Tong (2013).

A Bayesian perceptual model closely replicates the cutaneous rabbit and other tactile spatiotemporal illusions. According to this model, brain circuitry encodes the expectation, acquired through sensory experience, that tactile stimuli tend to be stationary or to move only slowly. The Bayesian model reaches an optimal probabilistic inference by combining uncertain spatial sensory information with a prior expectation for low-speed movement (a Gaussian prior distribution over velocity, with mean 0). The expectation that stimuli tend to move slowly results in the perceptual conclusion that rapidly successive stimuli are more likely to be closer together on the skin.

The Bayesian model was further developed and shown to replicate the perception of humans to both simple (e.g., two-tap) and more complex (multi-tap) stimulus sequences, such as the 3-tap tau effect and the 15-tap rabbit illusion. The Bayesian model replicates the effects of selective spatial attention on the rabbit illusion percept and is compatible with both the out-of-body rabbit illusion and crossmodal influences on the rabbit illusion. Perceptual prediction and postdiction are emergent properties of the Bayesian model. A freeware computer program, Leaping Lagomorphs, implements the Bayesian model.

For the case of two taps to the skin, the Bayesian model perceives the length between taps, l*, to be a function of the actual length, l, and the elapsed time, t:

l* = l/(1 + 2(τ/t)^{2})

This is the perceptual length contraction formula, so-named in analogy with the physical length contraction described in the theory of relativity. Note that, just as observed in rabbit illusion experiments, the formula shows that l* underestimates l to a greater extent when t is made smaller; as t becomes large, l* approaches l and the illusion disappears. The model's parameter, tau (τ), is a time constant for tactile space perception; the value of tau determines how rapidly the perceived length approaches the actual length as the time between stimuli, t, is increased. The perceived length equals one-third the actual length when t = τ, and two-thirds the actual length when t = 2τ.

Goldreich and Tong (2013) showed that tau is the ratio of the observer's low-speed expectation and tactile spatial acuity; they estimated the value of tau to be approximately 0.1 s on the forearm. A novel prediction of the Bayesian model, pointed out by Goldreich and Tong (2013), is that the amount of length contraction experienced will depend on the intensity of a tactile stimulus: lighter taps, which are more difficult to localize, should produce larger tau values and therefore more length contraction. Tong et al. (2016) confirmed this prediction experimentally.

== Related illusions ==
An illusion that appears to be closely related to the rabbit illusion is the tau effect. The tau effect arises when an observer judges the distance between consecutive stimuli in a sequence. If the distance from one stimulus to the next is constant, but the time elapsed from one stimulus to the next is not constant, then subjects tend to perceive the interval that is shorter in time as also being shorter in distance. Thus, like the rabbit illusion, the tau effect reveals that stimulus timing affects the perception of stimulus spacing. Goldreich (2007) proposed that the cutaneous rabbit illusion and the tau effect both result from the same low-speed prior expectation. Indeed, the same Bayesian model—characterized by the perceptual length contraction formula above—replicates both effects. Another illusion that is plausibly related to the cutaneous rabbit and the tau effect is the kappa effect. The kappa effect (or perceptual time dilation) is in essence the converse of the tau effect: the longer of two spatial intervals between stimuli is perceived to be longer in time. Goldreich (2007) showed that, under conditions of temporal as well as spatial uncertainty, the Bayesian model produces the kappa effect. The perceptual length contraction formula in that case still applies, but the "t" in the formula refers to perceived rather than actual time.
