= Myoclonus =

Involuntary, irregular muscle twitch

- A person with a myoclonus following a peripheral nerve block
- Specialty: Neurology

Myoclonus is a brief, involuntary, irregular (lacking rhythm) twitching of a muscle, a joint, or a group of muscles, different from clonus, which is rhythmic or regular. Myoclonus (myo- "muscle", clonus "spasm") describes a medical sign and, generally, is not a diagnosis of a disease. It belongs to the hyperkinetic movement disorders, among tremor and chorea for example. These myoclonic twitches, jerks, or seizures are usually caused by sudden muscle contractions (positive myoclonus) or brief lapses of contraction (negative myoclonus). The most common circumstance under which they occur is while falling asleep (hypnic jerk). Myoclonic jerks occur in healthy people and are experienced occasionally by everyone. However, when they appear with more persistence and become more widespread they can be a sign of various neurological disorders. Hiccups are a kind of myoclonic jerk specifically affecting the diaphragm. When a spasm is triggered by an external stimulus, it is known as a provoked spasm. Shuddering attacks in babies fall in this category.

Myoclonic jerks may occur alone or in sequence, in a pattern or without pattern. They may occur infrequently or many times each minute. Most often, myoclonus is one of several signs in a wide variety of nervous system disorders such as multiple sclerosis, Parkinson's disease, dystonia, cerebral palsy, Alzheimer's disease, Gaucher's disease, subacute sclerosing panencephalitis, Creutzfeldt–Jakob disease (CJD), serotonin toxicity, some cases of Huntington's disease, some forms of epilepsy, and occasionally in intracranial hypotension.

In almost all instances in which myoclonus is caused by central nervous system disease it is preceded by other symptoms; for instance, in CJD it is generally a late-stage clinical feature that appears after the patient has already started to exhibit gross neurological deficits.

Anatomically, myoclonus may originate from lesions of the cortex, subcortex or spinal cord. The presence of myoclonus above the foramen magnum effectively excludes spinal myoclonus; further localisation relies on further investigation with electromyography (EMG) and electroencephalography (EEG).

== Types ==
The most common types of myoclonus include action, cortical reflex, essential, palatal, those seen in the progressive myoclonus epilepsies, reticular reflex, sleep and stimulus-sensitive.

=== Epilepsy forms ===
- Cortical reflex myoclonus is thought to be a type of epilepsy that originates in the cerebral cortex – the outer layer, or "gray matter", of the brain, responsible for much of the information processing that takes place in the brain. In this type of myoclonus, jerks usually involve only a few muscles in one part of the body, but jerks involving many muscles may occur. Cortical reflex myoclonus can be intensified when patients attempt to move in a certain way or perceive a particular sensation.
- Essential myoclonus occurs in the absence of epilepsy or other apparent abnormalities in the brain or nerves. It can occur randomly in people with no family history or among members of the same family, indicating that it sometimes may be an inherited disorder. Essential myoclonus tends to be stable without increasing in severity over time. Some scientists speculate that some forms of essential myoclonus may be a type of epilepsy with no known cause.
- Juvenile myoclonic epilepsy (JME) usually consists of jerking and muscle twitches of the upper extremities. This may include the arms, shoulders, elbows, and very rarely, the legs. JME is among the most common types of epilepsy and can affect one of every 14 people with the disease. These seizures typically occur shortly after waking up. Onset for JME can be seen around puberty for most patients. Administration of medications that also treat multiple seizure types is usually the most effective form of treatment.
- Lennox–Gastaut syndrome (LGS), or childhood epileptic encephalopathy, is a rare epileptic disorder accounting for 1–4% of childhood epilepsies. The syndrome has much more severe symptoms ranging from multiple seizures daily, learning disabilities, and abnormal findings in electroencephalograms (EEG). Earlier age of seizure onset is correlated with a higher risk of cognitive impairment.
- Progressive myoclonus epilepsy (PME) is a group of diseases characterized by myoclonus, epileptic seizures, tonic–clonic seizures, and other serious symptoms such as trouble walking or speaking. These rare disorders often get worse over time and can be fatal. Studies have identified at least three forms of PME. Lafora disease is inherited as an autosomal recessive disorder, meaning that the disease occurs only when a child inherits two copies of a defective gene, one from each parent. Lafora disease is characterized by myoclonus, epileptic seizures, and dementia (progressive loss of memory and other intellectual functions). A second group of PME diseases belonging to the class of cerebral storage diseases usually involves myoclonus, visual problems, dementia, and dystonia (sustained muscle contractions that cause twisting movements or abnormal postures). Another group of PME disorders in the class of system degenerations often is accompanied by action myoclonus, seizures, and problems with balance and walking. Many of these PME diseases begin in childhood or adolescence. Treatment is not normally successful for any extended period of time.
- Reticular reflex myoclonus is thought to be a type of generalized epilepsy that originates in the brainstem, the part of the brain that connects to the spinal cord and controls vital functions such as breathing and heartbeat. Myoclonic jerks usually affect the whole body, with muscles on both sides of the body affected simultaneously. In some people, myoclonic jerks occur in only a part of the body, such as the legs, with all the muscles in that part being involved in each jerk. Reticular reflex myoclonus can be triggered by either a voluntary movement or an external stimulus.

=== Diaphragmatic flutter ===
A very rare form includes the diaphragmatic flutter, the Belly Dancer's Syndrome, or Van Leeuwenhoek's disease. It was first described by Antonie van Leeuwenhoek in 1723, who had it. The condition characterizes spoken communication that sounds like a short-breathed hiccup. These muscle spasms can recur dozens of times per day. Rate of diaphragmatic contraction ranges between 35 and 480 contractions per minute, with the average rate found to be 150. Studies show that possible causes include disruptions within the central or peripheral nervous systems, anxiety, nutritional disorder, and certain pharmaceuticals. No single treatment has proven effective, though blocking or crushing of the phrenic nerve can provide instantaneous relief when pharmacologic treatment has proven ineffective.

Only about 50 people in the world have been diagnosed with diaphragmatic flutter.

=== Other forms ===
- Action myoclonus is characterized by muscular jerking triggered or intensified by voluntary movement or even the intention to move. It may be made worse by attempts at precise, coordinated movements. Action myoclonus is the most disabling form of myoclonus and can affect the arms, legs, face, and even the voice. It is often associated with tonic-clonic seizures and diffuse neuronal disease such as post-hypoxic encephalopathy, uremia, and the various forms of PME, although, in the case of focal cerebral damage, the disease may be restricted to one limb. This type of myoclonus often is caused by brain damage that results from a lack of oxygen and blood flow to the brain when breathing or heartbeat is temporarily stopped. Over-excitement of the sensorimotor cortex (cortical reflex myoclonus) or reticular formation (reticular reflex myoclonus) is also a cause of action myoclonus. Serotonin and GABA neurotransmitters are thought to cause this lack of inhibition, which is a possible explanation as to why improvements are made with the administration of serotonin precursors. Systems involved include the cerebellodentatorubral, pyramidal, extrapyramidal, optic, auditory, posterior columns and gracile and cuneate nuclei, spinocerebellar tracts, motor neurons of cranial nerves and anterior horns, and muscle fibers.
- Palatal myoclonus is a regular, rhythmic contraction of one or both sides of the rear of the roof of the mouth, called the soft palate. These contractions may be accompanied by myoclonus in other muscles, including those in the face, tongue, throat, and diaphragm. The contractions are very rapid, occurring as often as 150 times a minute, and may persist during sleep. The condition usually appears in adults and can last indefinitely. People with palatal myoclonus usually regard it as a minor problem; some complain of an occasional "clicking" sound, a noise made as the soft palate muscles contract.
- Middle ear myoclonus occurs in the muscles of the middle ear. These muscles may include the tensor tympani and stapedius muscles. It can involve the muscles surrounding the Eustachian tube, which include the tensor veli palatini, levator veli palatini, and salpingopharyngeus. Those affected describe it as a thumping sound or sensation in the ear.
- Spinal myoclonus is myoclonus originating in the spinal cord, including segmental and propriospinal myoclonus. The latter is usually due to a thoracic generator producing truncal flexion jerk. It is often stimulus-induced with a delay due to the slow conducting propriospinal nerve fibers.
- Stimulus-sensitive myoclonus is triggered by a variety of external events, including noise, movement, and light. Surprise may increase the sensitivity of the patient.
- Sleep myoclonus occurs during the initial phases of sleep, especially at the moment of dropping off to sleep, and include familiar examples of myoclonus such as the hypnic jerk. Some forms appear to be stimulus-sensitive. Some people with sleep myoclonus are rarely troubled by it, or need treatment. If it is a symptom of more complex and disturbing sleep disorders, such as restless legs syndrome, it may require medical treatment. Myoclonus can be associated with patients with Tourette syndrome.

== Signs and symptoms ==
Myoclonic seizure can be described as "jumps" or "jolts" experienced in a single extremity or even the entire body. The feeling experienced by the individual is described as uncontrollable jolts common to receiving a mild electric shock. The sudden jerks and twitching of the body can often be so severe that it can cause a small child to fall.

A myoclonic seizure (myo "muscle", clonic "jerk") is a sudden involuntary contraction of muscle groups. The muscle jerks consist of symmetric, mostly generalized jerks, localized in the arms and in the shoulders and also simultaneously with a head nod; both the arms may fling out together and simultaneously a head nod may occur. Symptoms have some variability amongst subjects. Sometimes the entire body may jerk, just like a startle response. As is the case with all generalised seizures, the patient is not conscious during the event but the seizure is so brief that the person appears to remain fully conscious.

In reflex epilepsies, myoclonic seizures can be brought on by flashing lights or other environmental triggers (see photosensitive epilepsy).

Familiar examples of normal myoclonus include hiccups and hypnic jerks that some people experience while drifting off to sleep. Severe cases of pathologic myoclonus can distort movement and severely limit a person's ability to sleep, eat, talk, and walk. Myoclonic jerks commonly occur in individuals with epilepsy.

== Causes ==
Myoclonus in healthy individuals may indicate nothing other than arbitrary muscle contraction.

Myoclonus may also develop in response to infection, hyperosmolar hyperglycemic state, head or spinal cord injury, stroke, stress, brain tumors, kidney or liver failure, lipid storage disease, chemical or drug poisoning, as a side effect of certain drugs (such as tramadol, quinolones, benzodiazepines, gabapentin, sertraline, lamotrigine, and opioids), or other disorders.

Myoclonus can be a symptom of a wide variety of nervous system disorders. These include:

- multiple sclerosis,
- epilepsy,
- Parkinson's disease,
- Huntington's disease,
- Lewy body dementia,
- Alzheimer's disease,
- Frontotemporal dementia,
- Corticobasal degeneration,
- Creutzfeldt–Jakob disease
- Lyme disease,
- opsoclonus myoclonus,
- lupus and
- MERRF (Myoclonic Epilepsy with Ragged Red Fibers), a rare mitochondrial encephalomyopathy.

Nocturnal myoclonus can be present in people with fibromyalgia.

Benign myoclonic movements are commonly seen during the induction of general anesthesia with intravenous medications such as etomidate and propofol. These are postulated to result from decreased inhibitory signaling from cranial neurons. Prolonged oxygen deprivation to the brain, hypoxia, may result in posthypoxic myoclonus. People with benign fasciculation syndrome can often experience myoclonic jerking of limbs, fingers and thumbs.

Jerks of muscle groups, much of the body, or a series in rapid succession, which results in the person jerking bolt upright from a more relaxed sitting position is sometimes seen in ambulatory patients being treated with high doses of morphine, hydromorphone, and similar drugs, and is possibly a sign of high and/or rapidly increasing serum levels of these drugs. Myoclonic jerks caused by other opioids, such as tramadol and pethidine, may be less benign. Medications unrelated to opioids, such as anticholinergics, are known to cause myoclonic jerks.

== Pathophysiology ==
Most myoclonus is caused by a disturbance of the central nervous system. Some are from peripheral nervous system injury. Studies suggest several locations in the brain are involved in myoclonus. One is in the brainstem, close to structures that are responsible for the startle response, an automatic reaction to an unexpected stimulus involving rapid muscle contraction.

The specific mechanisms underlying myoclonus are not yet fully understood. Scientists believe that some types of stimulus-sensitive myoclonus may involve overexcitability of the parts of the brain that control movement. These parts are interconnected in a series of feedback loops called motor pathways. These pathways facilitate and modulate communication between the brain and muscles. Key elements of this communication are chemicals known as neurotransmitters, which carry messages from one nerve cell, or neuron, to another. Neurotransmitters are released by neurons and attach themselves to receptors on parts of neighboring cells. Some neurotransmitters may make the receiving cell more sensitive, while others tend to make the receiving cell less sensitive. Laboratory studies suggest that an imbalance between these chemicals may underlie myoclonus.

Some researchers speculate that abnormalities or deficiencies in the receptors for certain neurotransmitters may contribute to some forms of myoclonus. Receptors that appear to be related to myoclonus include those for two important inhibitory neurotransmitters: serotonin, which constricts blood vessels and brings on sleep, and gamma-aminobutyric acid (GABA), which helps the brain maintain muscle control. Other receptors with links to myoclonus include those for glycine, an inhibitory neurotransmitter that is important for the control of motor and sensory functions in the spinal cord, and those affected by benzodiazepines, a variety of medication that usually induces sleep. More research is needed to determine how these receptor abnormalities cause or contribute to myoclonus.

== Treatment ==
Symptomatic treatment may be made. Combinations of drugs may be used to control myoclonus.

Concerning more serious conditions, the complex origins of myoclonus may be treated with multiple drugs, which have a limited effect individually, but greater when combined with others that act on different brain pathways or mechanisms. Treatment is most effective when the underlying cause is known, and can be treated as such. Some drugs being studied in different combinations include clonazepam, sodium valproate, piracetam, and primidone. Hormonal therapy may improve responses to antimyoclonic drugs in some people.

Some studies have shown that doses of 5-hydroxytryptophan (5-HTP) leads to improvement in patients with some types of action myoclonus and PME. These differences in the effect of 5-HTP on patients with myoclonus have not yet been explained.

Many of the drugs used for myoclonus, such as barbiturates, phenytoin and primidone, are also used to treat epilepsy. Barbiturates slow down the central nervous system and cause tranquilizing or antiseizure effects. Phenytoin and primidone are effective antiepileptics drugs, although phenytoin can cause liver failure or have other harmful long-term effects in patients with PME. Sodium valproate is an alternative therapy for myoclonus and can be used either alone or in combination with clonazepam. Some people have adverse reactions to clonazepam and/or sodium valproate.

When patients are taking multiple medications, the discontinuation of drugs suspected of causing myoclonus and treatment of metabolic derangements may resolve some cases of myoclonus. When pharmacological treatment is indicated anticonvulsants are the main line of treatment. Paradoxical reactions to treatment are notable. Drugs which most people respond to may in other individuals worsen their symptoms. Sometimes this leads to the mistake of increasing the dose, rather than decreasing or stopping the drug. Treatment of myoclonus focuses on medications that may help reduce symptoms. Drugs used include sodium valproate, clonazepam, the anticonvulsant levetiracetam, and piracetam. Dosages of clonazepam usually are increased gradually until the patient improves or side effects become harmful. Drowsiness and loss of coordination are common side effects. The beneficial effects of clonazepam may diminish over time if the patient develops a tolerance to the drug.

In forms of myoclonus where only a single area is affected, and even in a few other various forms, Botox injections (OnabotulinumtoxinA) may be helpful. The chemical messenger responsible for triggering the involuntary muscle contractions is blocked by the Botulinum toxins of the Botox.

Surgery is also a viable option for treatment if the symptoms are caused by a tumor or lesion in the brain or spinal cord. Surgery may also correct symptoms in those where myoclonus affects parts of the face or ear. While DBS is still being studied for use with myoclonus, Deep Brain Stimulation has also been tried in those with this and other movement disorders.

== Epidemiology ==
Myoclonus can occur in people with no family history, but also among members of the same family. Some people with myoclonus have family members who experience essential tremor or dystonia (myoclonus-dystonia).

== Prognosis ==
The effects of myoclonus in an individual can vary depending on the form and the overall health of the individual. In severe cases, particularly those indicating an underlying disorder in the brain or nerves, movement can be extremely distorted and limit ability to normally function, such as in eating, talking, and walking. In these cases, treatment that is usually effective, such as clonazepam and sodium valproate, may instead cause adverse reaction to the drug, including increased tolerance and a greater need for increase in dosage. However, the prognosis for more simple forms of myoclonus in otherwise healthy individuals may be neutral, as the disease may cause few to no difficulties. Other times the disease starts simply, in one region of the body, and then spreads.

== Research ==
Research on myoclonus is supported through the National Institute of Neurological Disorders and Stroke (NINDS). The primary focus of research is on the role of neurotransmitters and receptors involved in the disease. Identifying whether or not abnormalities in these pathways cause myoclonus may help in efforts to develop drug treatments and diagnostic tests. Determining the extent that genetics play in these abnormalities may lead to potential treatments for their reversal, potentially correcting the loss of inhibition while enhancing mechanisms in the body that would compensate for their effects.

== Etymology ==
The word myoclonus uses combining forms of myo- and clonus, indicating muscle contraction dysfunction. It is pronounced /ˌmaɪˈɒklənəs/ or /ˌmaɪəˈkloʊnəs, ˌmaɪoʊ-/ (Note: "Myoclonus". Oxford Dictionaries UK English Dictionary. Oxford University Press.). The prevalence of the variants shows division between American English and British English. The variant stressing the -oc- syllable is the only pronunciation given in a half dozen major American dictionaries (medical and general). The variant stressing the -clo- syllable is given in the British English module of Oxford Dictionaries online but not in the American English module.

== See also ==
- Antidepressant discontinuation syndrome – Symptoms that occur after discontinuing antidepressant medication
- Benign fasciculation syndrome – Involuntary muscle twitching in the voluntary muscles
- Clonus – Set of involuntary and rhythmic muscular contractions and relaxations
- Exploding head syndrome – Abnormal sensory perception during sleep
- Fahr's syndrome – Genetic disorder involving calcification of the basal ganglia
- Fasciculation – Spontaneous, involuntary muscle twitch
- Hypnagogia – State of consciousness leading into sleep
- Hypnic jerk – Involuntary twitching while falling asleep
- Periodic limb movement disorder – Sleep disorder
- Restless legs syndrome
