= Falling (sensation) =

Sensation

A sensation of falling occurs when the labyrinth or vestibular apparatus, a system of fluid-filled passages in the inner ear, detects changes in acceleration. This sensation can occur when a person begins to fall, which in terms of mechanics amounts to a sudden acceleration increase from zero to roughly 9.81 m/s^{2}. If the body is in free fall with no other momenta, there is no falling sensation. This almost never occurs in real-life falling situations because when the faller leaves their support there are usually very significant quantities of residual momenta such as rotation and these momenta continue as the person falls, causing a sensation of dysphoria. The faller doesn't fall straight down but spins, flips, etc. due to these residual momenta and also due to the asymmetric forces of air resistance on their asymmetric body. While velocity continues to increase, the downward acceleration due to gravity remains constant. Increasing drag force may even cause a feeling of ascent.

The vestibular apparatus also detects spatial orientation with respect to visual input. A similar sensation of falling can be induced when the eyes detect rapid apparent motion with respect to the environment. This system enables people to keep their balance by signalling when a physical correction is necessary. Some medical conditions, known as balance disorders, also induce the sensation of falling. In the early stages of sleep, a falling sensation may be perceived in connection with a hypnic jerk, sometimes awaking the sleeper abruptly.

== Labyrinth ==
The vestibular system works with other sensorimotor systems in the body, such as the visual system (eyes) and skeletal system (bones and joints), to check and maintain the position of our body at rest or in motion. The vestibular apparatus functions by detecting forces that act upon bodies including gravity. There are two sections in the labyrinth that are helpful for accomplishing those tasks: the semicircular canals and the otolithic organs.

== Balance disorder ==
A balance disorder is a condition that makes a person feel nausea, disorientation or dizziness as if moving, spinning or falling even though steady. Balance disorder can be caused by medication, problems of the inner ear or the brain.

== Hypnic jerk ==
Hypnic jerk, also called hypnagogic jerk, is a normal reaction that can be caused by anxiety, caffeine, a dream, or discomfort of sleeping. A hypnic jerk is the feeling triggered by a sudden muscle twitch, causing the feeling of falling while sleeping or dreaming. Hypnic jerks typically occur moments before the first stage of sleep. About 70% of people have experienced hypnic jerk. Hypnic jerks are most common in children, when dreams are considered the most simple.

== See also ==
- Depersonalization
- Derealization
- Sense of balance
