= The Dream: Introduction into the Psychology of Dreams =

1918 book by Herbert Silberer

The Dream – Introduction into the Psychology of Dreams
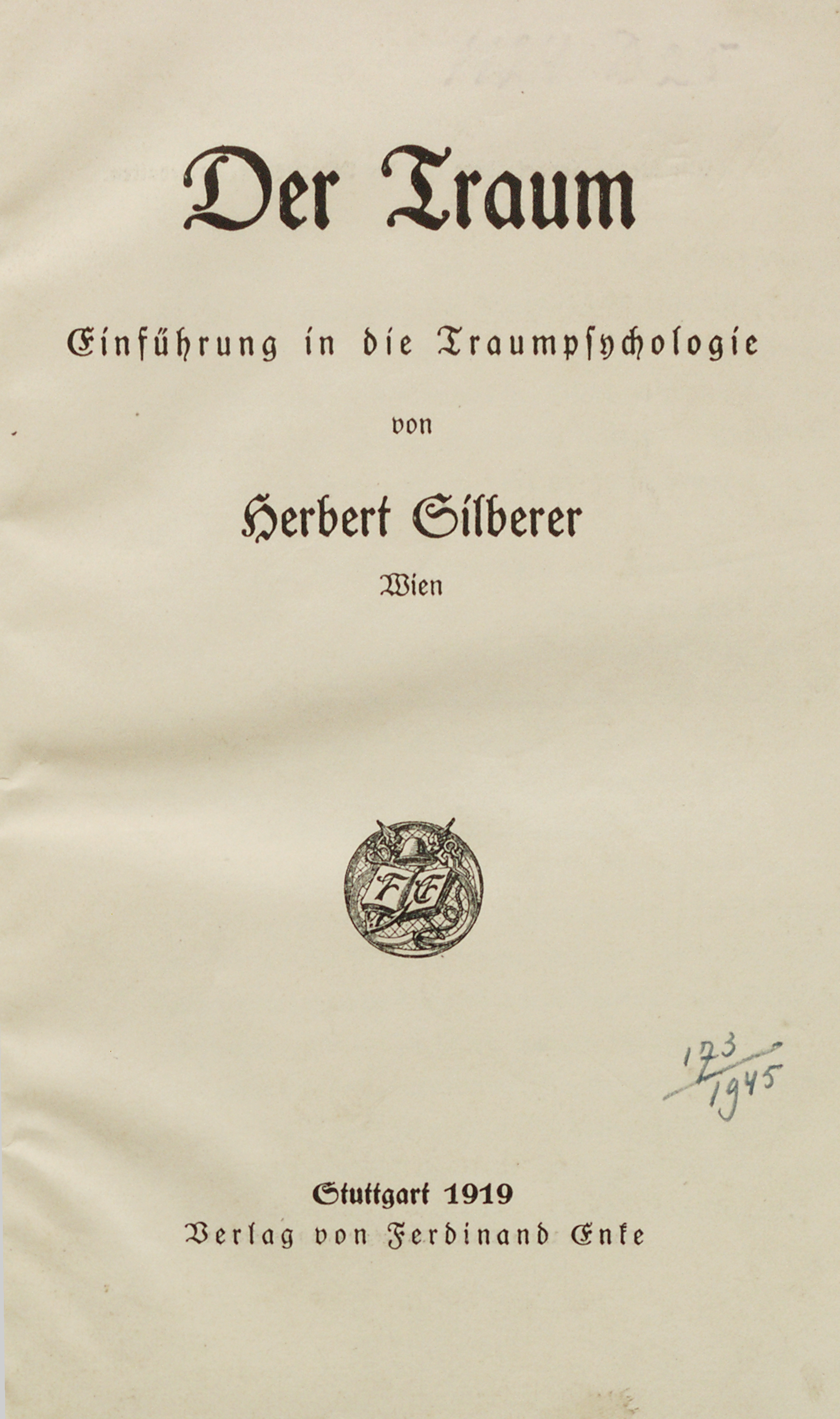
- Title page of the book
- Author: Herbert Silberer
- Language: German
- Subjects: Dream interpretation Psychoanalysis
- Publisher: Enke, Stuttgart
- Publication date: 1919
- Media type: Print
- Pages: 123 (first edition)
- OCLC: 905558848

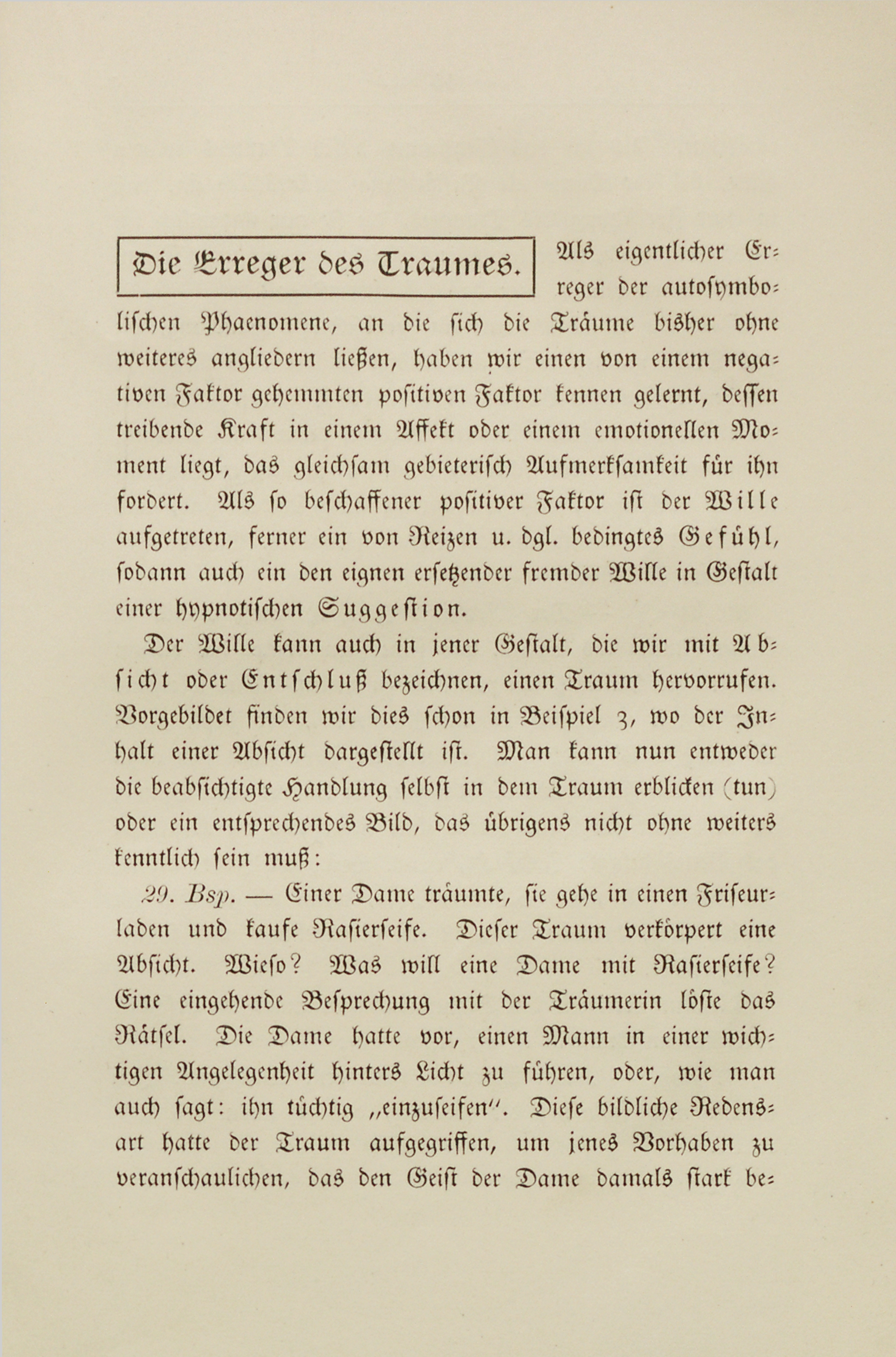
Scan of page 39 from the book

The Dream – Introduction into the Psychology of Dreams (German: Der Traum – Einführung in die Traumpsychologie) is a book by the Austrian psychoanalyst Herbert Silberer, written 1918 in Vienna and published 1919 by Ferdinand Enke in Stuttgart. His main intention was to provide a short, comprehensible guide on how to read and understand more sophisticated literature on dreams, as well as giving an appreciation of fundamental dream phenomena, because he considered both of them as lacking at this time. Silberer himself called this book the preamble for more sophisticated and complicated works, which could then build up on his own work.

== Background ==
The Dream was written in 1918, a time in which Europe had suffered from World War I for nearly four years already when it was finally about to come to an end. Furthermore, it originates from a period in which the field of psychology was greatly influenced by psychoanalytic theories of Sigmund Freud and like-minded psychologists. Especially since the publication of Freud's Interpretation of Dreams (Traumdeutung) in 1900, psychoanalysis in general, and dream interpretation in particular, became of increasing interest among professionals as well as laymen. Many people were fascinated by the putative meaning of their dreams and desired to discover their unconscious selves by means of interpreting them.

In the following years, Silberer noticed that while the literature on the interpretation of dreams was increasing in amount and complexity, general information on basic elements of dreams was deficient. Therefore, he began to give public lectures on fundamental knowledge about dreams as well as his specific findings in this field in Vienna. After various listeners of one of such lectures had assured him that he had succeeded in providing an understandable introduction into the psychology of dreams, Silberer decided to write it down, thereby creating the book The Dream.

Here, he builds up on his explorations and findings on limit states (Grenzustände) between sleep and wakefulness, also called hypnagogic states, which had encouraged him to write one of his first publications Report on a Method of Eliciting and Observing Certain Symbolic Hallucination-Phenomena (Bericht über eine Methode, gewisse symbolische Halluzinations-Erscheinungen hervorzurufen und zu beobachten) in 1909.

== Reception ==
Silberer's work on hypnagogic states, which is also discussed in the first part of The Dream, grasped the attention of Sigmund Freud, who advised C. G. Jung to arrange its publication in the Jahrbuch für psychoanalytische und psychopathologische Forschungen in 1909. In 1910, Silberer joined the circle around Freud, called the Vienna Psychoanalytic Society (Wiener Psychoanalytische Vereinigung (WPV)). Freud considered the work of Silberer, particularly his theories on symbolism, as a valuable contribution to his own research. He even included some of Silberer's findings in his own writings. However, it is documented that he called Silberer a Dégéneré (degenerated) in a letter to Jung. It is assumed that this titling is related to Silberer's poor mental health.

While Silberer and Freud drifted apart over the years, Jung highly appreciated Silberer's contribution to the theory of psychoanalysis. Being a pioneer in interpreting an alchemical text in a symbolic, psychologic and psychoanalytic way, Silberer formed a connecting link to Jung's symbolic, archetypal interpretation of dreams as well as his analytical theory. In his work Mysterium Conjunctionis Jung wrote: "Herbert Silberer has the merit of being the first to discover the secret threads that lead from alchemy to the psychology of the unconscious".

== Silberer and Freud ==
The relationship between Silberer and Freud became increasingly tensed when Silberer got into closer contact with Wilhelm Stekel and C. G. Jung, who both had distanced themselves from the Vienna Psychoanalytic Society by that time.

Also in terms of professional viewpoints Freud and Silberer drifted apart progressively. While Freud dedicated himself to his traditional Psychoanalysis, Silberer focused more and more on occult phenomena. Silberer's standpoint became the content of his main work: Problems of Mysticism and its Symbolism (Die Probleme der Mystik und ihrer Symbolik), published in 1914. Here, he depicted the Freudian analysis as too superficial, not going far enough into interpreting the inner psychological and spiritual meanings of dreams or mental processes. Freud, in turn, criticized Silberer for this affirmation of esotericism and mysticism.

In the introduction of The Dream, Silberer explicitly states that he made use of Freud's doctrine of Psychoanalysis. He emphasizes, however, that he based his writings on his own research. Furthermore, he stresses his intention to keep himself clean from the exaggerations that eager followers of the doctrine of Freud are accused of (German: auch bin ich bestrebt, mich der Uebertreibungen rein zu halten, die man allzu eifrigen Anhängern der Freudschen Lehre (mit einem Wort: der "Psychoanalyse") vorwirft). When the magazine Psyche and Eros, which was published by Silberer and Stekel from 1920 onwards, was said to have become anti-Freudian, both authors abdicated in 1922.

Following these growing discrepancies in terms of professional opinions, as well as increasing public tensions, Freud finally expressed his rejection of Silberer in a refusing letter, stating that he does not wish to stay in further contact. Several months later, in January 1923, Silberer committed suicide by hanging. It is debated in how far this act was related to the dismissal by Freud. It is believed that Silberer had long been suffering from loneliness, even though he was married, which eventually led to the development of a suicidal depression.

== Structure ==
The book consists of eight subparts that are grouped into two main parts. The first main part (subpart I.-III.) elementary phenomena of dreams are described. In the second part (subpart IV.–VIII.) the actual dream and its interpretation are addressed.

Each subpart introduces a fundamental characteristic of dreams, followed by an example that has been either experienced by Silberer himself or by one of his clients. Sometimes he also refers to cases by other psychoanalysts, as for example subjects studied by Freud or experimental studies conducted by Dr. Karl Schrötter. However, he describes all examples in a first-person account.

Each dream example is divided into a minimum of three aspects:

1. the condition whereby the context is outlined in which the dream occurred.
2. the scene, consisting of a detailed description of the actual plot and images that the dream consisted of and
3. the interpretation. Hereby Silberer provides the reader with an explanation of the dream based on the particular theory he just outlined. Later in the book, he also includes theories that have already been introduced, thereby constructing increasingly sophisticated dream interpretations.

== Content ==
In the first part of The Dream Silberer addresses the hallucination during semi-sleeping, also called the hypnagogic state. He further goes into detail on basic dream components like classes of symbols, multiple determination (mehrfache Determination), threshold symbolism (Schwellensymbolik) and the emotional moment (das emotionelle Moment).

In the following, he introduces experimental dreams, also called suggested dreams (suggerierte Träume), meaning that dreams are experimentally manipulated as for example by the use of body stimuli (Leibreize). Furthermore, recent impressions (rezente Eindrücke) and subjective facial sensations (Gesichtsempfindungen) are discussed.

Suggested dreams can be seen as so-called exciters (Erreger) of dreams. Other, more natural, exciters would be convenience, wishes, or immoral content. In this context, Silberer mentions Freud's theories on dreams and wishes and briefly elaborates on the actual analysis of dreams and regression. Also displacement, condensation and allusion (Anspielung), which also occur in Freuds The Interpretation of Dreams, are explained and exemplified.

A further component of dream analysis are higher value complexes (hochwertige Komplexe), and their readiness, as well as means of depiction (Darstellungsmittel) and the functional symbolism of dreams.

Silberer further shares his opinion on supererogation (Mehrleistung) of dreams, meaning the output of dreams that goes beyond the usual functioning of the mind (or soul). He concludes that, in contrast to the common view at that time, a dream does not actually possess increased capabilities regarding memory, unconscious operations, humour or spirit. However, to him dreaming seems to be related to enhanced sensitivity for some subtle impressions, as for example an upcoming illness or the processing of external impressions. In this context, he briefly addresses sleepwalking, prophetic dreams (Wahrträume) as well as telepathy.

Silberer ends his book by relating dreams to character. He states that each dreamer is responsible for the dreams he produces and therefore has to endure the consequences of these own creations. He agrees on the popular view that the dream can be called "the mirror of the character" or soul. He stresses, however, that it is the analysed dream, not the apparent one, that can tell something about the person and his or her character.
