= Arthur Walters =

Arthur Walters may refer to:

- Arthur Melmoth Walters (1865–1941), British footballer
- Arthur Scott Walters (born 1943), American physician
