= Hypnic jerk =

Involuntary twitching while falling asleep

- Other names: Hypnagogic jerk, sleep start, sleep twitch, night start
- Specialty: Sleep medicine
- Causes: Unknown
- Risk factors: Irregular sleep schedule, anxiety, excessive stimulant consumption, stress, smoking, antidepressants
- Diagnostic method: Based on symptoms
- Treatment: Medication, reducing stimulant consumption
- Medication: Clonazepam

A hypnic jerk is a brief and sudden involuntary contraction of the muscles of the body which occurs when a person is beginning to fall asleep, often causing the person to jump and awaken suddenly for a moment. Hypnic jerks are one form of involuntary muscle twitches called myoclonus.

Physically, hypnic jerks resemble the "jump" experienced by a person when startled, sometimes accompanied by a falling sensation. Hypnic jerks are associated with a rapid heartbeat, quickened breathing, sweat, and sometimes "a peculiar sensory feeling of 'shock' or 'falling into the void'". They can also be accompanied by vivid dream experiences or hallucinations. A higher occurrence is reported in people with irregular sleep schedules. When they are particularly frequent and severe, hypnic jerks have been reported as a cause of sleep-onset insomnia.

Hypnic jerks are common physiological phenomena. Around 70% of people experience them at least once in their lives, with 10% experiencing them daily. They are mostly benign and do not cause any neurological sequelae, though in severe cases, there can be pronounced negative effects on sleep time and quality.

== Causes ==
=== Risk factors ===
According to the American Academy of Sleep Medicine (AASM), there is a wide range of potential causes, including anxiety, stimulants like caffeine and nicotine, stress, and strenuous activities in the evening. It may also be facilitated by fatigue or sleep deprivation. Additionally, antidepressant usage has been noted as a potential risk factor for hypnic jerks. However, most hypnic jerks occur essentially at random in healthy people. Nevertheless, these repeated, intensifying twitches can cause anxiety in some individuals and a disruption to their sleep onset.

According to a study on sleep disturbances in the Journal of Neural Transmission, a hypnic jerk occurs during the non-rapid eye movement sleep cycle and is an "abrupt muscle action flexing movement, generalized or partial and asymmetric, which may cause arousal, with an illusion of falling".

=== Theories ===
The causes of hypnic jerk are unclear and are being studied. None of the several theories attempting to explain it have been fully accepted. One hypothesis posits that the hypnic jerk is a form of reflex, initiated in response to normal bodily events during the lead-up to the first stages of sleep, including a decrease in blood pressure and the relaxation of muscle tissue. Another theory postulates that the body mistakes the sense of relaxation that is felt when falling asleep as a sign that the body is physically falling. As a consequence, it causes a jerk motion to wake the sleeper up so they can catch themselves. A researcher at the University of Colorado suggested that a hypnic jerk could be "an archaic reflex to the brain's misinterpretation of muscle relaxation with the onset of sleep as a signal that a sleeping primate is falling out of a tree. The reflex may also have had selective value by having the sleeper readjust or review their sleeping position in a nest or on a branch in order to assure that a fall did not occur", but evidence is lacking.

== Diagnosis ==
Hypnic jerks are often mistaken for other forms of movement during sleep, including:

- Restless legs syndrome
- Periodic limb movement disorder
- Hypnagogic foot tremor
- Rhythmic movement disorder
- Hereditary or essential startle syndrome

Some phenomena can help to distinguish hypnic jerk from these other conditions. For example, the occurrence of hypnic jerk arises only at sleep onset and it happens without any rhythmicity or periodicity of the movements and EMG bursts. Other pertinent history can also be used to differentiate it.

This physiological phenomenon can also be mistaken for myoclonic seizure, but it can also be distinguished by different criteria, such as the fact that hypnic jerk occurs at sleep onset only or that the EEG is normal and constant. In addition, unlike seizures, there are no tongue bites, urinary incontinence, or postictal confusion in hypnic jerk. This phenomenon can therefore be distinguished from other, more serious conditions.

During an epilepsy and intensive care study, the lack of a preceding spike discharge measured on an epilepsy monitoring unit, along with the presence only at sleep onset, helped differentiate hypnic jerks from epileptic myoclonus.

== Treatment ==
There are ways to reduce hypnic jerks, including reducing consumption of stimulants such as nicotine or caffeine and avoiding physical exertion prior to sleep.

Some medications can also help to reduce or eliminate the hypnic jerks. For example, low-dose clonazepam at bedtime may make the twitches disappear over time. While antidepressant usage is a potential risk factor for hypnic jerks, a combination of clonazepam and antidepressants has been found to potentially mitigate hypnic jerks in those with depression and hypnic jerks.

In addition, some people may develop a fixation on these hypnic jerks, leading to increased anxiety about the disruptive experience. This increased anxiety and fatigue increase the likelihood of experiencing these jerks, resulting in a positive feedback loop.

== See also ==
- Exploding head syndrome – Abnormal sensory perception during sleep
- Fasciculation – Spontaneous, involuntary muscle twitch
- Hypnagogia – State of consciousness leading into sleep
- Myoclonus – Involuntary, irregular muscle twitch
- Periodic limb movement disorder – Sleep disorder
- Rapid eye movement sleep – Phase of sleep characterized by random and rapid eye movements
- Sleep paralysis – Sleeping disorder
