= PLMS =

PLMS may refer to:

- Pine Lake Middle School
- Plantation Middle School, a school.
- Periodic limb movement syndrome, periodic limb movements in sleep or periodic limb movement disorder
