= Exploding head syndrome =

Abnormal sensory perception during sleep

- Other names: Episodic cranial sensory shock, snapping of the brain, auditory sleep start
- Specialty: Sleep medicine
- Symptoms: Hearing loud noises when falling asleep or waking up
- Duration: Short
- Causes: Unknown
- Differential diagnosis: Nocturnal epilepsy, hypnic headaches, nightmare disorder, PTSD
- Treatment: Reassurance, clomipramine, calcium channel blockers
- Prognosis: Good
- Frequency: ~10% of people

Exploding head syndrome (EHS) is classified as a sleep disorder or headache disorder. It occurs when someone falls asleep or wakes up to loud auditory hallucinations. These noises may sound like explosions or thunder and do not tend to last long, but they can still be frightening and may make it harder to sleep. There is typically no pain associated with EHS, and it doesn't lead to other conditions, so it is considered harmless. While in general EHS is a rare occurrence, some people hear the loud noises multiple times a night. Other symptoms of EHS include seeing a flash of light, feeling a tingling sensation run through the body, or suddenly feeling hot.

There is currently no known cause of EHS. Lack of sleep, anxiety, stress, and medication affecting the central nervous system have been shown to trigger episodes in people with EHS. It is also possible that drinking caffeinated or alcoholic beverages at night can cause EHS. Hypnic jerks is another possibility, but the most commonly proposed cause of EHS is that the part of the brain which is responsible for the transition between awake and asleep is malfunctional. Other links between ear problems, temporal lobe seizures, nerve dysfunction, sleep position, supernatural beliefs, specific genetic changes, and EHS have been investigated, though no correlation has been established. People often go undiagnosed or misdiagnosed.

Cutting caffeine intake and screen time can sometimes help to reduce EHS episode frequency. Improving sleep hygiene like setting a sleep schedule or working on calming your body may help. Several other treatment methods have been studied. Clomipramine, calcium channel blockers and anticonvulsants were tried as a method to alleviate EHS symptoms. In some cases, these treatments did see positive results, but those results could have been due to something else. Another possibility for reducing the occurrence of EHS is treating other sleep problems before treating EHS. A non-medical treatment route could be making sure EHS patients know the condition is generally not medically concerning.

== Signs and symptoms ==
Individuals with exploding head syndrome hear or experience imagined noises as they are falling asleep or are waking up. These noises may sound like screams, roars, gunshots, fireworks, or other loud, concerning noises. People often report experiencing muscle tremors and an elevated heart rate along with hearing the noises. Individuals may have a strong, often frightened emotional reaction to the sound, with a feeling of anxiety or disorientation, but do not generally report significant pain. Around 10% of people also experience visual disturbances like perceiving visual static, lightning, or flashes of light. Some people may experience heat, strange feelings in their torso, or a feeling of electrical tingling that ascends to the head before the auditory hallucinations occur. With the heightened arousal, people may experience distress, confusion, myoclonic jerks, tachycardia, sweating, and a feeling that they have stopped breathing and need to make a conscious effort to breathe again. EHS tends to occur concurrently with mental, neurological and sleep disorders. People going through an EHS episode are likely to be in the supine position.

The pattern of the auditory hallucinations is variable. Some people report having a total of two or four attacks followed by a prolonged or total remission. Some report having attacks over the course of a few weeks or months before the attacks spontaneously disappear. Others report the attacks may even recur irregularly every few days, weeks, or months for much of a lifetime. In some cases people experience EHS multiple times a night, in others only once in a lifetime. The median EHS duration is 2 years.

== Causes ==
The cause of EHS is unknown. A number of hypotheses have been put forth with the most common being dysfunction of the reticular formation in the brainstem responsible for transition between waking and sleeping. The reticular formation helps regulate arousal, controlling the transition between wake-sleep and sleep-wake periods, which is when EHS episodes occur. It is hypothesized that in EHS, this process is disrupted, so instead of brain activity slowing gradually, there is a burst of neuronal activity in sensory pathways, which is then perceived as a loud sound.

Other theories into causes of EHS include:

- Minor seizures affecting the temporal lobe
- Ear dysfunctions, including sudden shifts in middle ear components or the Eustachian tube, or a rupture of the membranous labyrinth or labyrinthine fistula
- Stress and anxiety
- Variable and broken sleep, associated with a decline in delta sleep
- Antidepressant discontinuation syndrome
- Temporary calcium channel dysfunction
- PTSD
- Insomnia and fatigue
- GABAergic signaling problems

== Diagnosis ==
There is no official list of requirements to be diagnosed with EHS, and the diagnosis of EHS is mostly based off what the patient says they experience. The general guideline though is that the person experiences sudden, quick loud noises that can't be explained through their environment or other medical condition at least twice while not fully awake. The noises might occur simultaneously with a feeling of anxiety or fear, and the event doesn't lead to other neurological disorders. The majority of EHS occurrences take place during the waking-up phase.

Some tests like sleep studies, MRIs and EEGs might be taken to rule out the other potential, more serious, diagnoses such as sleep apnea.

Exploding head syndrome is classified under other parasomnias by the 2014 International Classification of Sleep Disorders (ICSD, 3rd.Ed.). According to ICD-10 and DSM-5 EHS is classified as either "other specified sleep-wake disorder" (codes:780.59 or G47.8) or "unspecified sleep-wake disorder" (codes: 780.59 or G47.9).

== Treatment ==
As of 2025, no clinical trials have been conducted to determine what treatments are safe and effective. A few case reports had been published describing treatment of small numbers of people (two to twelve per report) with clobazam, clomipramine, flunarizine, nifedipine, topiramate, carbamazepine, and single-pulse transcranial magnetic stimulation. Studies suggest that reassurance about the benign nature of EHS is sufficient. Topiramate seems to be the most likely medical treatment for EHS at the moment, though more research is needed to determine if it is effective and safe. Topiramate might stabilize calcium channels, leading to less neuronal hyperexcitability, leading to quieter sounds during EHS events. Avoiding the supine position when sleeping may help to reduce EHS occurrence, as well as setting a sleep schedule. Working on calming the body may also help.

== Epidemiology ==
There have not been sufficient studies to make conclusive statements about how common EHS is or who is most often affected by EHS. Only about 11% of people with EHS actually report their condition to their doctor. Some studies have estimated that EHS occurs in about 10% of people with one study reporting 52.7%, but that study used self reported data. Adults seem more likely than children to have EHS and women may be more likely than men to experience EHS. The median age of EHS patients is in the 50s. One study found that 14% of a sample of undergrads reported at least one episode over the course of their lives, with higher rates in those who also have sleep paralysis. EHS seems to occasionally occur in people with migraines, epilepsy, dementia, brain stem damage, and other sleep problems. In a study on a Japanese working population, people with anxiety, depression, fatigue or insomnia were more likely to report experiencing EHS than people without those conditions.

== History ==
Case reports of EHS have been published since at least 1876. In 1876, Silas Weir Mitchell described EHS as "sensory discharges" in a patient, and hypothesized smoking as a potential cause. However, it has been suggested that the earliest written account of EHS was described in the biography of the French philosopher René Descartes in 1691. The phrase "snapping of the brain" was coined in 1920 by the British physician and psychiatrist Robert Armstrong-Jones. A detailed description of the syndrome and the name "exploding head syndrome" was given by British neurologist John M. S. Pearce in 1989. More recently, Peter Goadsby and Brian Sharpless proposed renaming EHS "episodic cranial sensory shock" as it describes the symptoms more accurately.

== See also ==
- Hypnic jerk – Involuntary twitching while falling asleep
- Myoclonus – Involuntary, irregular muscle twitch
- Periodic limb movement disorder – Sleep disorder
- Sleep paralysis – Sleeping disorder
