= BTBD9 =

Protein-coding gene in the species Homo sapiens

Identifiers
- Aliases: BTBD9, dJ322I12.1, BTB domain containing 9
- External IDs: OMIM: 611237; MGI: 1916625; GeneCards: BTBD9

Gene location (Human)
Chr.	Chromosome 6 (human)
Band	6p21.2	Start	38,168,451 bp
Band	6p21.2	End	38,640,148 bp

Gene location (Mouse)
Chr.	Chromosome 17 (mouse)
Band	17|17 A3.3	Start	30,434,498 bp
Band	17|17 A3.3	End	30,795,462 bp
RNA expression pattern
Bgee	Human / Mouse (ortholog); Top expressed in: endothelial cell; mucosa of paranasal sinus; bone marrow cell; sural nerve; tibialis anterior muscle; Achilles tendon; middle temporal gyrus; lower lobe of lung; prefrontal cortex; epithelium of nasopharynx / Top expressed in: interventricular septum; dentate gyrus of hippocampal formation granule cell; otolith organ; utricle; spermatid; neural layer of retina; neural tube; hippocampus proper; visual cortex; primary visual cortex; More reference expression data
BioGPS	n/a
Gene ontology
Molecular function	ubiquitin protein ligase binding
Cellular component	cytoplasm; SCF ubiquitin ligase complex
Biological process	long-term memory; serotonin metabolic process; circadian sleep/wake cycle, non-REM sleep; sensory perception of temperature stimulus; multicellular organismal iron ion homeostasis; regulation of synaptic vesicle endocytosis; proteasome-mediated ubiquitin-dependent protein catabolic process; circadian behavior; modulation of chemical synaptic transmission; regulation of proteolysis; adult locomotory behavior
Sources:Amigo / QuickGO
Orthologs
Databases	NCBI: entry; OMA: entry
Species	Human	Mouse
Entrez	114781	224671
Ensembl	ENSG00000183826	ENSMUSG00000062202
UniProt	Q96Q07	Q8C726
RefSeq (mRNA)	NM_001099272; NM_001172418; NM_052893; NM_152733	NM_027060; NM_172618
RefSeq (protein)	NP_001092742; NP_001165889; NP_443125; NP_689946	NP_081336; NP_766206
Location (UCSC)	Chr 6: 38.17 – 38.64 Mb	Chr 17: 30.43 – 30.8 Mb
PubMed search
- Wikidata
View/Edit Human	View/Edit Mouse

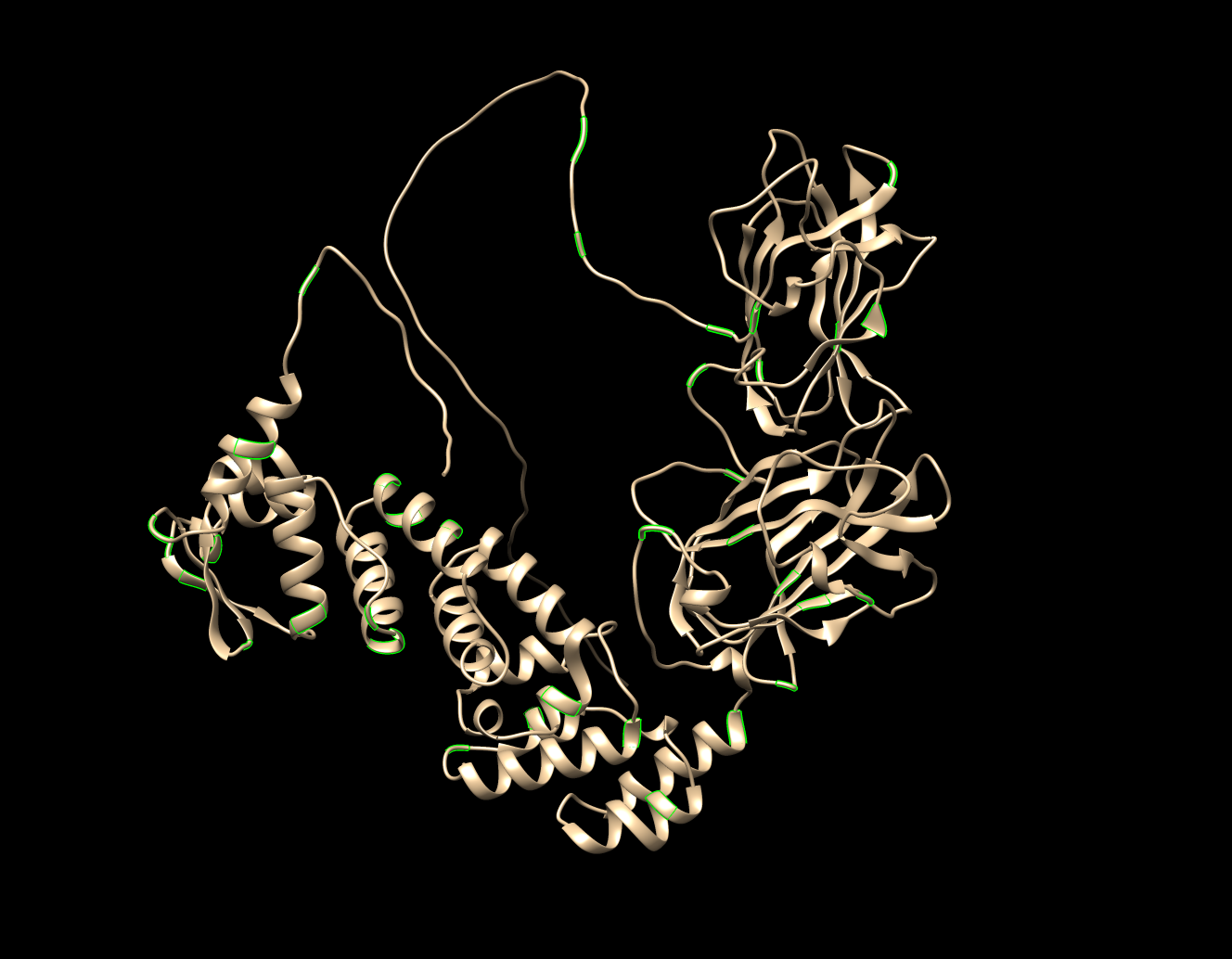
Chimera rendering of the BTBD9 gene. The green highlighted areas are the G nucleotides which indicate the areas which may be effected with disorders such as restless leg syndrome.

BTB domain containing 9 is a protein that in humans is encoded by the BTBD9 gene.

BTBD9 is in a subgroup of BTB(POZ) proteins, which contribute to the forming of limbs and determination of cell fate in developing Drosophila melanogaster. BTB(POZ) proteins also play a role in cellular functions such as: cytoskeleton regulation, transcription regulation, the gating and assembly of ion channels, and ubiquitination of proteins. BTBD9 is highly expressed throughout the brain and shows variable levels of expression in most other body tissues.

The gene is located on the short arm of chromosome 6 and the domain contains eight exons and seven introns. The chromosome 6 locational domain that codes for BTB(POZ) proteins is understood to contain genes encoding protein-protein interactions. BTBD9 is a protein located in cellular cytosol and also expressed within Human embryonic kidney cell lineages. There is also evidence suggesting that BTBD9 is highly expressed within the human nervous system from comparison analysis to Drosophila and human cell studies.

== Animal models ==
There are extensive homologs to BTBD9 which allow for the use of animal models in deciphering its functions and interactions. The BTBD9 homolog Btbd9 is extensively expressed in the central nervous system of adult mice including the thalamus, sub-thalamic nuclei, cerebral cortex, cerebellum, hippocampus, and caudate nucleus. The Drosophila homolog dBTBD9, was shown to regulate dopamine levels in the Drosophila brain and iron regulation in human cell-lines.

== Synaptic plasticity ==
A recent study using Btbd9 knockout mice argued that BTBD9 is involved in synaptic plasticity, learning and memory, and protein alterations associated with vesicle recycling and endocytosis.

== Clinical relevance ==
There is some evidence that BTBD9 may be associated with Restless legs syndrome. However, there is not a known mutation of the BTBD9 gene that is responsible for the onset of the RLS. Mutations to BTBD9 are positively correlated with characteristic symptoms of Restless leg syndrome such as decreased dopamine levels, increased movement, and disrupted sleep patterns. The overrepresentation of single nucleotide polymorphisms expressed in BTBD9 may be associated with Restless legs syndrome and nighttime leg movements. Single nucleotide polymorphisms in BTBD9 that have been linked to Restless leg syndrome are also correlated with Tourette's Syndrome that doesn't present with Obsessive Compulsive Disorder. One scientific review regarding Restless Legs Syndrome expressed that Restless Legs Syndrome is a complex syndrome that has many risk factor indicators including the presence of the BTBD9 gene. Drosophila CG18126 gene loss was found to be correlated to sleep lost behavior within fruit fly experiments. The BTBD9 gene through the use of iron regulatory protein-2 in human cell line is found to be associated with the regulation of iron levels in human cells. One scientific review discussed how the iron level association found in human cell lines was also present in animal phenotypes. These model organisms could have normal iron levels present throughout the body even when the dopamine neural pathways had below normal iron levels within the brain due to the BTBD9 presence. One study was able to look at a single nucleotide polymorphism in BTBD9. This mutation can be contributed to these various health issues. The BTBD9 gene has also been linked to blood anemia in a study. The study linked a genetic marker in the BTBD9 gene with anemia in blood donors. It was found that higher ferritin levels could be connected to a variant in the allele (G) in the BTBD9 gene. The study was only conducted with Australian blood donors. The high ferritin levels indicated a contribution to the variant allel (G) while decreased ferritin levels indicate the BTBD9 gene is being over expressed.
