= Dorsal propriospinal tract =

The dorsal propriospinal tract is a collection of nerve fibers, ascending, descending, crossed and uncrossed, that interconnect various levels of the spinal cord. It is a component of the white posterior column. Myelinated fibers are located adjacent to the spinal central gray. Shorter fibers are closer to, longer fibers further from the gray. Some fibers are unmyelinated and scattered through the posterior column. The tract is one of three propriospinal tracts in which most pathways intrinsic to the spinal cord are located. The others are the ventral propriospinal tract and the lateral propriospinal tract.
