= Ventral propriospinal tract =

The ventral propriospinal tract is a collection of nerve fibers, ascending, descending, crossed and uncrossed, that interconnect various levels of the spinal cord. It is a component of the white anterior columns. The fibers are largely myelinated and run close to the spinal central gray for the length of the cord. Shorter fibers are closer to, longer fibers further from the gray. Other prominent components of the anterior columns are the medial longitudinal fasciculus of the spinal cord, the anterior spinothalamic tract of the spinal cord and the lateral vestibulospinal tract of the spinal cord. The ventral propriospinal tract is one of three propriospinal tracts in which most pathways intrinsic to the spinal cord are located. The others are the dorsal propriospinal tract and the lateral propriospinal tract.
