= Herbert Silberer =

Psychoanalyst

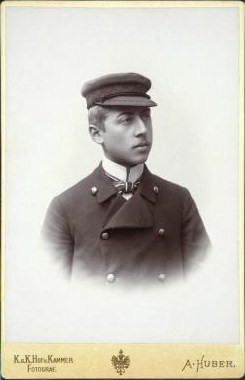
- Silberer before 1902
- Born: February 28, 1882; Vienna, Austria-Hungary
- Died: January 12, 1923 (aged 40); Vienna, Austria
- Occupation: Psychoanalyst
- Known for: Problems of Mysticism and its Symbolism (1914)

Herbert Silberer (Austrian German: [ˈzɪlbərɐ]; February 28, 1882 – January 12, 1923) was an Austrian psychoanalyst involved with the professional circle surrounding Sigmund Freud which included other pioneers of psychological study as Carl Gustav Jung, Alfred Adler and others. He had a background in athletics and sports journalism.

== Biography ==
Silberer was very interested in dreams, and in 1909 published a paper detailing his research into the hypnagogic state (the mental state in which the individual is between waking and sleeping). Silberer's contention was that the hypnagogic state is autosymbolic, meaning that the images and symbols perceived in the hypnagogic state are representative (i.e. symbolic) of the physical or mental state of the perceiver. He concluded that two "antagonistic elements" were required for autosymbolic phenomena to manifest: drowsiness and an effort to think.

In 1914, Silberer published a book on the relationship between modern psychology, mysticism and esoteric traditions (particularly Western, Christian ones such as Hermeticism, Alchemy, Rosicrucianism and Freemasonry): Probleme der Mystik und ihrer Symbolik (Problems of Mysticism and its Symbolism). Many of the insights Silberer offered, especially into the link between alchemical imagery and modern psychology, were similar to those first introduced by Carl Jung in his book The Psychology of The Unconscious in 1911 (later retitled Symbols of Transformation). Jung further developed these insights in his seminal work Psychology and Alchemy, in 1944, crediting Silberer for his research. Both Jung and Silberer had included psychic phenomena that Freud had excluded in favor of his theories of sexuality as the predominant factor and cause of psychic disturbances. Freud and his associates coldly and cruelly rejected Jung and Silberer, hindering a greater understanding of our psyche and the treatment of psychic disturbances. Rather than fully understand the causes of disturbances, most patients are treated with medication, suppressing the symptoms which can resurface with greater force. Silberer committed suicide almost 9 years later, after the split with Freud, by hanging himself on January 12, 1923. Jung described in his autobiography "Memories, Dreams and Reflections," the effect Freud's censure had and how it precipitated a major upheaval of his psyche that nearly overwhelmed him as he believed it had for his friend.

== Problems of Mysticism and its Symbolism ==
Problems of Mysticism and its Symbolism (1914) was Silberer's magnum opus. Taking as his starting point a Rosicrucian text known as the Parabola Allegory, an alchemical writing with many parallels to the Chymical Wedding of Christian Rosenkreutz, he explores the ability of Freudian analysis to interpret it. Having conducted a detailed Freudian interpretation of the allegory Silberer then compares this method to the wider symbolic methods of alchemy, hermeticism, Rosicrucianism and other mystical traditions and texts such as Kundalini Yoga, the Bhagavad Gita and the writings of English mystic Jane Leade. Silberer's vision is syncretic, the range of his reading extraordinary as he unites the esoteric traditions of the world into the concept of introversion: the descent of the individual into the soul/psyche from which immense psychic and spiritual treasures can be drawn.

The thesis of the book is that while Freudian analysis can provide certain insights it does not go far enough in interpreting the inner psychological and spiritual meanings of dreams, mental processes or creative output – a view which Jung also eventually took up, precipitating his own subsequent split with Freud. Silberer seeks to fuse Freudian ideas with mystical thought processes to create a 'Royal Art' which is, in effect, the spiritual transmutation of the soul as propounded in the different mystical traditions of the world. In a very real sense Problems of Mysticism and its Symbolism ceases at one point to be a purely scientific work of psychological study and becomes a work of mysticism in its own right (in the final chapter Silberer talks openly about 'the perfecting [of] mankind' being the aim of the Work).

== Selected publications ==
- Viertausend Kilometer im Ballon (Leipzig, 1903).
- Probleme der Mystik und ihrer Symbolik (1914). Hidden Symbolism of Alchemy and the Occult Arts, translated by Smith Ely Jelliffe (first edition: Moffat, Yard and Company, New York, 1917); Dover Publications, New York, 1971, ISBN 978-0-486-20972-2. First published in German as
- Der Traum: Einführung in die Traumpsychologie (Stuttgart, 1919).
- Der Zufall und die Koboldstreiche des Unbewussten (Bern and Leipzig, 1921).
