= Mitochondrial encephalomyopathy =

Diverse group of genetic neuromuscular disorders disrupting mitochondrial function

== Mitochondrial Encephalomyopathy ==
The mitochondria is known as the “energy factory” or the “powerhouse” of the cell. The main role of the mitochondria is to produce energy in the form of adenosine triphosphate (ATP) for the cell, using a collection of proteins that are embedded in the inner mitochondrial membrane known the electron transport chain (ETC). Mitochondrial encephalopathy is an umbrella term encompassing a variety of disorder that all result from disruptions in mitochondrial function. An overwhelming majority of genes that play a role in mitochondrial function are present within the nuclear DNA, with the remainder (13 proteins, 22 tRNAs, and 2 rRNAs) being encoded by the mitochondrial DNA. Everyone inherits the entirety of their mitochondria, and the genes present within this organelle from their biological mothers. Genetic mutations leading to mitochondrial encephalopathies can be inherited at birth or arise throughout the course of one's life through acquired or “somatic” mutations. There are over 300 known genetic defects that can result in the manifestation of these disorders. A commonality amongst all mitochondrial encephalopathies is the clinical presence of both neurological and muscular abnormalities in patients.

=== Common Subtypes of Mitochondrial Encephalomyopathy ===
==== MELAS (Mitochondrial Encephalomyopathy, Lactic Acidosis, and Stroke-like Episodes) ====
Incidence rate of 1 in 4,000 individuals. Approximately ¾ of cases present before the age of 20 years old, with only 1–6% presenting after the age of 40 years old. Stroke-like episodes are a prevalent feature in this syndrome, but do not follow typical vascular stroke patterns in terms of affected brain regions. The most commonly involved areas are the occipital, parietal, and temporal lobes. The damage may be confined to either the cortex or the underlying subcortical white matter. These episodes arise from mitochondrial energy failure, leading to brain cell swelling and nerve cell death. With repeated events over time, there is an accumulation of damage, which results in cognitive decline, including memory difficulties, impaired executive functioning, trouble maintaining attention, and problems with movement or controlling muscles. Between 40 and 90% of MELAS syndrome patients are reported to develop dementia, and epilepsy is seen in 71–96% of cases. Additional neurological symptoms reported include recurring headaches, developmental delay, learning disorders, myoclonus, ataxia, and altered mental status. Progressive sensorineural hearing loss is another prevalent feature as the mitochondria within the cochlea and neurons making up the auditory neural pathways are unable to provide adequate energy to facilitate sound transmission and perception. Mitochondrial dysfunction within peripheral nerve tissue results in symptoms including weakness of muscles, numbness, and tingling. Common cardiac manifestations in MELAS syndrome include hypertrophic or dilated cardiomyopathy, arrhythmias including atrial fibrillation and ventricular tachycardia, and hypertension as a result of impaired vasodilatation from energy deficits in smooth muscle endothelial cells. Various nephropathies, including focal segmental glomerulosclerosis and tubulointerstitial nephritis arise in MELAS patients as a result of impaired energy production in renal tubular cells, resulting in chronic kidney disease over time. The most prevalent endocrine pathology in MELAS syndrome includes diabetes mellites, predominately Type 1, present in 21–33% of patients. This occurs as a result of insulin production deficiency due to damaged pancreatic beta cells, insulin section impairments, and increased gluconeogenesis.

==== MERRF (Myoclonic Epilepsy with Ragged Red Fibers) ====
This rare disorder can involve various body systems; however, it most prevalently impacts the muscles and the nervous system. Affected individuals generally develop the onset of symptoms during childhood or adolescence, after having normal developmental milestones. However, age of onset and clinical presentation can vary widely, even amongst individuals who are related. However, in all cases, the severity of the disease continues to worsen over time. Although there is a significant overlap in the clinical presentation between MERRF and MELAS, myoclonus is a key feature present in MERRF that helps differentiate the two. Myoclonus refers to the jerking movement of muscles, that tend to be sudden and brief, typically involving the arms, legs, or the whole body. Other common clinical findings include generalized epilepsy, ataxia (poor coordination), myopathy difficulty keeping up with physical activity, dementia, ptosis, optic atrophy, peripheral neuropathy, sensorineural hearing loss, and stunted height. Additionally, less common clinical manifestations, seen in fewer than fifty percent of patients include cardiomyopathy, pigmentary retinopathy (accumulation of pigments in the retina), pyramidal signs, ophthalmoparesis, multiple lipomas. When looking at muscle cells of individuals with MERRF under a microscope with special staining, there are an abundance of ragged red fibers present. However, this finding is not unique to MERRF; it can also appear in individuals with other primary mitochondrial disorders and in unaffected individuals as they age.

==== Leigh Syndrome (Subacute Necrotizing Encephalomyelopathy) ====
This condition is seen in at least 1 in 40,000 newborns. However, there are certain regions in which this condition is significantly more prevalent. For instance, within the Saguenay Lac-Saint-Jean region of Quebec, Canada, about 1 in 2,000 newborns are affected. And 1 in 1,700 are impacted on the Faroe Islands. Leigh syndrome is a neurological condition that most commonly presents within the first year of life. These children experience a progressive decline in mental and physical abilities, usually leading to death within 2 to 3 years, due to difficulty breathing. In rare cases, symptoms may not emerge until adulthood and progress at a slower rate. The major finding in children with Leigh Syndrome is developmental regression, which refers to the loss of skills they had previously learned. Symptoms usually appear after an illness or metabolic stress, such as fasting or surgery, but sometimes they develop without a clear cause. Infants often suffer from hypotonia, appearing floppy due to a lack of muscle tone. This can be caused by both central (brain/spinal cord) or neuromuscular (muscle related) factors. Symptoms affecting the central nervous system occur because of damage to gray matter tracts, especially in the basal ganglia, thalamus, midbrain, and brainstem. Aside from developmental delay, other common symptoms of Leigh syndrome include loss of coordination, muscle stiffness, low muscle tone, seizures, feeding difficulty due to trouble swallowing, poor growth, persistent vomiting, movement disorders, and weakness. Some patients may also experience digestive problems, heart issues, muscle weakness, or nerve damage.

== Diagnosis ==
Throughout the past 10 years, there have been major advances in genetic testing, which have transformed how mitochondrial disorders are diagnosed. Next-generation sequencing technology (NGS) has replaced muscle biopsy as the new gold standard. Whole-genome sequencing (WGS) is preferred over whole-exome sequencing (WES) because it has the added benefit of being able to analyze mitochondrial DNA. Blood samples are collected, and genetic testing is performed on peripheral blood leukocytes because these cells contain both nuclear and mitochondrial DNA. However, some mitochondrial DNA mutations cannot be seen in blood samples, therefore a muscle biopsy is still needed in these cases. Additionally, certain mutations become undetectable with age, making a muscle sample necessary for diagnosis. A muscle biopsy is also recommended when there is a strong clinical suspicion for a mitochondrial disorder, but genetic sequencing results are negative.

== Management ==
Individuals with primary mitochondrial disorders can pass down their condition to their children following different patterns. Therefore, genetic counseling is a crucial component of care for these patients. As mentioned previously, mitochondrial mutations are passed down from a mother to all of her children. However, one child may inherit a greater number of mutated mitochondria than his or her sibling, which explains the possibility for symptoms and disease severity to vary among family members. There are currently several methods to help reduce the risk of passing on mitochondrial disorders. Some of these options include collecting samples of amniotic fluid during pregnancy to perform genetic tests, using a donated egg, genetically testing embryos before implantation in the uterus, and mitochondrial donation.

There are no approved treatments for patients with primary mitochondrial disorders. Management strategies include treating symptoms and performing regular procedures and laboratory testing to detect complications early.

Listed below are several recommended laboratory tests and procedure:

– Annual fasting blood glucose

– HbA1c

– Annual ECG

– Biannual echocardiogram

– Audiometry (for individuals experiencing hearing loss)

It is recommended for patients to perform aerobic exercises, with or without resistance training, to increase stamina, strength, and decrease fatigue. Additionally, frequently used therapeutics include dietary supplements, vitamins, and cofactors. Recommendations from the Mitochondrial Medicine Society include taking the reduced form of Coenzyme Q10 (ubiquinol), while alpha-lipoic acid, riboflavin, L-carnitine, and folinic acid should be used based on patient specific needs. It is also emphasized to start supplements one at a time, rather than altogether at once.
