= Propriospinal tracts =

Propriospinal tracts are three tracts, collections of nerve fibers ascending, descending, crossed and uncrossed, that interconnect various levels of the spinal cord. They are located in the white columns (funiculi) of the spinal cord where the columns meet the spinal central gray. Shorter fibers are located closer and longer fibers further from the gray. The tracts include the ventral propriospinal tract, the lateral propriospinal tract and the dorsal propriospinal tract. Some authors include the semilunar tract in this category. A few other fibers intrinsic to the cord run in the dorsolateral fasciculus of the spinal cord and the septomarginal tract.
