= Gabapentin enacarbil =

Gabapentin prodrug

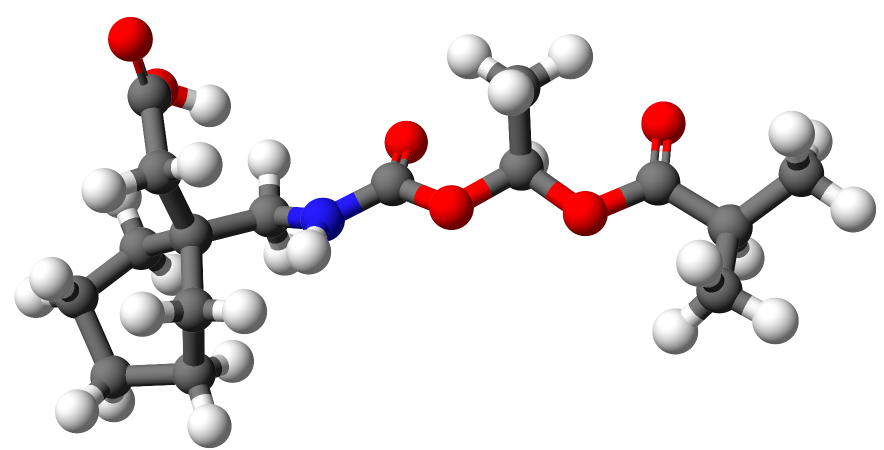

Clinical data
- Trade names: Horizant, Regnite
- Other names: XP-13512; XP13512
- AHFS/Drugs.com: Professional Drug Facts
- License data: US DailyMed: Gabapentin_enacarbil; US FDA: Horizant
- Pregnancy category: AU: B1
- Routes of administration: By mouth
- Drug class: Gabapentinoid
- ATC code: None

Legal status
- Legal status: US: ℞-only

Pharmacokinetic data
- Excretion: Kidney

Identifiers
- IUPAC name: (1-{[({(1RS)-1-[isobutyryloxy]ethoxy}carbonyl) amino]methyl}cyclohexyl)acetic acid
- CAS Number: 478296-72-9
- PubChem CID: 9883933
- IUPHAR/BPS: 7560
- ChemSpider: 8059607
- UNII: 75OCL1SPBQ
- ChEBI: CHEBI:68840
- CompTox Dashboard (EPA): DTXSID30870359

Chemical and physical data
- Formula: C_{16}H_{27}NO_{6}
- Molar mass: 329.393 g·mol^{−1}
- 3D model (JSmol): Interactive image
- SMILES: CC(C)C(=O)OC(C)OC(=O)NCC1(CCCCC1)CC(=O)O
- InChI: InChI=1S/C16H27NO6/c1-11(2)14(20)22-12(3)23-15(21)17-10-16(9-13(18)19)7-5-4-6-8-16/h11-12H,4-10H2,1-3H3,(H,17,21)(H,18,19); Key:TZDUHAJSIBHXDL-UHFFFAOYSA-N

Gabapentin enacarbil, sold under the brand name Horizant, among others, is an anticonvulsant and analgesic drug of the gabapentinoid class, and a prodrug to gabapentin. It was designed for increased oral bioavailability over gabapentin, and human trials showed it to produce extended release of gabapentin with almost twice the overall bioavailability, especially when taken with a fatty meal. Gabapentin enacarbil has passed human clinical trials for the treatment of restless legs syndrome, and initial results have shown it to be well tolerated and reasonably effective.

Gabapentin enacarbil was denied approval by the US Food and Drug Administration (FDA) in February 2010, citing concerns about possible increased cancer risk shown by some animal studies. Similar concerns had been raised about gabapentin itself in the past, but were felt to be outweighed by its clinical utility as an anticonvulsant, whereas the treatment of restless legs syndrome was not seen to justify the same kind of risk. On 6 April 2011, Xenoport received FDA approval for Horizant (gabapentin enacarbil) for the treatment of moderate-to-severe restless legs syndrome. On 7 June 2012, the FDA approved Horizant for the treatment of postherpetic neuralgia in adults.
