= Smith Ely Jelliffe =

American psychoanalyst (1866–1945)

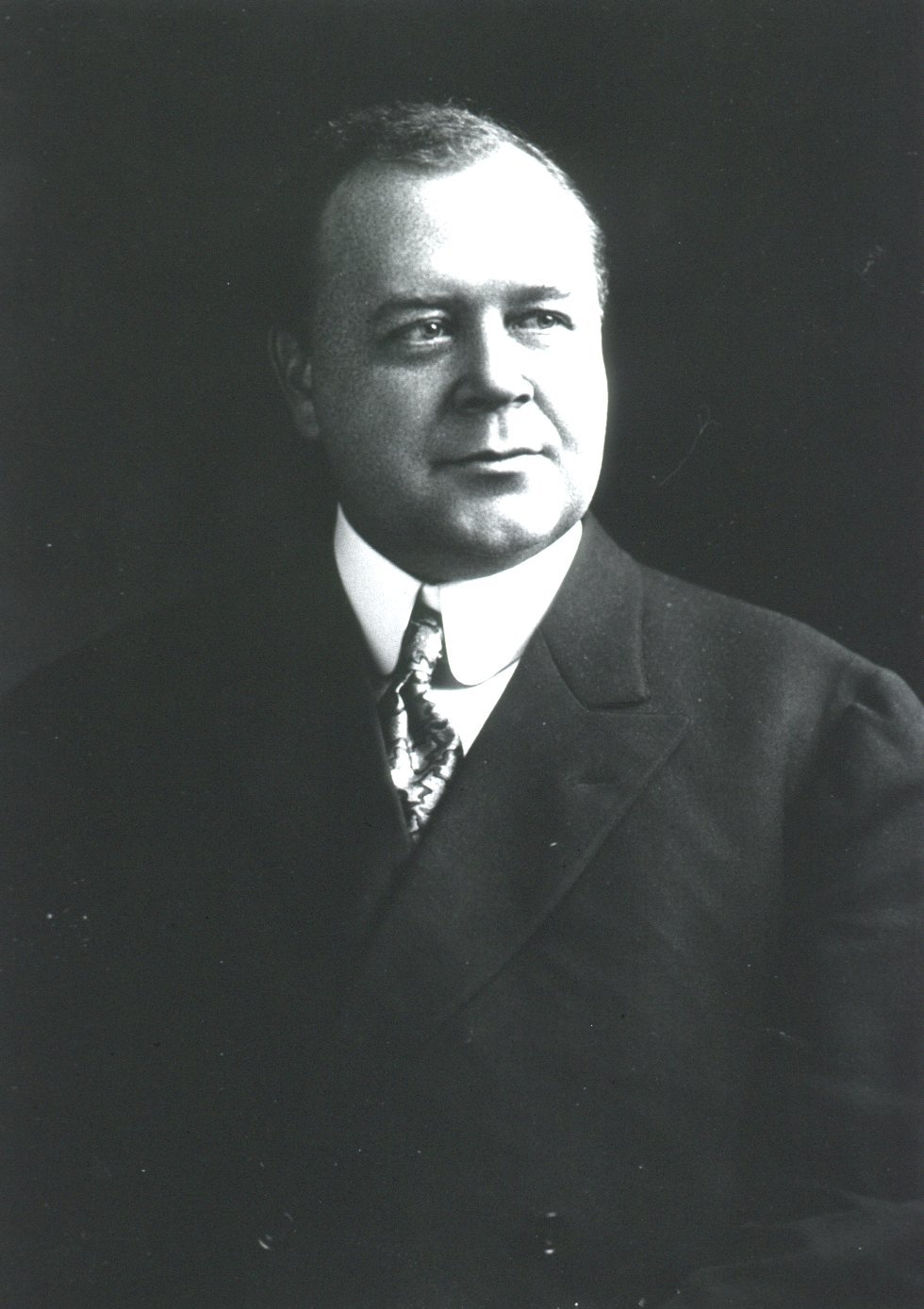
Jelliffe, c. 1920

Smith Ely Jelliffe (October 27, 1866 – September 25, 1945) was an American neurologist, psychiatrist and psychoanalyst. He lived and practiced in New York City nearly his entire life. Originally trained in botany and pharmacy, Jelliffe switched first to neurology in the mid-1890s then to psychiatry, neuropsychiatry, and ultimately to psychoanalysis.

== Biography ==
Born October 27, 1866, he graduated from Brooklyn Polytechnic Institute in 1886, and received his M.D. in 1889 from the College of Physicians and Surgeons of Columbia University. He received a Ph.D. from Columbia in 1899, for which he did a Flora of Long Island for his thesis.

Jelliffe was instructor in materia medica in Columbia University and professor of pharmacognosy in the same university. Later he was clinical professor of mental diseases at Fordham University, president of the New York Psychiatric Society, the New York Neurological Society, and the American Psychopathological Association, and editor-in-chief of the Journal of Nervous and Mental Disease. He was also a corresponding member of the French and Brazilian neurological societies. He practiced psychoanalysis therapeutically, and his patients included Mabel Dodge Luhan, whose dreams he analyzed.

Jelliffe was author of more than four hundred articles. His book, The Modern Treatment of Nervous and Mental Diseases, which he co-authored with lifelong collaborator William Alanson White, has been a classic in the field, with many reprintings. With White, Jelliffe in 1913 founded Psychoanalytic Review, the first English-language publication devoted to psychoanalysis. In it, he wrote a number of articles on psychoanalytic technique, daydreams, and transference. A quite heterodox journal (as it still is), the Psychoanalytic Review continued to publish translations of work by dissidents such as C. G. Jung and Alfred Adler long after they had seceded from orthodox Freudianism. Jelliffe is also credited with important contributions in the field of psychosomatic medicine, of which he is regarded as one of the founders. He began publishing papers about it as early as 1916. These were collected in his Sketches in Psychosomatic Medicine (1939), his only book explicitly on this subject.

One of the earliest Freudian adherents in the United States, Jelliffe (with the aid of his rarely attributed first wife, Helena Leeming Jelliffe, who died in 1916) produced after the turn-of-the-century numerous translations of European works in psychopathology, neurology, psychiatry, and psychotherapy. From about 1902, he owned and edited for the next forty years the influential Journal of Nervous and Mental Disease. In 1907 he, in his first collaboration with White, founded and edited the Nervous and Mental Disease Monograph Series, which published the earliest translations of Freud, Jung, Adler, and other European psychoanalysts, as well as monographs in psychiatry and neurology.

His and White's Diseases of the Nervous System: A Text-Book of Neurology and Psychiatry (1915, 6th edition 1933) was a standard period textbook that was also the first American textbook to devote substantial space to psychopathology and psychoanalysis (all of part three in the first edition dealt with "psychic or symbolic systems"). Jelliffe's 1918 The Technique of Psychoanalysis was the first book in any language explicitly devoted to analytic technique. Not an important theoretician in any of the fields in which he practiced, Jelliffe was significant more as a behind-the-scenes mover, especially through his translations and the serials that he owned and edited.

Jelliffe was probably the first notable, self-identified American book collector in neuroscience, psychiatry, and psychoanalysis. He amassed an enormous library of books, journals, and offprints (well over ten tons in weight), which must surely have been the largest and most important collection in private hands in North America in the early 20th century. Jelliffe's savings were wiped out by the stock market crash in 1929, so he was forced to continue working into his late seventies. In 1942, he sold the bulk of his book and journal collection to The Institute of Living in Hartford, Connecticut, though he still retained thousands of books, which Nolan D. C. Lewis inherited after Jelliffe's death. He died on September 25, 1945.

== Translations ==
- Hidden Symbolism of Alchemy and the Occult Arts, by Herbert Silberer (New York, 1917)

== See also ==
- Sigmund Freud
- Carl Jung
- Herbert Silberer
