= Arthur Scott Walters =

American academic neurologist

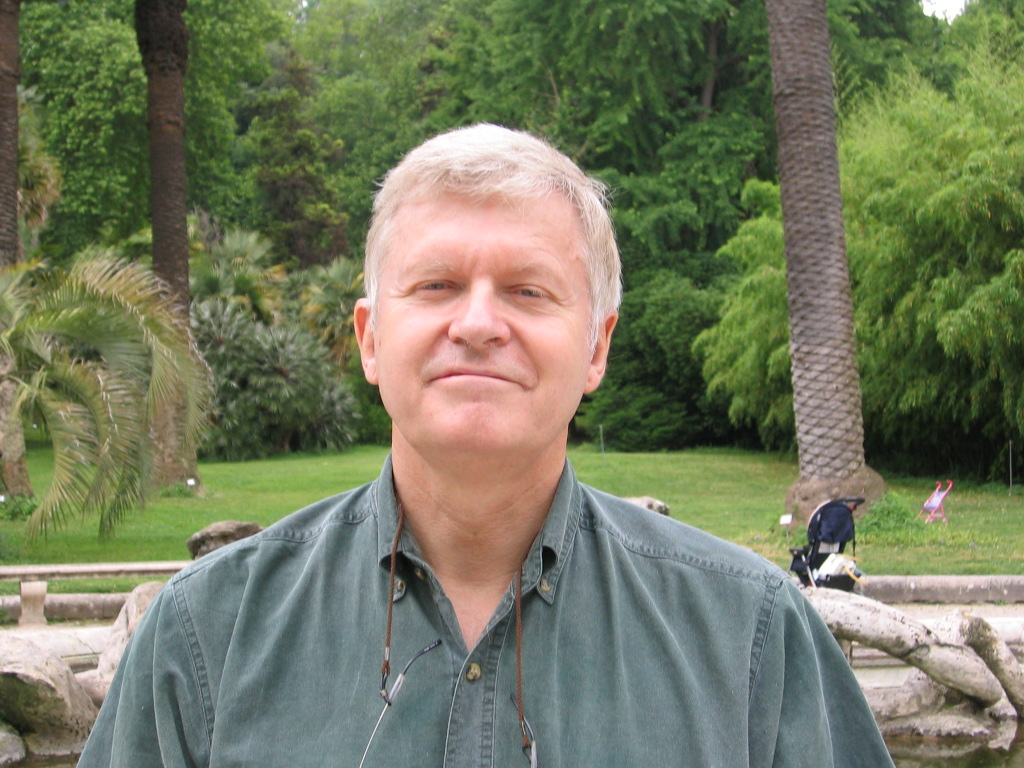
- Known for: Research on restless legs syndrome and sleep-related movement disorders
- Awards: American Academy of Neurology Sleep Science Award (2010); Seton Hall University "Researcher of the Year in Medicine" (2005); Restless Legs Syndrome Foundation's Ekbom Award (1998)
- Scientific career
- Fields: Neurology, Sleep medicine
- Workplaces: Vanderbilt University School of Medicine

Arthur Scott Walters is an American neurologist, a professor of neurology at the Vanderbilt University School of Medicine in Nashville, Tennessee, USA.

== Research ==
Walters' research interests have focused on the nexus where sleep disorders and movement disorders meet. He is co-editor of the first book on sleep-related movement disorders in 2003 and is an author on over 200 research publications.

Under his leadership as first chair of the International Restless Legs Syndrome Study Group (IRLSSG), the group established universal criteria for the diagnosis of RLS whose core features serve as those of its current definition as well. Under his leadership, the group also developed and validated an RLS severity rating scale which has served as the major outcome measure for the severity of RLS in most academic and pharmaceutical company studies of RLS. His other individual contributions with coauthors include writing the first full case reports of Pediatric RLS and exploring the relationship between RLS and ADHD as well as between RLS and Growing Pains. In addition, he has explored the relationship between RLS/PLMS and hypertension, heart disease and stroke the role of the endogenous opiate system in the pathogenesis of RLS and the role of inflammation and autoimmunity in the pathogenesis of RLS. He and co-investigators also performed some of the first circadian rhythm studies in RLS showing that the worsening at night and worsening at rest criteria for RLS were separate but interdependent phenomena.

== Professional activities ==
Walters was the first chairman of the Medical Advisory Board of the Restless Legs Syndrome Foundation, a nationwide patient support group for patients with restless legs syndrome and their families and he continues to play a role on the board. He was also first chairman of the executive committee and continuing activist in the International Restless Legs Syndrome Study Group, which is composed of over 130 physicians and scientists dedicated to research on restless legs syndrome and the allied condition periodic limb movements in sleep. He headed the American Academy of Sleep Medicine committee for the development of clinical criteria for the diagnosis of sleep related movement disorders International Classification of Sleep Disorders published in 2005 and their committee for the development of the sleep study scoring criteria for the sleep related movement disorders published in 2007. He moved to Vanderbilt University and was given a distinguished faculty medical license from the state of Tennessee in 2008.

== Awards and honors ==
In 1998, Walters was the first recipient of the Restless Legs Syndrome Foundation's Ekbom Award. In 2005, he was named "Researcher of the Year in Medicine" at Seton Hall University. In 2010, he was given the American Academy of Neurology Sleep Science Award for excellence in sleep research.

== Edited volumes - books ==
- Walters AS, ed Sleep Thief: The Restless Legs Syndrome. Orange Park, Fla. Galaxy Books, Inc., pp. 1–316, 1996
- Chokroverty, Sudhansu; Hening, Wayne A.; Walters, Arthur S. (2003). Sleep and Movement Disorders. Philadelphia: Butterworth-Heinemann. ISBN 978-0-7506-7200-9.
- Medicine, American Academy of Sleep (January 1, 2005). The International Classification of Sleep Disorders. Westchester, Ill: Amer Academy of Sleep Medicine. ISBN 978-0-9657220-2-5.
- Walters AS, Editor for the Movement Disorders Section. The AASM Manual for the Scoring of Sleep and Associated Events: Rules, Terminology and Technical Specifications. The American Academy of Sleep Medicine. Westchester, Ill, pp. 1–57, 2007.
- Walters A. Editor for the Movement Disorders Section and the Miscellaneous Section (Appendix B). The International Classification of Sleep Disorders. Diagnostic and Coding Manual. Third Edition. The American Academy of Sleep Medicine. Westchester, Ill., 2014.
- Chokroverty, Sudhansu; Allen, Richard P.; Walters, Arthur S.; Montagna, Pasquale (August 15, 2013). Sleep and Movement Disorders. Oxford: Oxford University Press. ISBN 978-0-19-979516-1.

== Selected publications ==
- Walters, Arthur; Hening, Wayne; Chokroverty, Sudhansu; Fahn, Stanley (1986). "Opioid responsiveness in patients with neuroleptic-induced akathisia". Movement Disorders. 1 (2): 119–127. doi:10.1002/mds.870010206. ISSN 0885-3185. PMID 2904116.
- Walters, A.S.; Hening, A. (1989). "Opioids a better treatment for acute than tardive akathisia: Possible role for the endogenous opiate system in neuroleptic-induced akathisia". Medical Hypotheses. 28 (1): 1–2. doi:10.1016/0306-9877(89)90145-X. PMID 2564626.
- Walters, Arthur S.; Hening, Wayne A.; Chokroverty, Sudhansu (1991). "Review and videotape recognition of idiopathic restless legs syndrome". Movement Disorders. 6 (2): 105–110. doi:10.1002/mds.870060204. ISSN 0885-3185. PMID 1676135.
- Walters, A. S.; Hening, W.; Rubinstein, M.; Chokroverty, S. (1991). "A clinical and polysomnographic comparison of neuroleptic-induced akathisia and the idiopathic restless legs syndrome". Sleep. 14 (4): 339–345. ISSN 0161-8105. PMID 1682986.
- Walters, Arthur S.; Hening, Wayne A.; Shah, Shashi K.; Chokroverty, Sudhansu (1993). "Painless legs and moving toes: A syndrome related to painful legs and moving toes?". Movement Disorders. 8 (3): 377–379. doi:10.1002/mds.870080325. ISSN 0885-3185. PMID 8341307.
- Walters, Arthur S.; Picchietti, Daniel L.; Ehrenberg, Bruce L.; Wagner, Mary L. (1994). "Restless legs syndrome in childhood and adolescence". Pediatric Neurology. 11 (3): 241–245. doi:10.1016/0887-8994(94)90110-4. PMID 7880339.
- Picchietti, Daniel L.; England, Sandra J.; Walters, Arthur S.; Willis, Kevin; Verrico, Tracy (1998). "Periodic Limb Movement Disorder and Restless Legs Syndrome in Children With Attention-deficit Hyperactivity Disorder". Journal of Child Neurology. 13 (12): 588–594. doi:10.1177/088307389801301202. ISSN 0883-0738. PMID 9881529.
- Picchietti, Daniel L.; Walters, Arthur S. (1999). "Moderate to Severe Periodic Limb Movement Disorder in Childhood and Adolescence". Sleep. 22 (3): 297–300. doi:10.1093/sleep/22.3.297. ISSN 1550-9109. PMID 10341379.
- Picchietti, D. L.; Underwood, D. J.; Farris, W. A.; Walters, A. S.; Shah, M. M.; Dahl, R. E.; Trubnick, L. J.; Bertocci, M. A.; Wagner, M.; Hening, W. A. (1999). "Further studies on periodic limb movement disorder and restless legs syndrome in children with attention-deficit hyperactivity disorder". Movement Disorders. 14 (6): 1000–1007. doi:10.1002/1531-8257(199911)14:6<1000::aid-mds1014>3.0.co;2-p. ISSN 0885-3185. PMID 10584676.
- Trenkwalder, C.; Hening, W. A.; Walters, A. S.; Campbell, S. S.; Rahman, K.; Chokroverty, S. (1999). "Circadian rhythm of periodic limb movements and sensory symptoms of restless legs syndrome". Movement Disorders. 14 (1): 102–110. doi:10.1002/1531-8257(199901)14:1<102::aid-mds1017>3.0.co;2-e. ISSN 0885-3185. PMID 9918351.
- Hening, W. A.; Walters, A. S.; Wagner, M.; Rosen, R.; Chen, V.; Kim, S.; Shah, M.; Thai, O. (November 1, 1999). "Circadian rhythm of motor restlessness and sensory symptoms in the idiopathic restless legs syndrome". Sleep. 22 (7): 901–912. doi:10.1093/sleep/22.7.901. ISSN 0161-8105. PMID 10566908.
- Walters, Arthur S. (2002). "Is there a subpopulation of children with growing pains who really have Restless Legs Syndrome? A review of the literature". Sleep Medicine. 3 (2): 93–98. doi:10.1016/s1389-9457(01)00164-2. ISSN 1389-9457. PMID 14592226.
- Siddiqui, Fouzia; Strus, Jolanta; Ming, Xue; Lee, Ihno A.; Chokroverty, Sudhansu; Walters, Arthur S. (2007). "Rise of blood pressure with periodic limb movements in sleep and wakefulness". Clinical Neurophysiology. 118 (9): 1923–1930. doi:10.1016/j.clinph.2007.05.006. ISSN 1388-2457. PMID 17588809.
- Walters, Arthur S.; Ondo, William G.; Zhu, Wen; Le, Weidong (2009). "Does the endogenous opiate system play a role in the Restless Legs Syndrome?: A pilot post-mortem study". Journal of the Neurological Sciences. 279 (1–2): 62–65. doi:10.1016/j.jns.2008.12.022. PMID 19167016.
- Walters, Arthur S.; Frauscher, Birgit; Allen, Richard; Benes, Heike; Chaudhuri, K. Ray; Garcia-Borreguero, Diego; Lee, Hochang B.; Picchietti, Daniel L.; Trenkwalder, Claudia; Martinez-Martin, Pablo; Stebbins, Glenn T.; Schrag, Anette; members of the MDS Committee on Rating Scales (December 15, 2014). "Review of Quality of Life Instruments for the Restless Legs Syndrome/Willis-Ekbom Disease (RLS/WED): Critique and Recommendations". Journal of Clinical Sleep Medicine. 10 (12): 1351–1357. doi:10.5664/jcsm.4300. ISSN 1550-9389. PMC 4237531. PMID 25348243.
- Ferri, Raffaele; Cosentino, Filomena I.I.; Moussouttas, Michael; Lanuzza, Bartolo; Aricò, Debora; Bagai, Kanika; Wang, Lily; McLaughlin, BethAnn; Walters, Arthur S. (July 1, 2016). "Silent Cerebral Small Vessel Disease in Restless Legs Syndrome". Sleep. 39 (7): 1371–1377. doi:10.5665/sleep.5966. ISSN 1550-9109. PMC 4909619. PMID 27091527.
- Walters, Arthur S. (2017). "The new WASM rules for respiratory-related leg movements lack clinical or polysomnographic validation". Sleep Medicine. 34: 253. doi:10.1016/j.sleep.2017.03.002. ISSN 1878-5506. PMID 28381347.
- Boulos, Mark I.; Murray, Brian J.; Muir, Ryan T.; Gao, Fuqiang; Szilagyi, Gregory M.; Huroy, Menal; Kiss, Alexander; Walters, Arthur S.; Black, Sandra E.; Lim, Andrew S.; Swartz, Richard H. (March 1, 2017). "Periodic Limb Movements and White Matter Hyperintensities in First-Ever Minor Stroke or High-Risk Transient Ischemic Attack". Sleep. 40 (3). doi:10.1093/sleep/zsw080. ISSN 0161-8105. PMC 5806569. PMID 28329254.
- Gao, Xiang; Ba, Djibril M.; Bagai, Kanika; Liu, Guodong; Ma, Chaoran; Walters, Arthur S. (February 16, 2021). "Treating Restless Legs Syndrome Was Associated With Low Risk of Cardiovascular Disease: A Cohort Study With 3.4 Years of Follow-Up". Journal of the American Heart Association. 10 (4) e018674. doi:10.1161/JAHA.120.018674. ISSN 2047-9980. PMC 7955352. PMID 33550813.
- Walters, Arthur S.; Paueksakon, Paisit; Adler, Charles H.; Moussouttas, Michael; Weinstock, Leonard B.; Spruyt, Karen; Bagai, Kanika (2021). "Restless Legs Syndrome Shows Increased Silent Postmortem Cerebral Microvascular Disease With Gliosis". Journal of the American Heart Association. 10 (11) e019627. doi:10.1161/JAHA.120.019627. ISSN 2047-9980. PMC 8483539. PMID 33998250.
- Walters, Arthur S. (June 13, 2023). "Periodic limb movements in sleep may predispose to attention deficit hyperactivity disorder if not the reverse". Sleep. 46 (6) zsad073. doi:10.1093/sleep/zsad073. ISSN 1550-9109. PMID 36928325.
- Walters, Arthur S (March 11, 2024). "Restless legs syndrome, neuroleptic-induced akathisia, and the iron opioid dopamine link". SLEEP. 47 (3) zsae008. doi:10.1093/sleep/zsae008. ISSN 0161-8105. PMC 10925821. PMID 38190342.
- Farhani, Nahal; Costa, Yakdehikandage S.; Rozik, Marina; Spruyt, Karen; Walters, Arthur S.; Boulos, Mark I. (November 26, 2025). "Restless legs syndrome and periodic limb movements of sleep — the relationship with stroke and other cerebrovascular disease". Nature Reviews Neurology. 22 (1): 37–53. doi:10.1038/s41582-025-01161-z. ISSN 1759-4758. PMID 41298862.
