= Lateral propriospinal tract =

Group of nerve fibers of the spinal cord

The lateral propriospinal tract is a collection of nerve fibers, ascending, descending, crossed and uncrossed, that interconnect various levels of the spinal cord. Its fibers are largely myelinated. It is a component of the white lateral columns. Most prominent in the cervical and lumbar regions, it is located close to the spinal central gray. Shorter fibers are closer to, longer fibers further from the gray The tract is one of three propriospinal tracts in which most pathways intrinsic to the spinal cord are located. The others are the ventral propriospinal tract and the dorsal propriospinal tract.
