= Hypnagogia =

State of consciousness leading into sleep

Hypnagogia is the transitional state from wakefulness to sleep, also defined as the waning state of consciousness during the onset of sleep. Its corresponding state is hypnopompia—‌sleep to wakefulness. Mental phenomena that may occur during this "threshold consciousness" include hallucinations, lucid dreaming, and sleep paralysis.

== Etymology ==
In 1848, Alfred Maury introduced the term "hypnagogic" from the Greek words ύπνος (hypnos), meaning "sleep", and αγωγός (agōgos), meaning "conductor" or "leader". Later, in 1904, Frederic Myers coined the term "hypnopompic", with its word-ending originating from the Greek word πομπός ("pompos"), meaning "sender".

== Definitions ==
The word hypnagogia is sometimes used in a restricted sense to refer to the onset of sleep, and contrasted with hypnopompia, Frederic Myers's term for waking up. However, hypnagogia is also regularly employed in a more general sense that covers both falling asleep and waking up. Indeed, it is not always possible in practice to assign a particular episode of any given phenomenon to one or the other, given that the same kinds of experience may occur in both as people drift in and out of sleep.

Other terms for hypnagogia, in one or both senses, that have been proposed include "presomnal" or "anthypnic sensations", "visions of half-sleep", "oneiragogic images" and "phantasmata", "the borderland of sleep", "praedormitium", "borderland state", "half-dream state", "pre-dream condition", "sleep onset dreams", "dreamlets", and "wakefulness-sleep transition" (WST).

Threshold consciousness (commonly called "half-asleep" or "half-awake", or "mind awake body asleep") describes the same mental state of someone who is moving towards sleep or wakefulness but has not yet completed the transition. Such transitions are usually brief but can be extended by sleep disturbance or deliberate induction, for example during meditation.

== Signs and symptoms ==
Transition to and from sleep may be attended by a wide variety of sensory experiences. These can occur in any form, individually or combined, and range from the vague and barely perceptible to vivid hallucinations.

=== Sights ===
Among the more commonly reported at about 86%, and the most thoroughly researched, sensory features of hypnagogia are phosphenes which can manifest as seemingly random speckles, lines or geometrical patterns, including form constants, or as figurative (representational) images. They may be monochromatic or richly coloured, still or moving, flat or three-dimensional (offering an impression of perspective). Imagery representing movement through tunnels of light is also reported. Individual images are typically fleeting and given to very rapid changes. They are said to differ from dreams proper in that hypnagogic imagery is usually static and lacking in narrative content, although others understand the state rather as a gradual transition from hypnagogia to fragmentary dreams, i.e., from simple Eigenlicht to whole imagined scenes. Descriptions of exceptionally vivid and elaborate hypnagogic visuals can be found in the work of Marie-Jean-Léon, Marquis d'Hervey de Saint Denys.

=== Tetris effect ===
People who have spent a long time at some repetitive activity before sleep, in particular one that is new to them, may find that it dominates their imagery as they grow drowsy, a tendency dubbed the Tetris effect. This effect has even been observed in amnesiacs who otherwise have no memory of the original activity. When the activity involves moving objects, as in the video game Tetris, the corresponding hypnagogic images tend to be perceived as moving. The Tetris effect is not confined to visual imagery but can manifest in other modalities. For example, Robert Stickgold recounts having experienced the touch of rocks while falling asleep after mountain climbing. This can also occur to people who have travelled on a small boat in rough seas or have been swimming through waves, shortly before going to bed, and they feel the waves as they drift to sleep, or people who have spent the day skiing who continue to "feel snow" under their feet. People who have spent considerable time jumping on a trampoline will find that they can feel the up-and-down motion before they go to sleep. New employees working stressful and demanding jobs often report feeling the experience of performing work-related tasks in this period before sleep.

=== Sounds ===
Hypnagogic hallucinations are often auditory or have an auditory component. Like the visuals, hypnagogic sounds vary in intensity from faint impressions to loud noises, like knocking and crashes and bangs (exploding head syndrome). People may imagine their own name called, crumpling bags, white noise, or a doorbell ringing. Snatches of imagined speech are common. While typically nonsensical and fragmented, these speech events can occasionally strike the individual as apt comments on – or summations of – their thoughts at the time. They often contain word play, neologisms and made-up names. Hypnagogic speech may manifest as the subject's own "inner voice", or as the voices of others: familiar people or strangers. More rarely, poetry or music is heard. 8-36% of hypnagogic hallucinations are auditory, making up a small number of cases.

=== Other sensations ===
Gustatory, olfactory and thermal sensations in hypnagogia have all been reported, as well as tactile sensations (including those kinds classed as paresthesia or formication). Many people with synesthesia report seeing a flash of light or some other visual image in response to a real sound. Proprioceptive and somatic effects may be noticed, with numbness and changes in perceived body size and proportions, feelings of floating or bobbing as if their bed were a boat, and out-of-body experiences. Perhaps the most common experience of this kind is the falling sensation, and associated hypnic jerk, encountered by many people, at least occasionally, while drifting off to sleep. 25–44% of hallucinations are somatic.

=== Cognitive and affective phenomena ===
Thought processes on the edge of sleep tend to differ radically from those of ordinary wakefulness. For example, something that one agreed with while in a state of hypnagogia may seem completely ridiculous while in a waking state. Hypnagogia may involve a "loosening of ego boundaries ... openness, sensitivity, internalization-subjectification of the physical and mental environment (empathy) and diffuse-absorbed attention". Hypnagogic cognition, in comparison with that of normal, alert wakefulness, is characterized by heightened suggestibility, illogic and a fluid association of ideas. Subjects are more receptive in the hypnagogic state to suggestion from an experimenter than at other times, and readily incorporate external stimuli into hypnagogic trains of thought and subsequent dreams. This receptivity has a physiological parallel; EEG readings show elevated responsiveness to sound around the onset of sleep.

Herbert Silberer described a process he called autosymbolism, whereby hypnagogic hallucinations seem to represent, without repression or censorship, whatever one is thinking at the time, turning abstract ideas into a concrete image, which may be perceived as an apt and succinct representation thereof.

The hypnagogic state can provide insight into a problem, the best-known example being August Kekulé's realization that the structure of benzene was a closed ring while half-asleep in front of a fire and seeing molecules forming into snakes, one of which formed an ourobouros. Many other artists, writers, scientists and inventors – including Beethoven, Richard Wagner, Walter Scott, Salvador Dalí, Thomas Edison, Nikola Tesla and Isaac Newton – have credited hypnagogia and related states with enhancing their creativity. A 2001 study by Harvard psychologist Deirdre Barrett found that, while problems can also be solved in full-blown dreams from later stages of sleep, hypnagogia was especially likely to solve problems which benefit from hallucinatory images being critically examined while still before the eyes.

A feature that hypnagogia shares with other stages of sleep is amnesia. But this is a selective forgetfulness, affecting the hippocampal memory system, which is responsible for episodic or autobiographical memory, rather than the neocortical memory system, responsible for semantic memory. It has been suggested that hypnagogia and REM sleep help in the consolidation of semantic memory, but the evidence for this has been disputed. In particular, suppression of REM sleep due to antidepressants and lesions to the brainstem has not been found to produce detrimental effects on cognition.

Hypnagogic phenomena may be interpreted as visions, prophecies, premonitions, apparitions and inspiration (artistic or divine), depending on the experiencers' beliefs and those of their culture.

== Physiology ==
Physiological studies have tended to concentrate on hypnagogia in the strict sense of spontaneous sleep onset experiences. Such experiences are associated especially with stage 1 of NREM sleep, but may also occur with pre-sleep alpha waves. Davis et al. found short flashes of dreamlike imagery at the onset of sleep to correlate with drop-offs in alpha EEG activity. Hori et al. regard sleep onset hypnagogia as a state distinct from both wakefulness and sleep with unique electrophysiological, behavioral and subjective characteristics, while Germaine et al. have demonstrated a resemblance between the EEG power spectra of spontaneously occurring hypnagogic images, on the one hand, and those of both REM sleep and relaxed wakefulness, on the other.

To identify more precisely the nature of the EEG state which accompanies imagery in the transition from wakefulness to sleep, Hori et al. proposed a scheme of 9 EEG stages defined by varying proportions of alpha (stages 1–3), suppressed waves of less than 20 μV (stage 4), theta ripples (stage 5), proportions of sawtooth waves (stages 6–7), and presence of spindles (stages 8–9). Germaine and Nielsen found spontaneous hypnagogic imagery to occur mainly during Hori sleep onset stages 4 (EEG flattening) and 5 (theta ripples).

The "covert-rapid-eye-movement" hypothesis proposes that hidden elements of REM sleep emerge during the wakefulness-sleep transition stage. Support for this comes from Bódicz et al., who notes a greater similarity between WST (wakefulness-sleep transition) EEG and REM sleep EEG than between the former and stage 2 sleep.

Respiratory pattern changes have also been noted in the hypnagogic state, in addition to a lowered rate of frontalis muscle activity.

=== Daydreaming and waking reveries ===
Microsleep (short episodes of immediate sleep onset) may intrude into wakefulness at any time in the wakefulness-sleep cycle, due to sleep deprivation and other conditions, resulting in impaired cognition and even amnesia.

In his book, Zen and the Brain, James H. Austin cites speculation that regular meditation develops a specialized skill of "freezing the hypnagogic process at later and later stages" of the onset of sleep, initially in the alpha wave stage and later in theta.

== History ==
Early references to hypnagogia can be found in the writings of Aristotle, Iamblichus, Cardano, Simon Forman, and Swedenborg. Romanticism brought a renewed interest in the subjective experience of the edges of sleep. In more recent centuries, many authors have referred to the state; Edgar Allan Poe, for example, wrote of the "fancies" he experienced "only when I am on the brink of sleep, with the consciousness that I am so".

In Charles Dickens's Oliver Twist there is a pair of episodes, one that portrays the title character experiencing a hypnopompic state, which precedes the following episode, which describes him in a hypnagogic state:

There is a kind of sleep that steals upon us sometimes, which, while it holds the body prisoner, does not free the mind from a sense of things about it, and enable it to ramble at its pleasure. ... It is an undoubted fact, that although our senses of touch and sight be for the time dead, yet our sleeping thoughts, and the visionary scenes that pass before us, will be influenced and materially influenced, by the mere silent presence of some external object; which may not have been near us when we closed our eyes: and of whose vicinity we have had no waking consciousness".

Serious scientific inquiry began in the 19th century with Johannes Peter Müller, Jules Baillarger, and Alfred Maury, and continued into the 20th century with Leroy.

Francis Galton in his The Visions of Sane Persons (1881), wrote:

[B]efore I thought of carefully trying, I should have emphatically declared that my field of view in the dark was essentially of a uniform black, subject to an occasional light-purple cloudiness and other small variations. Now, however, after habituating myself to examine it with the same sort of strain that one tries to decipher a sign-post in the dark, I have found out that this is by no means the case, but that a kaleidoscopic change of patterns and forms is continually going on, but they are too fugitive and elaborate for me to draw with any approach to truth.

Maria Mikhaĭlovna Manaseina wrote "that for these phenomena to attract attention a certain power of observation is required; that is why they are chiefly found in intelligent persons". Manaseina also noted that children are more likely to take interest in them: "[M]any children are accustomed to press their heads into the pillow and adopt an attitude of expectant attention towards the visions that then begin to form..." Havelock Ellis later recalled such a childhood interest in these visions:

I should myself be inclined to deny that I had ever had any such visionary faculty [for hypnagogic hallucination] if it were not that I can recall one occasion of its presence, at about the age of seven, when sleeping with a cousin of the same age; we amused ourselves by burying our heads in the pillows and watching a connected series of pictures which we were both alike able to see, each announcing any change in the picture as soon as it took place.

The advent of electroencephalography (EEG) supplemented the introspective methods of these early researchers with physiological data. The search for neural correlates for hypnagogic imagery began with Davis et al. in the 1930s, and continues with increasing sophistication. While the dominance of the behaviorist paradigm led to a decline in research, especially in the English speaking world, the later twentieth century has seen a revival, with investigations of hypnagogia and related altered states of consciousness playing an important role in the emerging multidisciplinary study of consciousness. Nevertheless, much remains to be understood about the experience and its corresponding neurology, and the topic has been somewhat neglected in comparison with sleep and dreams; hypnagogia has been described as a "well-trodden and yet unmapped territory".

Important reviews of the scientific literature have been made by Ghibellini & Meier, Leaning, Schacter, Richardson and Mavromatis.

== Research ==
Self-observation (spontaneous or systematic) was the primary tool of the early researchers. Since the late 20th century, this has been joined by questionnaire surveys and experimental studies. All three methods have their disadvantages as well as points to recommend them.

Naturally, amnesia contributes to the difficulty of studying hypnagogia, as does the typically fleeting nature of hypnagogic experiences. These problems have been tackled by experimenters in several ways, including voluntary or induced interruptions, sleep manipulation, the use of techniques to "hover on the edge of sleep" thereby extending the duration of the hypnagogic state, and training in the art of introspection to heighten the subject's powers of observation and attention.

Techniques for extending hypnagogia range from informal (e.g. the subject holds up one of their arms as they go to sleep, to be awakened when it falls), to the use of biofeedback devices to induce a "theta" state – produced naturally the most when we are dreaming – characterized by relaxation and theta EEG activity.

Another method is to induce a state said to be subjectively similar to sleep onset in a Ganzfeld setting, a form of sensory deprivation. But the assumption of identity between the two states may be unfounded. The average EEG spectrum in Ganzfeld is more similar to that of the relaxed waking state than to that of sleep onset. Wackerman et al. conclude that "the Ganzfeld imagery, although subjectively very similar to that at sleep onset, should not be labelled as 'hypnagogic'. Perhaps a broader category of 'hypnagogic experience' should be considered, covering true hypnagogic imagery as well as subjectively similar imagery produced in other states".

In the yoga tradition, the late Swami Satyananda Saraswati from the Bihar School of Yoga developed the practice of Yoga Nidra which is a technique to extend and develop the hypnagogic state of consciousness.

Filippo M. Leonardi has proposed that some visionary experiences described in mercury-using esoteric traditions may be interpreted as hypnagogic phenomena associated with disturbances of vestibular function and the sleep–wake cycle.

== See also ==
- Biphasic and polyphasic sleep – Sleep pattern with more than one period of sleep in a 24-hour period
- False awakening – Vivid and convincing dream about awakening from sleep
- Hypnic jerk – Involuntary twitching while falling asleep
- Nightmare – Unpleasant dream
- Night terror – Sleep disorder causing feelings of panic or dread
- Sleep disorder – Medical disorder of a person's sleep patterns
- Unihemispheric slow-wave sleep – Sleep in which half the brain remains alert
