= Restless legs syndrome =

- Other names: Willis–Ekbom disease (WED), Wittmaack–Ekbom syndrome
- Sleep pattern of a person with restless legs syndrome (red) compared to a healthy sleep pattern (blue)
- Specialty: Neurology, sleep medicine
- Symptoms: Unpleasant feeling in the legs that briefly improves with moving them
- Complications: Daytime sleepiness, low energy, irritability, sadness
- Usual onset: More common with older age
- Risk factors: Low iron levels, kidney failure, Parkinson's disease, diabetes mellitus, rheumatoid arthritis, multiple sclerosis, pregnancy, certain medications
- Diagnostic method: Based on symptoms after ruling out other possible causes
- Treatment: Lifestyle changes, medication
- Medication: Dopamine agonists, levodopa, gabapentinoids, opioids
- Frequency: 2.5–15% (US)

Restless legs syndrome (RLS), also known as Willis–Ekbom disease (WED), is a neurological disorder, usually chronic, that causes an overwhelming urge to move one's legs. There is often an unpleasant feeling in the legs that improves temporarily by moving them. This feeling is often described as aching, tingling, or crawling in nature. Occasionally, arms may also be affected. The feelings generally happen when at rest and therefore can make it hard to sleep. Sleep disruption may leave people with RLS sleepy during the day, with low energy, and irritable or depressed. Additionally, many have limb twitching during sleep, a condition known as periodic limb movement disorder (PLMD). RLS is not the same as habitual foot-tapping or leg-rocking.

== Signs and symptoms ==
RLS sensations range from pain or aching in the muscles to "an itch you can't scratch", a "buzzing sensation", an unpleasant "tickle that won't stop", a "crawling" feeling, or limbs jerking while awake. The sensations typically begin or intensify during quiet wakefulness, such as when relaxing, reading, studying, or trying to sleep.

The sensations and the need to move may return immediately after ceasing movement or at a later time. RLS may start at any age, including childhood, and is a progressive disease for some, while the symptoms may remit in others. In a survey among members of the Restless Legs Syndrome Foundation, it was found that up to 45% of patients had their first symptoms before the age of 20 years.

- "An urge to move, usually due to uncomfortable sensations that occur primarily in the legs, but occasionally in the arms or elsewhere." The sensations are unusual and unlike other common sensations. Those with RLS have difficulty describing them, using words or phrases such as uncomfortable, painful, 'antsy', electrical, creeping, itching, pins and needles, pulling, crawling, buzzing, and numbness. It is sometimes described as similar to a limb 'falling asleep' or an exaggerated sense of positional awareness of the affected area. The sensation and the urge can occur in any body part; the most cited location is the legs, followed by the arms. Some people have little or no sensation but still have a strong urge to move.
- "Motor restlessness, expressed as activity, which relieves the urge to move." Movement usually brings immediate relief, although temporary and partial. Walking is most common; however, stretching, yoga, biking, or other physical activity may relieve the symptoms. Continuous, fast up-and-down movements of the leg, and/or rapidly moving the legs toward and away from each other, may keep sensations at bay without walking. Specific movements may be unique to each person.
- "Worsening of symptoms by relaxation." Sitting or lying down (reading, plane ride, watching TV) can trigger the sensations and urge to move. Severity depends on the severity of the person's RLS, the degree of restfulness, the duration of the inactivity, etc.
- "Variability throughout the day-night cycle, with symptoms worse in the evening and early in the night." Some experience RLS only at bedtime, while others experience it throughout the day and night. Most people experience the worst symptoms in the evening and the least in the morning.
- "Restless legs feel similar to the urge to yawn, situated in the legs or arms." These symptoms of RLS can make sleeping difficult for many patients and a 2005 National Sleep Foundation poll shows the presence of significant daytime difficulties resulting from this condition. These problems range from being late for work to missing work or events because of drowsiness. Patients with RLS reported driving while drowsy more than patients without RLS. These daytime difficulties can translate into safety, social, and economic issues for the patient and for society.

RLS may contribute to higher rates of depression and anxiety disorders in RLS patients.

=== Primary and secondary forms ===
RLS is categorized as either primary or secondary.

- Primary RLS is considered idiopathic or with no known cause. Primary RLS usually begins slowly, before approximately 40–45 years of age, and may disappear for months or even years. It is often progressive and gets worse with age. RLS in children is often misdiagnosed as growing pains.
- Secondary RLS often has a sudden onset after age 40 and may be daily from the beginning. It is most associated with specific medical conditions or certain drugs

== Causes ==
While the cause is generally unknown, it is believed to be caused by changes in the neurotransmitter dopamine resulting in an abnormal use of iron by the brain. RLS is often due to iron deficiency (low total body iron status) and could be a sign of anemia caused by internal bleeding or bone marrow issues. Other associated conditions may include end-stage kidney disease and hemodialysis, folate deficiency, magnesium deficiency, sleep apnea, diabetes, peripheral neuropathy, Parkinson's disease, and certain autoimmune diseases, such as multiple sclerosis. RLS can worsen in pregnancy, possibly due to elevated estrogen levels. Use of alcohol, nicotine products, and caffeine may be associated with RLS. A 2014 study from the American Academy of Neurology also found that reduced leg oxygen levels were strongly associated with restless legs syndrome symptom severity in untreated patients.

=== ADHD ===
An association has been observed between attention deficit hyperactivity disorder (ADHD) and RLS or periodic limb movement disorder. Both conditions appear to have links to dysfunctions related to the neurotransmitter dopamine, and common medications for both conditions among other systems, affect dopamine levels in the brain. A 2005 study suggested that up to 44% of people with ADHD had comorbid (i.e., coexisting) RLS, and up to 26% of people with RLS had confirmed ADHD or symptoms of the condition.

=== Medications ===
Certain medications may cause or worsen RLS, or cause it secondarily, including the following:

- certain antiemetics (antidopaminergic ones)
- certain antihistamines (especially the sedating, first generation H_{1} antihistamines, such as diphenhydramine and doxylamine, often in over-the-counter cold medications)
- many antidepressants (both older TCAs and newer SSRIs. An alternative that does not seem to worsen RLS is bupropion.)
- antipsychotics.
- a rebound effect of sedative-hypnotic drugs such as a benzodiazepine withdrawal syndrome from discontinuing benzodiazepine tranquilizers or sleeping pills
- alcohol withdrawal can also cause restless legs syndrome and other movement disorders such as akathisia and parkinsonism, usually associated with antipsychotics
- opioid withdrawal is associated with causing and worsening RLS

Both primary and secondary RLS can be worsened by surgery of any kind; however, back surgery or injury can be associated with causing RLS.

The cause vs. effect of certain conditions and behaviors observed in some patients (ex. excess weight, lack of exercise, depression, or other mental illnesses) is not well established. Loss of sleep due to RLS could cause the condition, or medication used to treat a condition could cause RLS.

=== Genetics ===
More than 60% of cases of RLS are familial and are inherited in an autosomal dominant fashion with variable penetrance.

Research and brain autopsies have implicated both the dopaminergic system and iron insufficiency in the substantia nigra. Iron is well understood to be an essential cofactor for the formation of L-DOPA, the precursor of dopamine.

Six genetic loci identified by linkage are listed below. Other than the first one, all linkage loci were identified using an autosomal-dominant inheritance model.

1. The first genetic locus was discovered in one large French Canadian family and maps to chromosome 12q. This locus was discovered using an autosomal recessive inheritance model. Evidence for this locus was also found using a transmission disequilibrium test (TDT) in 12 Bavarian families.
2. The second RLS locus maps to chromosome 14q and was discovered in one Italian family. Evidence for this locus was found in one French Canadian family. Also, an association study in a large sample 159 trios of European descent showed some evidence for this locus.
3. This locus maps to chromosome 9p and was discovered in two unrelated American families. Evidence for this locus was also found by the TDT in a large Bavarian family, in which significant linkage to this locus was found.
4. This locus maps to chromosome 20p and was discovered in a large French Canadian family with RLS.
5. This locus maps to chromosome 2p and was found in three related families from population isolated in South Tyrol.
6. The sixth locus is located on chromosome 16p12.1 and was discovered by Levchenko et al. in 2008.

Three genes, MEIS1, BTBD9 and MAP2K5, were found to be associated to RLS. Their role in RLS pathogenesis is still unclear. More recently, a fourth gene, PTPRD was found to be associated with RLS.There is also some evidence that periodic limb movements in sleep (PLMS) are associated with BTBD9 on chromosome 6p21.2, MEIS1, MAP2K5/SKOR1, and PTPRD. The presence of a positive family history suggests that there may be a genetic involvement in the etiology of RLS.

== Mechanism ==
Although it is only partly understood, pathophysiology of restless legs syndrome may involve dopamine and iron system anomalies. There is also a commonly acknowledged circadian rhythm explanatory mechanism associated with it, clinically shown simply by biomarkers of circadian rhythm, such as body temperature. The interactions between impaired neuronal iron uptake and the functions of the neuromelanin-containing and dopamine-producing cells have roles in RLS development, indicating that iron deficiency might affect the brain dopaminergic transmissions in different ways.Medial thalamic nuclei may also have a role in RLS as part as the limbic system modulated by the dopaminergic system which may affect pain perception. Improvement of RLS symptoms occurs in people receiving low-dose dopamine agonists.

== Diagnosis ==
Diagnosis of RLS is generally based on a person's symptoms after ruling out other potential causes. Risk factors include low iron levels, kidney failure, Parkinson's disease, diabetes mellitus, rheumatoid arthritis, pregnancy and celiac disease. A number of medications may also trigger the disorder including antidepressants, antipsychotics, antihistamines, and calcium channel blockers.RLS may be of early onset, occurring before age 45, or late onset, occurring after age 45. Early-onset cases tend to progress more slowly and involve fewer comorbidities, while cases in older patients may progress suddenly and alongside other conditions.

There are no specific tests for RLS, but non-specific laboratory tests are used to rule out other causes, such as vitamin deficiencies. Five symptoms are used to confirm the diagnosis:

- A strong urge to move the limbs, usually associated with unpleasant or uncomfortable sensations.
- It starts or worsens during inactivity or rest.
- It improves or disappears (at least temporarily) with activity.
- It worsens in the evening or at night.
- Medical or behavioral conditions do not cause these symptoms.

The symptoms below are not essential, like the ones above, but occur commonly in RLS patients:

- Genetic component or family history with RLS
- Good response to dopaminergic therapy
- Periodic leg movements during the day or sleep
- Most strongly affected are people who are middle-aged or older
- Other sleep disturbances are experienced
- Decreased iron stores can be a risk factor and should be assessed

According to the International Classification of Sleep Disorders (ICSD-3), the main symptoms have to be associated with a sleep disturbance or impairment to support RLS diagnosis. As stated by this classification, RLS symptoms should begin or worsen when being inactive, be relieved when moving, should happen exclusively or mostly in the evening and at night, not be triggered by other medical or behavioral conditions, and should impair one's quality of life. Generally, both legs are affected, but in some cases, there is an asymmetry.

=== Differential diagnosis ===
The most common conditions that should be differentiated with RLS include leg cramps, positional discomfort, local leg injury, arthritis, leg edema, venous stasis, peripheral neuropathy, radiculopathy, habitual foot tapping/leg rocking, anxiety, myalgia, and drug-induced akathisia.

Peripheral artery disease and arthritis can also cause leg pain, but this usually gets worse with movement.

There are less common differential diagnostic conditions included myelopathy, myopathy, vascular or neurogenic claudication, hypotensive akathisia, orthostatic tremor, painful legs, and moving toes.

== Treatment ==
RLS may resolve if the underlying problem is addressed. Otherwise, treatment includes lifestyle changes and medication. Lifestyle changes that may help include stopping alcohol and tobacco use, and sleep hygiene. Medications used to treat RLS include dopamine agonists like pramipexole and gabapentinoids (α_{2}δ ligands) like gabapentin. RLS affects an estimated 2.5–15% of the American population. Females are more commonly affected than males, and RLS becomes increasingly common with age.

If RLS is not linked to an underlying cause, its frequency may be reduced by lifestyle modifications such as adopting improving sleep hygiene, regular exercise, and stopping smoking. Medications used may include dopamine agonists and gabapentinoids in those with daily restless legs syndrome. In severe or refractory cases, opioids have been used.

Treatment of RLS should not be considered until possible medical causes are ruled out. Secondary RLS may be cured if the precipitating medical conditions (such as anemia) are managed effectively.

=== Physical measures ===
Stretching the leg muscles can bring temporary relief. Walking and moving the legs, as the name "restless legs" implies, brings temporary relief. Unfortunately, the symptoms usually return immediately after the movement and walking ceases.

Counter-stimulation from massage, a hot or cold compress, or a vibratory counter-stimulation device has been found to help some people with primary RLS to improve their sleep.

=== Iron ===
There is some evidence that iron supplementation improves restlessness for people with RLS, even in those with normal iron levels.

=== Medications ===
For those whose RLS disrupts or prevents sleep or regular daily activities, medication may be useful.

Evidence supports the use of dopamine agonists including pramipexole, ropinirole, rotigotine, cabergoline, and pergolide. They reduce symptoms, improve sleep quality, and quality of life. Levodopa is also effective. However, pergolide and cabergoline are less recommended due to their association with increased risk of valvular heart disease. Ropinirole has a faster onset with shorter duration. Rotigotine is commonly used as a transdermal patch which continuously provides stable plasma drug concentrations, resulting in its particular therapeutic effect on patients with symptoms throughout the day. A 2008 meta-analysis found pramipexole to be better than ropinirole.

There are, however, issues with the use of dopamine agonists, including augmentation. This is a medical condition where the drug itself causes symptoms to increase in severity and/or occur earlier in the day. Dopamine agonists may also cause rebound when symptoms increase as the drug wears off. In many cases, the longer dopamine agonists have been used, the higher the risk of augmentation and rebound as well as the severity of the symptoms. Recent guidelines from the American Academy of Sleep Medicine no longer recommend dopamine agonists as standard treatment for RLS, citing newer research that has clarified the risk of augmentation associated with long-term dopamine agonist therapy.

Pramipexole and ropinirole, both dopamine agonists, along with aripiprazole, a dopamine modulator, have been linked to an elevated risk of problematic gambling. The excessive activation of the dopaminergic reward and reinforcement system is one potential mechanism by which dopaminergic drugs may contribute to increased gambling behavior. Patients may also exhibit other impulse-control disorders such as compulsive shopping and compulsive eating. There are some indications that stopping the dopamine agonist treatment has an impact on the resolution or at least improvement of the impulse-control disorder, even though some people can be particularly exposed to dopamine agonist withdrawal syndrome.

Gabapentinoids (α_{2}δ ligands), including gabapentin, pregabalin, and gabapentin enacarbil, are also widely used in the treatment of RLS. They are used as first-line treatments similarly to dopamine agonists. As of 2019, guidelines have started to recommend gabapentinoids over dopamine agonists as initial therapy for RLS due to higher known risks of symptom augmentation with long-term dopamine agonist therapy. Gabapentin enacarbil is approved by regulatory authorities for the treatment of RLS, whereas gabapentin and pregabalin are used off-label. Data on gabapentinoids in the treatment of RLS are more limited compared to dopamine agonists. However, based on available evidence, gabapentinoids are similarly effective to dopamine agonists in the treatment of RLS.

Both the 2021 algorithm for the treatment of RLS published by the Restless Legs Syndrome Foundation, and the 2025 American Academy of Sleep Medicine Practice Guidelines recommend the use of low-dose opioids for the treatment of refractory RLS, with the caveat that, although opioids are highly effective, "reasonable precautions should be taken in light of the opioid epidemic". Among the opioids and their suggested doses are tramadol, codeine, morphine, oxycodone, hydrocodone, methadone (all of which are schedule II, except for tramadol, which is schedule IV), and buprenorphine (a schedule III partial opioid-receptor agonist with a lower risk of causing respiratory depression or dependence, compared with the full-agonist opioids). The only data publicly available on the use of buprenorphine in the treatment of RLS are two posters presented at the 2019 and 2023 Associated Professional Sleep Society's meetings. In the first, Forbes et al presented preliminary open-label data from five men and two women, with an average age of 68 years, who had experienced RLS symptoms for a mean of 30+ years and been treated for 10+ years using a mean of nine drugs. The severity of both RLS and insomnia decreased significantly according to the IRLSSG Rating Scale scores and Insomnia Severity Index (31.1 ± 6.7 at baseline to 4 ± 8 and 19.8 ± 6.1 to 1.3 ± 1.9, respectively). In the second study, Berkowsi and colleagues presented data from a retrospective study of 55 patients who had been started on buprenorphine for the treatment of severe RLS. Mean IRLSSG severity scores decreased from 27.8 at baseline to 11.4 at 1 year, and allowed most of those patients on dopamine receptor agonists who had developed augmentation to discontinue the dopamine receptor agonists.

Benzodiazepines, such as diazepam or clonazepam, are not generally recommended, and their effectiveness is unknown or contradictory. They are, however, sometimes still used as a second-line treatment, as add-on agents. Other treatments have also been explored, such as valproate, carbamazepine, perampanel, and dipyridamole, but are either not effective or have insufficient data to support their use.

=== Placebo ===
Placebos provide a large benefit in reducing RLS symptoms. This is thought to be due to positive expectancy effects and conditioning, which activate dopamine and opioid pathways in the brain. Both dopamine agonists and opioids are used in and effective for the treatment of RLS, which is thought to be related to the effectiveness of placebos for the condition. More than half of the benefit of RLS medications such as pramipexole and gabapentin enacarbil appears to be due to the placebo component based on clinical trial data.

== Prognosis ==
RLS symptoms may gradually worsen with age, although more slowly for those with the idiopathic form of RLS than those with an associated medical condition. Current therapies can control the disorder, minimizing symptoms and increasing periods of restful sleep. In addition, some people have remissions, periods in which symptoms decrease or disappear for days, weeks, or months, although symptoms usually eventually reappear. Being diagnosed with RLS does not indicate or foreshadow another neurological disease, such as Parkinson's disease. RLS symptoms can worsen over time when dopamine-related drugs are used for therapy, an effect called augmentation which may represent symptoms occurring throughout the day and affect movements of all limbs. There is no cure for RLS.

== Epidemiology ==
RLS affects an estimated 8% (2.5–15%) of the American population. Around 3% of the population experience moderate or severe symptoms at least twice weekly. RLS is twice as common in women as in men, and Caucasians (especially of northern European descent) are more prone to RLS than people of African descent. RLS occurs in 3% of individuals from the Mediterranean or Middle Eastern regions, and in 1–5% of those from East Asia, indicating that different genetic or environmental factors, including diet, may play a role in the prevalence of this syndrome. RLS diagnosed at an older age runs a more severe course. RLS is even more common in individuals with iron deficiency, pregnancy, or end-stage kidney disease. About 22% of pregnant women develop RLS, especially during the third trimester. Poor general health is also linked.

There are several risk factors for RLS, including old age, family history, and uremia. The prevalence of RLS tends to increase with age, as well as its severity and symptom duration. People with uremia receiving renal dialysis have a prevalence from 20% to 57%, while those having kidney transplant improve compared to those treated with dialysis.RLS can occur at all ages, but usually begins in the third or fourth decade. Genome‐wide association studies have now identified 19 risk loci associated with RLS. Neurological conditions linked to RLS include Parkinson's disease, spinal cerebellar atrophy, spinal stenosis, lumbosacral radiculopathy and Charcot–Marie–Tooth disease type 2.

=== Nomenclature ===
In 2013, the Restless Legs Syndrome Foundation renamed itself the Willis–Ekbom Disease Foundation; however, it reverted to its original name in 2015 "to better support its mission".A point of confusion is that RLS and delusional parasitosis are entirely different conditions that have both been called "Ekbom syndrome", as both syndromes were described by the same person, Karl-Axel Ekbom. Today, calling WED/RLS "Ekbom syndrome" is outdated usage, as the unambiguous names (WED or RLS) are preferred for clarity.

== History ==
Sir Thomas Willis provided a medical description in 1672. Willis emphasized the sleep disruption and limb movements experienced by people with RLS.

Subsequently, other descriptions of RLS were published, including by Theodor Wittmaack (1861) (in relation to whom it is sometimes known as Wittmaack–Ekbom syndrome).

In 1945, Karl-Axel Ekbom (1907–1977) provided a detailed and comprehensive report of this condition in his doctoral thesis, restless legs: clinical study of hitherto overlooked disease. Ekbom coined the term "restless legs".

Ekbom's work was largely ignored until it was rediscovered by Arthur S. Walters and Wayne A. Hening in the 1980s. Subsequent landmark publications include the 1995 and 2003 papers, which revised and updated the diagnostic criteria.

== Controversy ==
Some doctors express the view that the incidence of restless legs syndrome is exaggerated by manufacturers of drugs used to treat it. Others believe it is an underrecognized and undertreated disorder. Further, GlaxoSmithKline (GSK) ran advertisements that, while not promoting off-license use of their drug (ropinirole) for treatment of RLS, did link to the Ekbom Support Group website. That website contained statements advocating the use of ropinirole to treat RLS. The Association of the British Pharmaceutical Industry (ABPI) ruled against GSK in this case.

== Research ==
Different measurements have been used to evaluate treatments in RLS: most of them are based on subjective rating scores, such as sleep quality and quality of life (QoL).
