= Periodic limb movement disorder =

Sleep disorder

- Specialty: Neurophysiology

Periodic limb movement disorder (PLMD) is a sleep disorder where the patient moves limbs involuntarily and periodically during sleep, and has symptoms or problems related to the movement. PLMD should not be confused with restless legs syndrome (RLS), which is characterized by a voluntary response to an urge to move legs due to discomfort. PLMD, on the other hand, is involuntary, and the patient is often unaware of these movements altogether. Periodic limb movements (PLMs) occurring during the daytime period can be found but are considered a symptom of RLS; only PLMs during sleep can suggest a diagnosis of PLMD.

Periodic limb movement disorder is characterized by recurrent episodes of frequent limb movements while sleeping. It mostly occurs in the lower body, such as the toes, ankles, knees, and hips. It can also appear in the upper extremities in some cases. These movements can lead the patient to wake up, and if so, sleep interruption can be the origin of excessive daytime sleepiness.

PLMD is characterized by increased periodic limb movements during sleep, which must coexist with a sleep disturbance or other functional impairment, in an explicit cause-effect relationship. Usually, these involuntary movements come from lower extremities (including toes, ankles, knees, and hips), although they can also be observed in upper extremities, occasionally. PLMs seem to be common features within many people, and identifying whether or not these movements are clinically relevant for a distinct diagnosis of PLMD remains a challenge for clinical and scientific fields. Moreover, diagnosis of PLMD cannot be used when narcolepsy, restless legs syndrome (RLS), REM sleep behavior disorder (RBD) or untreated obstructive sleep apnea (OSA) is already diagnosed, since abnormal movements during sleep are frequent in these disorders.

== Signs and symptoms ==
People with PLMD often have excessive daytime sleepiness (EDS), falling asleep during the day, trouble falling asleep at night, and difficulty staying asleep throughout the night. Patients also display involuntary limb movements that occur at periodic intervals, anywhere from 20 to 40 seconds apart. They often only last the first half of the night during non-REM sleep stages. Movements do not occur during REM because of muscle atonia.

PLMS can be unilateral or bilateral and not really symmetrical or simultaneous. PLMS is often a symptom of RLS but evidence for differences between those two sleep disorders was found in literature. Sleep structure differed when RLS patients had significantly more REM sleep and less stage 1 sleep than PLMD patients. Besides, PLMI was significantly higher in patients with PLMD.

== Causes ==
It is mostly unknown what causes PLMD, but in many cases the patient also has other medical problems such as Parkinson's disease or narcolepsy. Medical agents must be taken into consideration: several psychopharmacological drugs (serotonergic and tricyclic antidepressants, venlafaxine, and mirtazapine) heighten the risk of PLMD. For women, the presence of musculoskeletal disease, heart disease, obstructive sleep apnea, cataplexy, doing physical activities close to bedtime, and the presence of a mental disorder were significantly associated with having a higher risk of both PLMD and restless legs syndrome.

PLMS seems to have an origin in the spinal cord. In fact, PLMS was suggested to be associated with increased spinal reflexes. Manifestations of PLMS seem to occur mostly in disorders associated with dopaminergic dysfunctions.

== Diagnosis ==
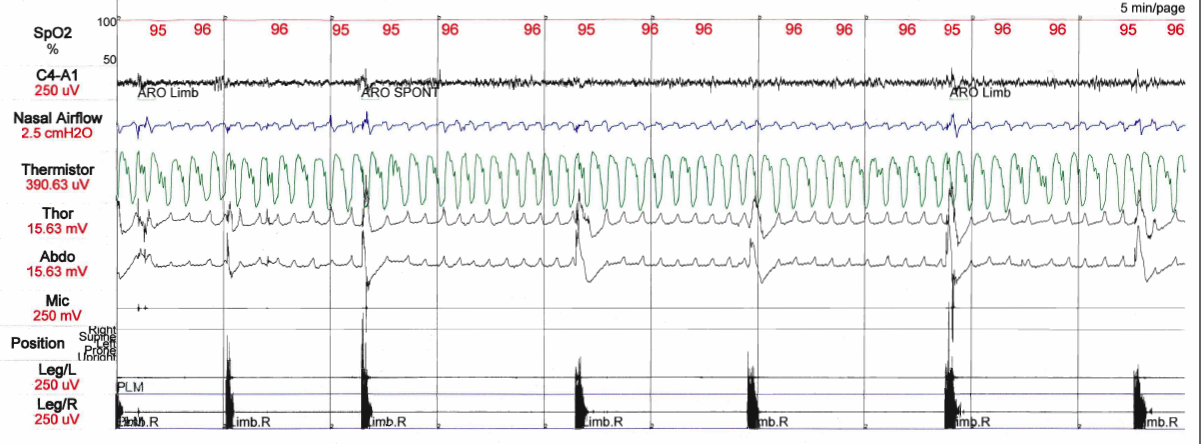
5 minute segment of a polysomnogram, demonstrating 7 PLMs with arousals

People with PLMD often do not know the cause of their excessive daytime sleepiness, and their limb movements are reported by a spouse or sleep partner. PLMD cannot be diagnosed by polysomnogram (PSG) sleep study alone; it is necessary to obtain a full medical history and take into account all available information.

Polysomnography is recognized as the assessment method that brings the most precise information on sleep quality, sleep structure, and physiological parameters during sleep (respiration, heart rate, movements). Therefore, diagnosis of PLMD can usually be established only in laboratory settings. As people usually ignore the cause of their daytime impairments, PLMS during sleep are mostly found through laboratory examination rather than clinical complaints.

Video-Polysomnography may be recommended to distinguish PLMS from other leg movements during sleep time, which may be similar to PLMS when it comes to duration and pattern. Measures from PSG allocated to the diagnosis of PLMD are essentially based on electromyography (EMG), measuring muscle activity. EMG electrodes are usually placed on the anterior tibialis muscle.

Recent studies showed that actigraphy may be combined with PSG as a screening tool for PLMD diagnosis. Actigraphs are watch-shaped devices - usually worn by the adult population on the wrist - used to record sleep and wake periods for at least a week. Recent actigraphy devices allow more precise recordings, which help evaluate if actual movements meet diagnostic criteria for PLMD. Recent studies showed that actigraph records reflect the PLMI criterion quite accurately.

Crucial for the diagnosis are the inter-movement intervals and the frequency of PLMS - each movement must happen within a 4 to 90 second interval from the previous movement. The periodic limb movement index (PLMI), which corresponds to the number of periodic limb movements per hour, must be more than 15 movements per hour in adults and 5 movements or more per hour in children. The diagnosis of PLMD requires a visible cause-and-effect relationship between PLMS and an observed sleep disturbance or daytime impairment (both disturbance and impairment have to be clinically significant).

Other relevant causes of Insomnia and Hypersomnia have to be ruled out before diagnosing PLMD (most importantly, anxiety, obstructive sleep apnea, and narcolepsy). Furthermore, symptoms can not be better explained by any other conditions.

For the differential diagnosis, it is important to differentiate PLMD from other leg movements during sleep, which are high-frequency:

- alternating leg movement activity (ALMA) is a very similar event and could be mistaken for PLMS
- Hypnagogic foot tremor (HFT) events are also very similar to PLMS and could be misdiagnosed
- Excessive fragmentary myoclonus (EFM) events are shorter than PLMS

=== Classification ===
PLMD is classified in the third edition of the International Classification of Sleep Disorders (ICSD-3), which presents the current sleep disorders nosology. ICSD-3 is divided into 7 sections, and PLMD is classified in the Sleep-Related Movement Disorders section. There are some updates from ICSD-2. The diagnosis is stricter. A simple complaint is no longer enough: a significant clinical impairment is needed. Sleep impairments need to be clearly caused by PLMS, and the symptoms also need to be explained solely by the PLMS.

== Treatment ==
PLMD can be effectively treated with dopaminergic agents (pramipexole, ropinirole, cabergoline, and rotigotine), and it has been found that patients with a low ferritin level (consistent with iron deficiency) respond well to oral iron supplements. Adverse effects of these agents have been reported and include the occurrence of restless leg syndrome triggered by the medication, as well as cortical arousals, which are a cause of disturbed sleep. Patients must stay on these medications to experience relief, because there is no known cure for this disorder. As PLMs tend to be exacerbated by medications such as tricyclic antidepressants or SSRIs, it should be taken into account while choosing appropriate treatment for comorbid conditions. Other avoidable factors worsening PLMD symptoms include excessive stress, sleep deprivation, and caffeine or alcohol consumption.

Other medications aimed at reducing or eliminating the leg jerks or the arousals can be prescribed. Non-ergot derived dopaminergic medications (e.g., pramipexole, ropinirole) are preferred. Other dopaminergic agents such as co-careldopa, co-beneldopa, pergolide, or lisuride may also be used. These medications decrease or eliminate both the leg jerks and the arousals. These medications are also successful for the treatment of restless legs syndrome.

In one study, co-careldopa was superior to dextropropoxyphene in decreasing the number of leg kicks and the number of arousals per hour of sleep. However, co-careldopa and, to a lesser extent, pergolide may shift the leg movements from nighttime to daytime. Clonazepam in doses of 1 mg has been shown to improve objective and subjective measures of sleep.

Hypothesis was presented for supplementation of magnesium use for PLMD improvement due to evidence for therapeutic effects of magnesium on normal magnesium level patients with insomnia and RLS. Evidence of magnesium on pathomechanisms of PLMD has yet to be found.

However, there is insufficient evidence related to the efficacy of pharmacological treatment in PLMD, and its use has been based on the dopaminergic medication effect on RLS. Therefore, careful clinical monitoring with any pharmacological use in PLMD is recommended.

== Epidemiology ==
PLMD is estimated to occur in approximately 4% of adults (aged 15–100), but is more common in the elderly, especially females, with up to 11% experiencing symptoms. PLMD appears to be related to restless legs syndrome (RLS) - a study of 133 people found that 80% of those with RLS also had PLMS. However, the opposite is not true: many people who have PLMS do not also have restless legs syndrome.

PLMD is an uncommon childhood disorder. Based on adult criteria and PSG analysis, studies showed the prevalence of isolated PLMD in the child population with no other comorbidity to be about 1.2 to 1.5%. There was also evidence for 5.6 to 7.7% of children with PLMI > 5/hr. Periodic limb movements during sleep are associated with a lower quality of life in children with monosymptomatic nocturnal enuresis

== See also ==
- Hypnic jerk
