= Self-other control =

Capacity to distinguish oneself from others

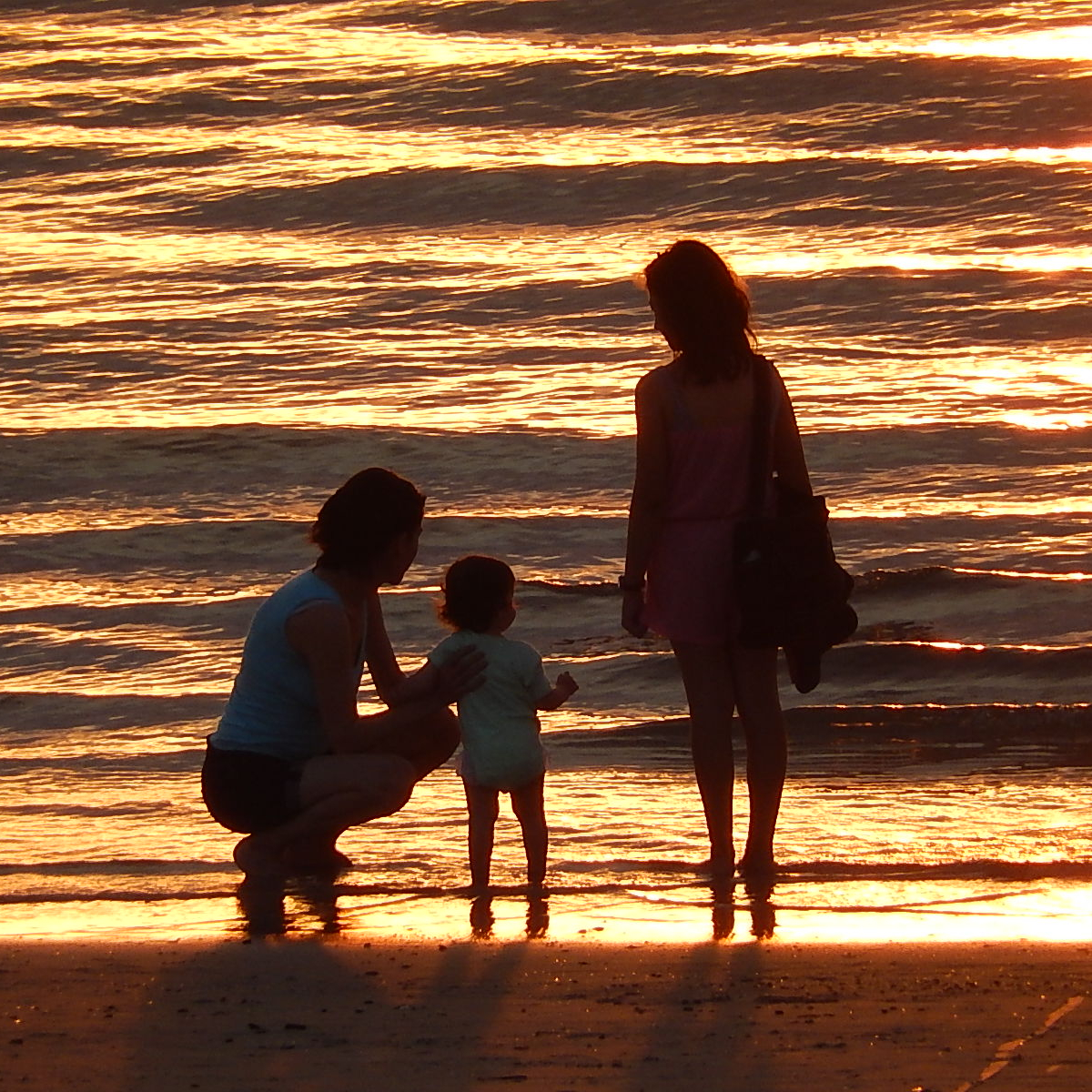
Empathy is a common form of self-other control.

In psychology, self-other control, also known as self-other distinction, denotes the capacity to discern between one's own and other individuals' physical and mental states—actions, perceptions, and emotions.^{[note 1]}

The right temporoparietal junction plays an important role in distinguishing the self and others as separate identities. Mental disorders, like schizophrenia and autism spectrum disorder, have been associated to either excesses or deficits of self-other control. In cases of deficits, symptoms such as motor imitation and emotional contagion might be present; excesses can result in personal distress, paranoia, motor tics and compulsions.

Self-other control is crucial to the process of empathy; it permits to put apart one's thought from the others. When low self-other control is present, transcranial direct-current stimulation and imitation-inhibition training have been suggested as a potential way to augment it.

== Mechanism ==
During interactions, we continually process evolving social details, such as actions, viewpoints, beliefs, and emotions. Research indicates that our brain activates similar neural patterns as it does when we experience these events ourselves. This occurs due to connections between how others and ourselves are perceived. These mirror processes can lead to possible conflicts between our self-perceptions and our perceptions of others, necessitating the need for self-control in social interactions.

=== Temporoparietal junction ===
The right temporoparietal junction (rTPJ) plays a role in several cognitive functions. It has been linked to shifting attention towards relevant stimulus, comparing internal expectations with external occurrences, and facilitating a comprehensive, multi-sensory understanding of social situations.

The rTPJ utilizes these mechanisms to represent the social context by treating both the self and others as distinct entities. This allows it to make predictions about event outcomes and agent behaviors. These predictions, along with the internal models it generates, guide our focus toward socially significant cues, especially those that deviate from our expectations. This process of gathering new information is then employed to modify our representations of self and others and to update our internal models.

In cases where the representations of the self and other mismatch, it is thought that the rTPJ and prefrontal structures support each other to reinforce the self/other action goal with the intrusion of the other/self's goal. Another theory is that self-other control is achieved by suppressing those which interfere with it. Finally, self-other control may be achieved neither by amplifying nor suppressing self- or other-related representations, but by a more accurate 'tagging' of which representations belong to the self and which to the other.

== Empathy ==
Empathy comprises self-other control and shared representation of oneself and others. The shared representation involves our ability to understand another person's emotions through our own bodily and brain functions, facilitating empathy. Self-other control becomes crucial in this process, as it enables us to differentiate one's thoughts from those of the other person. Accurate self-other control is needed either to avoid the occurrence of personal distress due to the another's negative affective state or to prevent our own affective state egocentrically biasing how we empathize with others. Self-other control is also helpful in other similar processes, such as theory of mind and perspective-taking.

== Association with mental disorders ==
Issues related to self-other control are important to the emergence of various psychiatric disorders, including autism-spectrum disorder and schizophrenia. Such problems can manifest both in cases of deficits and excesses in self-other control. Signs of low self-other control encompass motor imitation and emotional contagion. These acts of mirroring can lead to the automatic blurring of one's own identity merges with the perceived other. On the other hand, excessive self-other control can also result in difficulties, from personal distress to paranoia, and potentially motor tics and compulsions.

The leading factor contributing to the loss of self-other control is likely to be elevated emotion contagion. Consequently, an excessive alignment with others undergoing negative emotions is likely to lead to heightened personal distress. While high levels of personal distress are prevalent in psychiatric disorders, they are typically not accompanied by a corresponding increase in empathic concern. The sustained experience of personal distress can become aversive, prompting individuals to diminish their empathic concern as they become increasingly focused on resolving their own internal emotional state.

=== Autism ===
Deficits in self-other control are closely linked to conditions such as autism-spectrum disorder (ASD). Individuals with ASD often exhibit a high comorbidity with alexithymia—difficulty in comprehending, processing, or articulating emotions. This condition obstructs their capacity for a typical empathetic response to others' emotions. One proposed hypothesis is that individuals with ASD struggle to accurately attribute emotional responses to other people.

In individuals with ASD, impairments in self-other control are associated with heightened emotional contagion and increased personal distress. When individuals struggle to create accurate representations of both themselves and others as separate entities and face challenges in shifting their attention between the two, they may fail to update their internal model and regulate their own emotional responses effectively. This can potentially result in inadequate social behaviors driven by the goal of alleviating their own distress rather than empathizing with others. Furthermore, individuals with ASD have been reported to exhibit hyperimitation in tasks that assess self-other control, and they display reduced activation in the rTPJ during such tasks.

=== Schizophrenia ===
Disturbances in the sense of self, as well as, in self-other control are central to schizophrenia. Research suggests that individuals with schizophrenia have difficulty integrating and differentiating their own thoughts, emotions, and actions from those of others. This has been linked to impairments in motor prediction, sensory attenuation, and temporal binding, Such deficits contribute to characteristic to both contributing to both positive symptoms, such as thought broadcasting, auditory hallucination, delusions of control, echolalia and negative symptoms, such as social withdrawal, feelings of loneliness, emotional flattening and reduced motivation. However, these disturbances are not explicitly highlighted in modern diagnostic systems such as the Diagnostic and Statistical Manual of Mental Disorders and International Classification of Diseases.

Neuroimaging and cognitive studies suggest that the mPFC and the rTPJ are key regions involved in self-other control. Disruptions in the mPFC have been associated with deficits in self-referential processing and social cognition, while abnormalities in the rTPJ have been reported in schizophrenia, suggesting a broader role in agency attribution and social interaction. Disturbances in peripersonal space, that is, the immediate spatial boundary around the body, have also been observed in schizophrenia, where patients exhibit atypical responses to social and threatening stimuli.

== Treatment ==
Improving low self-other control levels is achievable through imitation-inhibition training, a specialized program aimed at assisting individuals in restraining their automatic imitative tendencies. Additionally, transcranial direct-current stimulation has been proposed as a potential method to augment self-other control in clinical populations.

== Notes ==
For example, when empathizing with others, one's own mental and emotional state are temporarily put aside. Conversely, representations of others are suppressed when performing actions to avoid imitation.
