= Thought broadcasting =

Delusion that others can hear one's thoughts

- Other names: Thought diffusion
- Usual onset: Early adulthood (16-30 years)
- Duration: Usually chronic among the elderly population
- Differential diagnosis: Echo de la pensée, thought withdrawal and thought insertion
- Frequency: 6% among individuals with schizophrenia in one study

Thought broadcasting is a type of delusional condition in which the affected person believes that others can hear their inner thoughts, despite a clear lack of evidence. The person may believe that either those nearby can perceive their thoughts or that they are being transmitted via mediums such as television, radio or the internet. Different people can experience thought broadcasting in different ways. Thought broadcasting is most commonly found among people who have a psychotic disorder, specifically schizophrenia.

Thought broadcasting is considered a severe delusion and it induces multiple complications, from lack of insight to social isolation. The delusion normally occurs along with other symptoms. Thought broadcasting is considered rare. In one study, for instance, it had a prevalence of 6% among individuals with schizophrenia.

Thought broadcasting is linked with problems of self-other control (the capacity to distinguish oneself from others). This type of delusion can be treated with the use of antipsychotics and psychotherapy. The delusion is part of the Schneider's first-rank symptoms of schizophrenia. The diagnosis of the condition can be made using the DSM-5 or the ICD-11.

== Definition ==
Various interpretations of thought broadcasting exist in the literature, but three primary definitions have been recognized. Under the first definition, thought broadcasting occurs when an individual hears their own thoughts spoken aloud. This definition suggests an auditory hallucination is experienced by the individual. It was first noted in Kraepelin's book, Dementia Praecox and Paraphrenia. The second definition involves an individual sensing their thoughts silently escaping from their mind, without necessarily being audible to others. This contrasts with thought withdrawal, a similar phenomenon, as thoughts passively dissipate outwards rather than being actively removed. The third and final definition posits that thought broadcasting happens when others think in union with the individual, without the need for the thoughts to be audible. It was first described by Schneider in 1959 and is considered to be the most important definition.

== Signs and symptoms ==
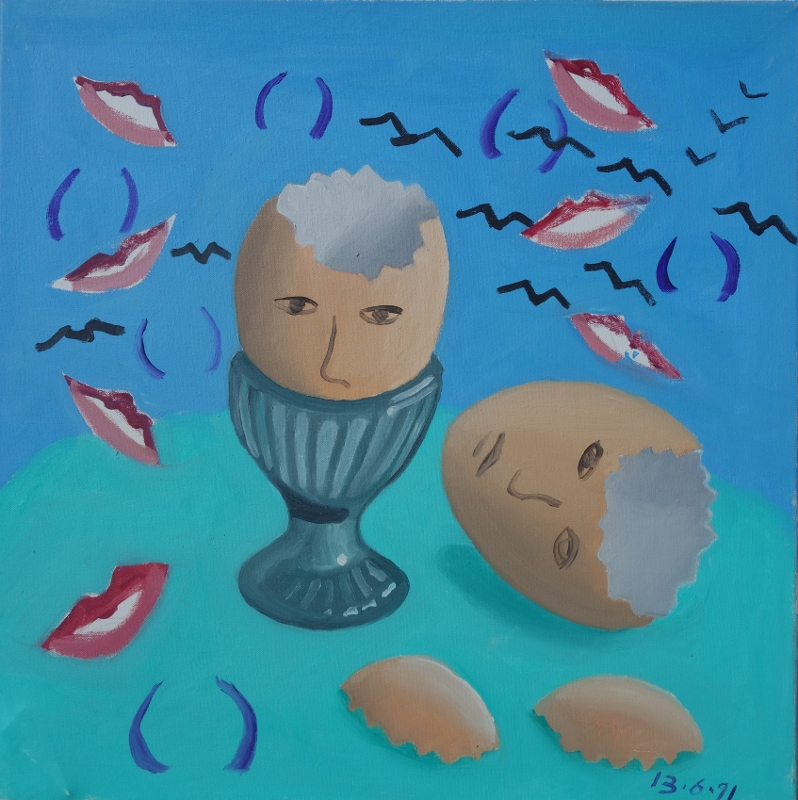
In Bryan Charnley's self portrait, he expresses his fear about individuals accessing into his thoughts through telepathy. The cracked eggs symbolizes his mind devoid of its contents, while the birds taking flight represent his thoughts.

Thought broadcasting is the persistent, distressing belief that one's thoughts are accessible by others, that continues even when evidence to the contrary is presented. This condition is frequent among individuals with schizophrenia and is considered a positive symptom; however, it can also manifest during manic episodes of bipolar disorder, psychotic depression, brief psychotic disorder and schizoaffective disorder. Thought broadcasting is rare and there are no significant differences in occurrence between sexes. This type of delusion is also regarded as one of the most severe, due to its significant effect on mental well-being. Within the population of individuals with schizophrenia, thought broadcasting has a prevalence of approximately 6%, according to one study. This type of delusion rarely occurs in isolation; it frequently coexists with other symptoms, including auditory verbal hallucinations, somatic hallucinations, delusions of control, delusion of guilt, sexual delusions, and depersonalization.

Thought broadcasting is often paired with lower functioning, quality of life, magical thinking and lack of insight and judgment. It can also contribute to symptoms of depression and anxiety. (Note: For example, if a person believes that whenever they go in public, that their thoughts are being broadcast, it may cause the person to become socially withdrawn out of fear of others' hearing embarrassing thoughts.) Thought broadcasting recurrently leads to changes in mental privacy, location, and agency. It can also blur ego boundary. It can be considered a manifestation of autonetic agnosia, that is, a deficit in the ability to identify self-generated mental events, along with thought insertion and others.

This type of delusion influences both speech production and speech perception. Over time, thought broadcasting can shape how one thinks. If someone says a word or phrase similar to what the patient may have been thinking, it could catalyze the delusion, especially if it happens fairly frequently.

=== Association with obsessive-compulsive disorder ===
There is a very high comorbidity between obsessive-compulsive disorder (OCD) and schizophrenia. This may result from obsessive-compulsive symptoms that initially present or worsen with the use of atypical antipsychotics, a common treatment modality for schizophrenia. Intrusive thoughts—involuntary and unwanted thoughts, ideas, and images—constitute a central symptom of OCD. When these intrusive thoughts are coupled with thought broadcasting, it causes a special concern that these could be apprehended by others, resulting in increased anxiety and shame, leading to social isolation—a safety behavior. The relief given by isolation then reinforces the belief that the individual needs to stay away from others.

== Causes ==
Auditory hallucinations are often depicted as malicious voices that possess knowledge about the person's private and shameful thoughts or actions, which the individual would prefer to keep hidden. In these situations, thought broadcasting arises as an inability to conceal one's own thoughts. This type of delusion is also believed to be linked with problems in self-other control, that is, when an individual adjusts the representation of oneself and others in social interactions. (Note: For example, when empathizing with others, one's own mental and emotional state are temporarily put aside. Conversely, representations of others are suppressed when performing actions to avoid imitation.) Methamphetamine abuse can induce psychosis, including thought broadcasting. One theory suggests that when the two hemispheres of the brain are not effectively integrated, the left hemisphere may fail to identify the source of feelings and thoughts originating in the right hemisphere. As a result, individuals may experience the mistaken belief that these thoughts and emotions are either being inserted into (thought insertion), removed from (thought withdrawal), or transmitted out of their own head (thought broadcasting).

== Treatment ==
Individuals with thought broadcasting have a lower acceptance of treatment. Both antipsychotic medication and psychotherapy, specially cognitive behavioral therapy, may be useful. In one case study, cognitive behavioral therapy and exposure therapy helped reduce significantly the conviction of thought broadcasting. In another case study, where an individual with schizophrenia also exhibited comorbid obsessive-compulsive symptoms, treating these symptoms helped to reduce thought broadcasting. This delusion does not significantly affect the prognosis for patients with psychosis, though is observed more often in schizophrenia with poor prognosis.

== Diagnosis and classification ==
Thought broadcasting was initially described by Emil Kraepelin in his 1913 work, Psychiatrie. In the mid-1900s, Kurt Schneider classified thought broadcasting as typical of schizophrenia, encompassing it as a first-rank symptom along with 7 others. From then, the delusion has been incorporated into the Diagnostic and Statistical Manual of Mental Disorders (DSM-5) and the International Classification of Diseases (ICD-11) diagnostic criteria. The DSM-5 outlines eleven categories of delusions, among which thought broadcasting is included. The ICD-11 characterizes it as in experiences of influence, passivity, and control, along with thought insertion and withdrawal. The DSM-5 specifies thought broadcasting as a belief that one's thoughts are transmitted and consequently perceived by others. It also classifies it as bizarre—a delusion of implausible and incomprehensible nature. In contrast, the ICD-11 provides a broader description, stating that an individual's thoughts are accessible to others, enabling them to know the content of those thoughts. Furthermore, it includes thought broadcasting as one of the core symptoms for diagnosing schizophrenia.

== See also ==
- Thought withdrawal – Delusional belief that thoughts have been taken out of one's mind
- Thought insertion – Delusional belief that thoughts have been inserted into one's mind
- Imaginary audience – Concept in developmental psychology
- Telepathy
