= Lylas Mogk =

American ophthalmologist

Lylas Good Mogk is an American ophthalmologist and author. She was the first director of the Henry Ford Center for Vision Rehabilitation and Research at Henry Ford Health in Detroit, Michigan. She is known for her work in low vision rehabilitation.

== Career ==
She earned a BA from Vassar College in 1961; an MS from Indiana University in 1962; and an MD from Wayne State University in 1981. She was the founding director of the Henry Ford Center for Vision Rehabilitation and Research in Detroit, Michigan. She also served as Chair of the Michigan Commission for the Blind, Advisory to the Michigan Bureau of Services for Blind People, and as Chair of the Michigan Network for Vision Rehabilitation.

== Work ==
Mogk works in the field of comprehensive ophthalmology, with a focus on age-related macular degeneration. In 1997 Mogk developed the first written policy for Medicare coverage for occupational therapy services for visual impairments. She is the co-author, with her daughter Marja Mogk, of the book Macular Degeneration: The Complete Guide to Saving and Maximizing Your Sight (1996), which was awarded the 1999 AER Literature Award. The book was written after Mogk's father, Chuck Good, started losing his eyesight from age-related macular degeneration. She has also shared knowledge with the public about Charles Bonnet syndrome, a condition where people with severe vision loss develop hallucinations.

== Honors and awards ==
In 2011 Mogk was awarded the Migel Medal by the American Foundation for the Blind, which was established in 1937 to recognize those whose dedication and achievements have significantly improved the lives of people with vision loss.
