= Thought withdrawal =

Delusional belief that thoughts have been taken out of one's mind

In psychiatry, thought withdrawal is the delusional belief that thoughts have been 'taken out' of the patient's mind, and the patient has no power over this. It is often associated with disturbances in self-experience, self-agency, and identity. Thought withdrawal is classified as Schneider's first-rank symptom (FRS) of schizophrenia in 1959, alongside related phenomena like thought insertion (the belief that thoughts are being implanted into one’s mind) and thought broadcasting (the belief that one’s thoughts are being transmitted to others). These symptoms are typically regarded as signs of psychosis and are central to the diagnosis of schizophrenia spectrum disorders and dissociative identity disorder.

== Diagnostic classifications ==
Thought withdrawal is included in major psychiatric diagnostic systems:

- DSM-5: explicitly mentioned as an example of a "delusion of control" under the criteria of schizophrenia.
- ICD-11: categorized under 6A20 Schizophrenia as a part of passivity phenomena -- a set of symptoms characterized by the belief that one’s thoughts, emotions, or behaviors are being directed or manipulated by an outside source.

== Theoretical and explanatory models ==
=== Phenomenological psychiatry ===
German psychiatrist Karl Jaspers classified the concept of thought withdrawal as “primary delusions” and described it as “non-understandable” – abrupt experiences that cannot be interpreted by ordinary psychological processes. Jasper described thought withdrawal as the loss of intentional mental activity and considered it to involve disruptions in agency, intentionality, and consciousness. Together, he and other phenomenologists (e.g. Kurt Schneider) linked thought withdrawal to various features:

- Hyperreflexivity (i.e. a state of heightened self-awareness that leads to excessive attention being directed toward automatic mental processes)
- Disrupted intentionality (i.e. the directedness of thought and consciousness)
- Disrupted temporal self-continuity (i.e. losing the personal feeling of coherence across time)
- Diminished perceptual integration and self-boundaries (i.e. no longer experiences thoughts as arising from within a stable self)

=== Cognitive models ===
The self-monitoring model proposed by Chris Frith argued that schizophrenia involves failure of the brain’s self-monitoring system (i.e. the mechanism responsible for monitoring and predicting self-generated mental activities). Consequently, individuals misattribute their self-generated thoughts to externally imposed mental contents, leading to thought withdrawal, thought insertion, and delusions of control. Similarly, Bentall’s attributional model suggested that individuals with delusions often present cognitive misattributions of momentary disturbances or lapses in thought flow, attributing it to external agents (i.e. thought withdrawal). This externalization aids in the protection of self-esteem but leads to false beliefs about the cause of one’s own experiences.

=== Neurobiological theories ===
Kapur’s aberrant salience hypothesis proposes that dysregulated dopamine transmission leads to exaggerated significance being assigned to neutral internal events (e.g. ordinary lapses in thoughts). When this occurs, delusions like thought withdrawal occur to make sense of “aberrantly salient experiences”.

Researchers investigating delusional experiences (i.e. delusions of being controlled, thought withdrawal, thought broadcasting, thought insertion, and mind reading) in antipsychotic-free individuals with schizophrenia conducted a factor analysis on item-level symptom ratings. Findings proposed the link between delusions and brain areas that support self-referential processing and distinctions between internal and external experience. Specifically, hypoperfusion (i.e. reduced blood flow) in the anterior cingulate cortex (ACC) and medial prefrontal cortex (MPFC) contribute to the emergence of symptoms like thought withdrawal.

López-Silva et al.’s 20-year longitudinal study of individuals with schizophrenia and other psychosis investigated the persistence and co-occurrence of thought withdrawal, insertion, and broadcasting. Findings showed that thought withdrawal consistently appeared alongside symptoms such as anxiety, auditory verbal hallucinations (AVHs), delusions of control, and depersonalization. This reflected broader disruptions in multimodal processing (i.e. the boundary between internal cognition and external perception) and a broader phenomenon called pseudo-coherent delusional realities (i.e. the mind’s attempt to impose coherence on anomalous experiences of reality).

== Clinical presentations and effects ==
Associated symptoms of thought withdrawal include:

- A diminished sense of control over one’s own mental activity
- Gaps in thinking, commonly described as externally extracted
- Feelings of being manipulated and monitored

The aforementioned experiences may arise suddenly and involuntarily, thus significantly impairing daily functioning. This could result in social withdrawal and paranoid ideation, often accompanied by fear and distress.

=== Associated diagnosis ===
- A 2020 study by Malinowski et al. discovered that 41% of individuals experiencing first-episode psychosis reported symptoms of thought withdrawal, suggesting that it is a relatively frequent feature in early psychosis.
- A 20-year longitudinal study by López-Silva et al. revealed that thought withdrawal is rarely reported without the presence of AVHs. This finding proposed a continuum model of self-disturbance.

== Criticisms and limitations ==
Traditional research synthesizes all delusions under the “positive symptoms” category of schizophrenia, obscuring meaningful distinctions. Overemphasis on symptom clusters (i.e. positive vs. negative symptoms) failed to capture the experiential overlap between symptoms, which is essential for understanding and predicting schizophrenia development. Similarly, the reductionism of cognitive and neurobiological models (e.g. Kapur’s aberrant salience hypothesis) highlighted the need to examine thought withdrawal as an independent symptom alongside psychological, cultural, and interpersonal factors to fully explain its variations in symptom content. On this basis, researchers (e.g. Jaspers and López-Silva) emphasized the need to develop symptom-specific, longitudinal frameworks to bridge major gaps in cognitive neuroscience and psychiatry (i.e. the emergence of thought withdrawal, the precise link between thought withdrawal and other symptoms / varied subjective experiences). Nonetheless, despite some models emphasizing thought withdrawal as a core symptom of schizophrenia, others question its diagnostic reliability due to its rarity in some patient groups.

== See also ==
- Auditory hallucinations
- Delusion
- Phenomenology
- Self-agency
- Schizophrenia
- Thought insertion
- Thought broadcasting
