= Musical ear syndrome =

Auditory hallucination associated with hearing loss

Musical ear syndrome (MES) is a condition seen in people who have hearing loss and subsequently develop auditory hallucinations. "MES" has also been associated with musical hallucinations, which is a complex form of auditory hallucinations where an individual may experience music or sounds that are heard without an external source. It is comparable to Charles Bonnet syndrome (visual hallucinations in visually impaired people) and some have suggested this phenomenon could be included under this diagnosis.

== Causes ==
It is hypothesized that by the "release phenomenon" MES is caused by hypersensitivity in the auditory cortex caused by sensory deprivation, secondary to their hearing loss. This "hole" in the hearing range is "plugged" by the brain fabricating a piece of information – in this case a piece of music. A similar occurrence is seen with strokes of the visual cortex where a visual field defect occurs, and the brain conjures a piece of visual data to fill the spot.

The hallucinations are usually not unpleasant but may irritate due to their persistent nature. It is common for patients to have a history of tinnitus.

Investigations such as magnetic resonance imaging or CT scanning and electroencephalograms (EEGs) may be worthwhile but will rarely show any serious pathology. It is believed that because this kind of phenomenon is usually heterogenous in causation, a wide variety of factors need to be considered, which could give a possible explanation for why MES is seen as underdiagnosed. Some of these factors may include significant trauma to the head or any side-effects from substances such as antidepressants, marijuana, alcohol, procaine, or general anesthesia.

MES may occur even when there are little to no symptoms derived from medical testing.

== Treatment ==
Given the unknown nature of MES, treatments have been largely dependent on an individual basis. Treatments can vary from being as little as self-reassurance to pharmaceutical medications.

Medications can be helpful, such as antipsychotics, benzodiazepines, or antiepileptics, but there is very limited evidence for this. Some case studies have found that switching to a prednisolone steroid after a betamethasone steroid which caused MES helped alleviate hallucinations or the use of the acetylcholinesterase inhibitor, donepezil, has also found that it successfully treated an individual's MES. However, because of the heterogeneous etiology, these methods cannot be applied as general treatment.

Other than treatment by medicinal means, individuals have also successfully alleviated musical hallucinations by cochlear implants, listening to different songs via an external source, or attempting to block them through mental effort, depending on how severe their condition is.

Hallucinations can be reduced by providing the brain with a percentage of the lost input from hearing loss, and patients can maximize their hearing capability by utilizing hearing aids. Hearing aids can make up some of the patients' hearing loss, and potentially alleviate these musical hallucinations. However, this is not effective for all patients.

It is believed that non-drug treatment options are better than drug options for the elderly population that may suffer from MES.

== Populations ==
The occurrence of MES has been suggested to be very high among the hearing impaired through acquired deafness or the ear condition known as tinnitus. Though exact causation is uncertain, it has been theorized that the "release phenomenon" is taken into effect. The "release phenomenon" says that individuals with acquired deafness may experience musical hallucinations because of the lack of stimulation, which can give room for the brain to interpret internal sounds as being external.

Sufferers typically hear music or singing and the condition is more common in women. The hallucinatory experiences differ from that commonly experienced in psychotic disorders although there may be some overlap. The most important distinction is the realization that the hallucinations are not real. Delusional beliefs associated with the hallucinations may occur, but some degree of insight should be preserved. There should not be any other psychotic symptoms present, especially hallucinations in other modalities.

Due to the high correlation with hearing loss, MES is common in the elderly due to their often depreciating hearing abilities.

== History ==
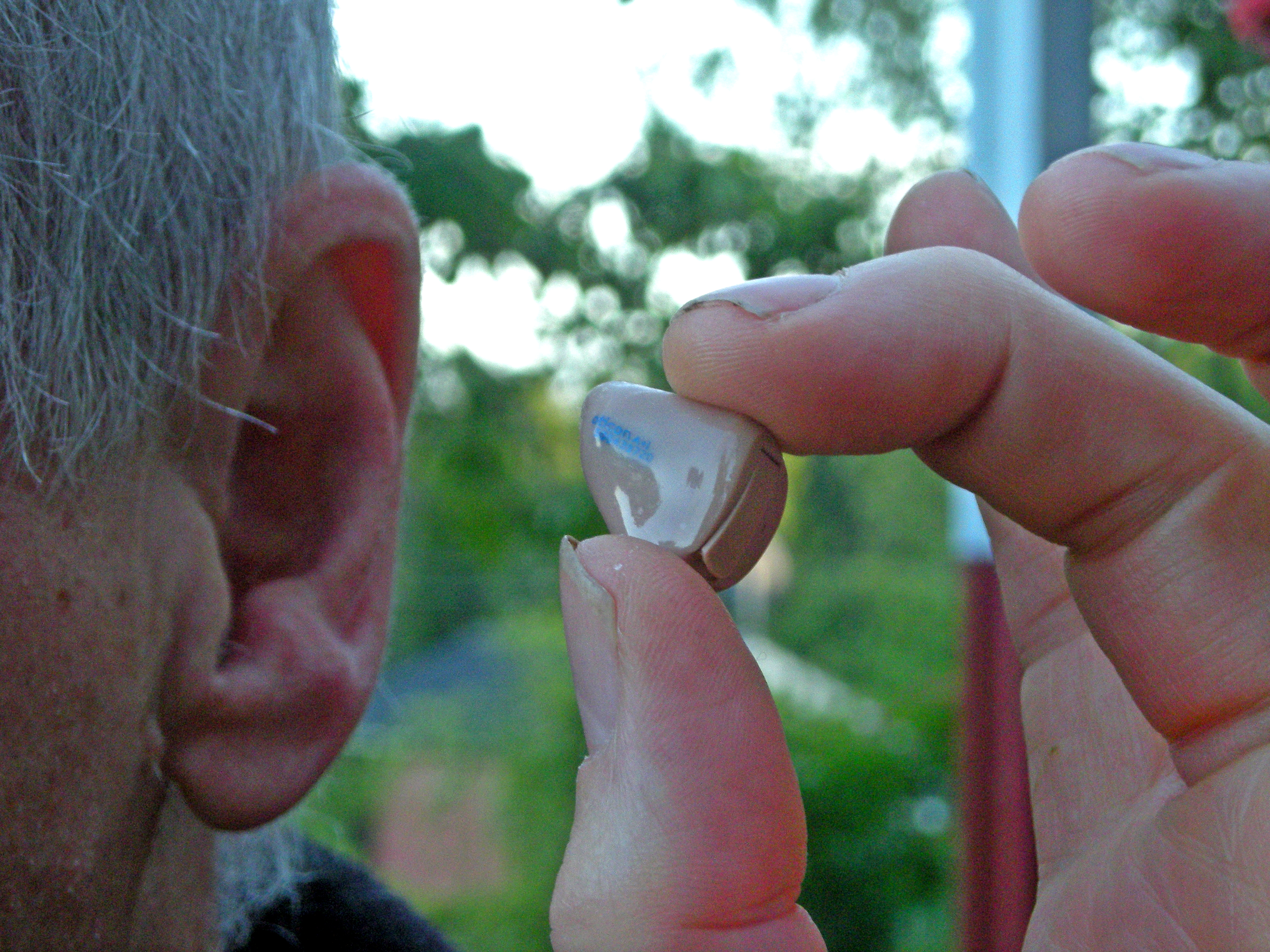
A hearing aid such as this one may be used to help alleviate MES in some patients.

Musical hallucinations and MES have only become widely recognizable in the last few decades of research, but there are indications throughout history that have described symptoms of musical hallucinations. The Romantic composer Robert Schumann was said to have heard entire symphonies in his head from which he drew as inspiration for his music, but later in his life this phenomenon had diminished to just a note that played ceaselessly within his head. An alternative explanation is that his symptoms were caused by syphilis or mercury poisoning used for its treatment. The Russian composer Dmitri Shostakovich was also recorded as experiencing music hallucinations after some shrapnel was removed from his skull.

MES is typically a harmless disease, but can be somewhat disturbing to patients, and can disrupt their quality of life. MES is not considered a mental illness, but rather a side effect of hearing loss.

== See also ==
- Sensory deprivation
- Visual release hallucinations
- Apophenia – perceiving a pattern where none exists
- Pareidolia – perceiving coherent sounds in random noises
