= Gemütlose psychopathy =

- Specialty: Psychiatry
- Risk factors: Childhood abuse
- Diagnostic method: Based on reported symptoms
- Differential diagnosis: Haltlose personality disorder, disorganized schizophrenia
- Prognosis: Poor

Gemütlose psychopathy was one of the initial seven forms of psychopathy identified by Emil Kraepelin and later psychiatrists. It was of particular interest to forensic psychiatrists and criminologists as it and haltlose personality disorder were considered the only two psychopathies that "had high levels of criminal behavior" without external influence, and thus made up the minority of psychopaths who are "virtually doomed to commit crimes" by virtue only of their own constitution.

They were described by Kurt Schneider as essentially lacking honor, pity, shame, remorse or conscience.

It is not a term in regular use today, but was used to describe what is today known as antisocial personality disorder.

== Characteristics ==
Homburger opined that there was no means of rehabilitating youth, as they were disrespectful and devoid of any moral sense – taking pleasure in images of vengeance and screaming madly.

E. H. Hughes noted that two-thirds of Huntington's disease patients had previously been diagnosed as Haltlose or Gemütlose psychopaths.

Masturbation is more prevalent in Haltlose and Gemütlose psychopaths than in other disorders. In adolescence they struggle with an overactive sex drive.

== Notable cases ==
Wolfgang Scheler, the son of philosopher Max Scheler, was sent to Schneider at his father's request in 1923 and diagnosed as both a haltlose and Gemütlose psychopath. After two decades of an unstable life that involved pimping among other crimes, he was sent to Sachsenhausen concentration camp in 1939; there are no further records of him.

In 1969, it was suggested that maternal deprivation experiments on monkeys could induce a primate form of Gemütlose psychopathy.
