= Thought insertion =

Delusional belief that thoughts have been inserted into one's mind

Thought insertion is defined by the ICD-10 as the delusion that one's thoughts are not one's own, but rather belong to someone else and have been inserted into one's mind. The person experiencing the thought insertion delusion will not necessarily know where the thought is coming from, but makes a distinction between their own thoughts and those inserted into their minds. However, patients do not experience all thoughts as inserted; only certain ones, normally following a similar content or pattern. A person with this delusional belief is convinced of the veracity of their beliefs and is unwilling to accept such diagnosis.

Thought insertion is a common symptom of psychosis and occurs in many mental disorders and other medical conditions. However, thought insertion is most commonly associated with schizophrenia and dissociative identity disorder. Thought insertion, along with thought broadcasting, thought withdrawal, thought blocking and other first rank symptoms, is a primary symptom and should not be confused with the delusional explanation given by the respondent. Although normally associated with some form of psychopathology, thought insertion can also be experienced in those considered nonpathological, usually in spiritual contexts, but also in culturally influenced practices such as mediumship and automatic writing.

Some patients have also stated that at some point in time they were being manipulated by an exterior or interior force (depending on the delusion that the patient faced) and only later realized that thoughts weren't theirs; this is linked to patients "losing control" of what they do.

== Unbidden thoughts ==
Unbidden thoughts are thoughts that come to mind without the subject directly or consciously meaning to think them. Inserted thoughts, while sharing the characteristic of unconsciously or indirectly being conjured, are distinct from unbidden thoughts because of the author of the thoughts. During an experience of unbidden thinking, the subject knows that they are the author of the thought even though they may not have consciously meant to think it. During the feeling of thought insertion, however, the subject feels as though the thought belongs to another person and was inserted into their own mind, making the author of the thought someone other than themselves.

== Auditory verbal hallucinations ==
Auditory hallucinations have two essential components: audibility and alienation. This differentiates it from thought insertion. While auditory hallucination does share the experience of alienation (patients cannot recognize that the thoughts they are having are self-generated), thought insertion lacks the audibility component (experiencing the thoughts as occurring outside of their mind or spoken to them). Thus the person experiencing thought insertion recognizes that the thought is being thought of inside their mind, but fail to recognize they are the one thinking it.

== Examples ==
Examples of thought insertion:

She said that sometimes it seemed to be her own thought 'but I don't get the feeling that it is'. She said her 'own thoughts might say the same thing', 'but the feeling isn't the same', 'the feeling is that it is somebody else's.'

I look out the window and I think that the garden looks nice and the grass looks cool, but the thoughts of Eamonn Andrews come into my mind. There are no other thoughts there, only his. He treats my mind like a screen and flashes thoughts onto it like you flash a picture.

The subject has thoughts that she thinks are the thoughts of other people, somehow occurring in her own mind. It is not that the subject thinks that other people are making her think certain thoughts as if by hypnosis or psychokinesis, but that other people think the thoughts using the subject's mind as a psychological medium.

== Theories ==
=== Standard approach ===
The "standard approach" is characterized by a lack of sense of agency. Most philosophers define a sense of agency as a subject's awareness that they are initiating or controlling one's own actions. According to standard approach theory, the subject does not have an awareness that they are the initiators of a thought, but they do recognize that they own the thought in that it exists within their own mind. Many have argued that the standard approach does not explain the details and the unusual pathology behind thought insertion. Typically, critiques argue that this account fails to provide a reason that distinguishes inserted thoughts from either ordinary thoughts that the subject did not deliberately try to conjure (unbidden thoughts) or other thoughts that are thought to be controlled by forces outside of the subject. As a result, other theories of thought insertion have been proposed in order to try to explain the complexities behind the phenomenon.

=== Causal-contextual ===
The causal-contextual theory of thought insertion focuses on a lack of a feeling of ownership. This theory differs from the standard approach because rather than explaining thought insertion by saying the subject lacks a sense of agency, this model explains thought insertion by theorizing that the subject lacks a sense of ownership, which in turn creates a lack of agency. Patients with schizophrenia are hypothesized to have a generalized deficit in their integration of information, illustrated through the many other symptoms of schizophrenia and psychosis. According to causal-contextual theory, sense of ownership depends on integrating causal-contextual information, and a deficit in this process accounts for the abnormal experience of thought insertion.

This model has come under criticism due to its definition of sense of ownership. In philosophy, a sense of ownership is defined as a thought that occurs within the space of one's own mind. However, in the causal-contextual model of thought insertion, sense of ownership is defined as feeling as if a thought belongs to the person thinking it. Because of this distinction, many (e.g. Seeger, Coliva) argue that the causal-contextual model is not a separate model of thought insertion, but rather a corollary of the standard approach.

== Mind-to-mind paradigm ==
Swiney and Sousa (2013) conducted an experiment to investigate thought insertion in a normal population. They attempted to create situations in which nonpathological populations would have the ability to make sense of agency misattributions in their thoughts. Participants were told that they were attached to a machine that could "transfer thoughts" from one person to another. They were then told a target word, and were to click a mouse every time they thought about the target word. However, they were only to click the mouse when they believed the target word they were thinking of was not generated by their own mind. It was stressed that the paradigm did not always work and that it was okay to not experience another person's thoughts. The vast majority (72%) of participants made at least one misattribution of agency, meaning they attributed a thought they experienced as belonging to the other participant and believed the machine had transferred the thought into their mind through the machine. This occurred after only 5 minutes. These misattributions were more frequent when the target thought was an arousing negative thought as compared to a neutral control.

== Neurology ==
Identifying brain regions associated with thought insertion has proven difficult. First, it is difficult to find subjects who experience thought insertion frequently. Second, it is difficult to do brain imaging techniques on these subjects while they are experiencing thought insertion. Therefore, most of the findings in this field come from cases of normal people under hypnosis, as evidenced in an experiment by Walsh and colleges (2015). The supplementary motor area is thought to be involved in the phenomenon of thought insertion. Thought insertion is associated with reduced activation of networks that support language, movement, and self-related processing. Specifically, thought insertion is associated with a reduction in the activity of the left supplementary motor area, basal ganglia, striatal areas, right superior occipital cortex and thalamus. An altered functional connectivity between the supplementary motor area and brain regions involved in language processing and movement implementation was also found.

=== Theory of misattributed inner speech ===
According to the model of misattributed inner speech, during the generation of inner speech, speech production areas fail to inhibit the speech perception area and this leads to a misattribution of one's thoughts to an external source.

=== Comparator-model (forward model) ===
The comparator-model, also known as the forward model, is an elaboration of theory of misattributed inner speech. This theory relies on a model involved in inner speech known as the forward model. Specifically, the comparator-model of thought insertion describes processing of movement-related sensory feedback involving a parietal-cerebellar network as subject to feedforward inhibition during voluntary movements and this is thought to contribute to the subject feeling as though thoughts are inserted into his or her mind. It has been proposed that the loss of sense of agency results from a disruption of feedforward inhibition of somatosensory processing for self-generated movements. Frith (2012) argues that delusions and hallucination are associated with a failure in the predictive component of the model. Critics of this model argue that it makes the unsupported claim that a model for movement can be transferred to account for thoughts. These critics argue that this jump cannot be made because it is not known that movements and thoughts are processed in the same way. Support for the comparator-model has also been spotty. An experiment by Walsh and colleges (2015) did not support the theory behind the forward model of thought insertion. They found that thought insertion was not associated with overactivation of somatosensory or other self-monitoring networks that occurs in movement. They argue that this provides evidence that a model for motor agency cannot explain thought agency.

=== Executive control model ===
The executive control model argues that thought insertion may be mediated by altered activity in motor planning regions, specifically the supplementary motor area. In one experiment, reduced connectivity between the supplementary motor area and motor implementation regions during suggested involuntary compared to voluntary movements was observed.

== Treatment ==
Most of the treatments for thought insertion are not specific to the symptom, but rather the symptom is treated through treatment of the psychopathology that causes it. However, one case report considers a way to manage thought insertion through performing thoughts as motor actions of speech. In other words, the patient would speak his thoughts out loud in order to re-give themself the feeling of agency as he could hear himself speaking and then attributing the thought to himself.
