= Kurt Schneider =

German psychologist (1887–1967)

- Born: 7 January 1887; Crailsheim, Kingdom of Württemberg, German Empire
- Died: 27 October 1967 (aged 80); Heidelberg, West Germany
- Education: Humboldt University of Berlin; University of Tübingen
- Occupation: Psychiatrist
- Known for: Diagnosis and understanding of schizophrenia

Kurt Schneider (7 January 1887 – 27 October 1967) was a German psychiatrist known largely for his writing on the diagnosis and understanding of schizophrenia, as well as personality disorders then known as psychopathic personalities.

== Biography ==
Schneider was born in Crailsheim, Kingdom of Württemberg in 1887. He began his psychiatric training in Cologne; however, his training was interrupted by the first World War, in which he served on the Western Front. When his post-war career began, Schneider was influenced and mentored by Max Scheler, a philosophy professor and one of the co-founders of the phenomenological movement in philosophy. Scheler served as Schneider's supervisor for his postgraduate degree in philosophy in 1921. Schneider applied Scheler's theory of emotions to his studies and this theory was the topic of his first major publications.

In 1931 he became director of the German Psychiatric Research Institute in Munich, which was founded by Emil Kraepelin. Disgusted by the developing tide of psychiatric eugenics championed by the Nazi Party, Schneider left the institute, but did serve as a doctor for the German armed forces during World War II.

After the war, academics who had not taken part in the Nazi eugenics policies were appointed to serve in, and rebuild Germany's medical institutions. Schneider was appointed Dean of the Medical School at Heidelberg University and remained there until his retirement in 1955.

== Heidelberg School of Psychiatry ==
Schneider and Karl Jaspers founded the Heidelberg school of psychiatry.

== Publications ==
Schneider also wrote and published many books and articles; his first book on psychopathic personalities in 1923 ran to nine editions and discussed the psychological differences between two sorts of depressive conditions – melancholic and reactive. Schneider's publication, “First Rank Symptoms,” remains one of his most notable contributions to the field of psychiatry and outlined the diagnostic criteria for schizophrenia. Even though he published “First Rank Symptoms” in 1939, the work remained unnoticed until much later, primarily due to the Second World War. His paper, The Stratification of Emotional Life and the Structure of Depressive States, was noted as one of the first applications of phenomenological philosophy to psychiatry. His most historically significant publication, "Clinical Psychopathology" was originally published in 1946, but it was later titled "Beiträge zur Psychiatrie". In its third edition, it was titled "Klinische Psychopathologie", before its final edition, which was translated into English as "Clinical Psychopathology".

== Contributions to psychiatry ==
Schneider was concerned with improving the method of diagnosis in psychiatry. He contributed to diagnostic procedures and the definition of disorders in the following areas of psychiatry:

=== Mood disorders ===
Schneider coined the terms endogenous depression, derived from Emil Kraepelin's use of the adjective to mean biological in origin, and reactive depression, more usually seen in outpatients, in 1920.

=== Schizophrenia ===
Like Karl Jaspers, Schneider particularly championed diagnoses based on the form, rather than the content of a sign or symptom. For example, he argued that a delusion should not be diagnosed by the content of the belief, but by the way in which a belief is held.

He was also concerned with differentiating schizophrenia from other forms of psychosis, by listing the psychotic symptoms that are particularly characteristic of schizophrenia. These have become known as Schneiderian First-Rank Symptoms or simply, first-rank symptoms.

==== First-rank symptoms ====
- Auditory hallucinations.
  - Auditory hallucinations taking the form of a voice or voices repeating the subject's thoughts out loud.
  - Auditory hallucinations discussing the subject or arguing about them and referring to them in the third person.
  - Auditory hallucinations discussing the patient's thoughts as or before they occur.
  - Auditory hallucinations taking the form of a commentary on the subject's thoughts or behavior.
- The experience of intrusion of unusual ideas or thoughts into the subject's mind as a result of the action of some external agency (thought insertion).
- The experience that the subject's thinking is no longer confined within their own mind but is shared by or is accessible to other people (thought broadcasting).
- The experience of being deprived of thought as a result of the removal of the subject's thoughts from the mind by some person or influence (thought withdrawal).
- The experience that actions, sensations, bodily movements, emotions or thought processes are generated by an outside agency that takes over the will of the subject (passivity experiences).
- Primary delusions: beliefs arising suddenly 'out of a clear blue sky' from a normal perception which would seem commonplace and unrelated to others but which nevertheless generates an unshakable delusional conviction.
- Delusional perception - the belief that a normal perception has special significance or meaning.

The reliability of using first-rank symptoms for the diagnosis of schizophrenia has since been questioned, although the terms might still be used descriptively by mental health professionals who do not use them as diagnostic aids.

Individuals with complex dissociative disorders, like dissociative identity disorder, experience significantly more first-rank symptoms than patients with schizophrenia though patients with DID lack the negative symptoms of schizophrenia and normally do not mistake hallucinations for reality. Differentiating between dissociative identity disorder and psychotic disorders is not done by listing first-rank symptoms as these conditions have a considerable overlap yet a different overall clinical picture and treatment approach.

=== Psychopathic personalities ===
Schneider also played a key role in developing concepts of psychopathy, used in a broad sense to mean personality disorder or particularly the connotation of Gemütlose psychopathy with antisocial personality disorder. He published the influential 'The Psychopathic Personalities' in 1923. This was based in part on his earlier 1921 work 'The Personality and Fate of Registered Prostitutes' where he outlined 12 character types.

Schneider sought to put psychopathy diagnoses on a morally neutral and scientific footing. He defined abnormal personality as a statistical deviation from the norm, vaguely conceptualised. He thought very creative or intelligent people had abnormal personalities by definition, but defined the psychopathic personality as those who suffered from their abnormal personality or caused suffering to society because of it. He did not see these as mental illnesses as such - thus adding to a divide, contrary to Eugen Bleuler for example, between those considered psychotic and those considered psychopathic.

Schneider's unsystematic typology was based on his clinical views. He proposed 10 psychopathic personalities: those showing abnormal mood/activity; the insecure sensitive and insecure anankastic (drifting, feckless); fanatics; self-assertive; emotionally unstable; explosive; Gemütlose; Haltlose and asthenic.

Schneider's work in this respect is said to have influenced all future descriptive typologies, including the current classifications of personality disorders in the DSM-V and ICD-11. Nevertheless, Schneider is considered to not exactly have succeeded in his attempted and claimed production of a value-free non-judgmental diagnostic system. In fact, Schneider's mixing of the medical and the moral has been described as the most noteworthy aspect of this work, which has been linked back to German reception of Cesare Lombroso's theory of the 'born criminal', redefined by Emil Kraepelin and others (see also Koch) in to psychiatric terms as a 'moral defect'. After World War I it lived on in Schneider's 'gemütlos' (compassionless) psychopaths, or what Karl Birnbaum called 'amoral' psychopaths. It has been described as remarkable that Schneider criticized Kraepelin and others for basing their personality diagnoses on moral judgments, yet appeared to do so himself. For example, Schneider admitted that the 'suffering of society' was a 'totally subjective' and 'teleological’ criterion for defining psychopathic personalities, but said that in 'scientific studies' this could be avoided by operating by the broader statistical category of abnormal personalities, which he believed were always congenital and therefore largely hereditary. The attempt to finesse the problem of value judgments has been described as 'clearly unsatisfactory'.
