= Musical hallucinations =

Neurological disorder

Musical hallucinations (also known as auditory hallucinations, auditory Charles Bonnet Syndrome, and Oliver Sacks' syndrome) describes a neurological disorder in which the patient will hallucinate songs, tunes, instruments and melodies. These hallucinations are not correlated with psychotic illness. A majority of patients who have symptoms of musical hallucinations are older and have onset conditions predisposing them to the disease. While there is no set form of treatment, research has discovered medications and alternative therapies to be successful in alleviating the hallucinations.

== Description ==
In 73 individual cases reviewed by Evers and Ellger, 57 patients heard tunes that were familiar, while 5 heard unfamiliar tunes. Keshavan found that a consistent feature of musical hallucinations was that they represented a personal memory trace. Memory traces refer to anything that may seem familiar to the patient. Tunes ranged from religious pieces to childhood favorites and popular songs from the radio. Vocal and instrumental forms of classical music were also identified in most patients.

An 84 year old in one case described her symptoms as pleasant, but also sought treatment because she felt distracted. The music she heard was similar to the hymns and songs sung at her wedding. She had been widowed for a while and had no signs of psychiatric disorders. However, she did have hypertension, hyperthyroidism, and osteoporosis, and it was theorized that the distress from these illnesses manifested the hallucinations. Researchers found that due to the unexpected origin of the hallucinations, there was no clear diagnosis or recommendation for treatment.

Another case, which studies a 74-year-old woman, described her symptoms as music that would play in short verses of patriotic and children's songs. These symptoms would occur when the patient was alone and much more frequently when driving. Researchers suspected her hearing loss as a factor for developing the hallucinations. Moreover, through further analysis the patient was found to have a medical history of hypertension, hyperlipidemia, and atrial fibrillations.

Cases are commonly found in the elderly, but in one case a 29-year-old woman reported hearing music for one week. Prior to her hallucinations, the patient had undergone surgery for intraventricular and intracranial hemorrhages. Following her recovery, she mentioned the onset of hallucinations followed by headaches. Doctors found no neurological impairments through scans. They prescribed her with quetiapine, which she responded well to. Her symptoms therefore only lasted a year.

== Causes ==
Musical hallucinations can occur in people who are physically and mentally healthy, and for them, there is no known cause. Most people find their musical hallucinations obtrusive, and wish to be rid of them, while others welcome them. In addition, investigators have pointed to factors that are associated with musical hallucinations. Evers and Ellgers compiled a significant portion of musical hallucination articles, case studies etc. and were able to categorize five major etiologies:

- Hypoacusis
- Psychiatric disorders
- Focal brain lesion
- Epilepsy
- Intoxication

=== Hypoacusis ===
Hypoacusis is defined as impairment in hearing or deafness. It was the most common of the five etiologies in the case studies reviewed by Evers and Ellgers. According to Sanchez et al. 2011, there have been suggestions that pontine lesions could alter the central auditory system's function, causing hypoacusis and musical hallucinations.

=== Psychiatric disorders ===
A case study by Janakiraman et al. 2006, revealed a 93‑year‑old woman with major depressive disorder who experienced musical hallucinations while treated with electroconvulsive therapy (ECT). Investigators found that the patient's depression symptoms were inversely related to her hallucinations and primarily stemmed from the ECT treatment. The patient had no known abnormalities in hearing, suggesting that musical hallucinations could arise from a variety of sources including psychiatric illnesses. After a complete course of ECT, her hallucinations dissipated, also suggesting that they can be acute.

According to Evers and Ellgers, some other major psychiatric disorders that contribute to musical hallucinations include schizophrenia and depression. Some patients who have schizophrenia experience musical hallucinations due to their ongoing psychosis, but there are some cases that do so without psychosis. There are also a very small percentage of musical hallucination cases due to obsessive-compulsive disorder (OCD).

Several different types of psychiatric disorders can be precursors for Musical Hallucinations. according to Blom and Coebergh, Bipolar Disorder and personality disorders can increase the chances of musical hallucinations. Likewise, cocaine dependence can elevate the symptoms.

=== Focal brain lesions ===
Among the handful of cases that Evers and Ellgers studied, major lesion sites included the temporal cortex; however, the specific location and laterality (left vs. right temporal cortex) was variable. Many cases of focal brain lesions had comorbidity with hearing impairment (see hypoacusis), epileptic activity and intoxication. There have also been several findings of acute musical hallucinations in patients with dorsal pons lesions post-stroke and encephalitis potentially due to disruption of connections between the sensory cortex and reticular formation. Also, any kind of traumatic lesion imposed on the brain can be a risk factor for Musical Hallucinations.

=== Epilepsy ===
Epileptic brain activity in musical hallucinations originates in the left or right temporal lobe. In a specific case studied by Williams et al. 2008, a patient who received a left temporal lobectomy in order to treat epilepsy was diagnosed with musical hallucinations post-surgery. The patient also had multiple additional risk factors that could have accounted for the hallucinations including mild neuropsychiatric dysfunction and tinnitus. The causation of hallucination through epilepsy is linked to seizure episodes. Through experiments, researchers have found that patients with epilepsy and hallucinations will respond to antiepileptics and surgery.

=== Intoxication ===
Intoxication accounts for a small percentage of musical hallucination cases. Intoxication leads to either withdrawal or inflammatory encephalopathy, which are major contributors to musical hallucinations. Some of the drugs that have been found to relate to musical hallucinations include salicylates, benzodiazepines, pentoxifylline, propranolol, clomipramine, amphetamine, quinine, imipramine, a phenothiazine, carbamazepine, marijuana, paracetamol, phenytoin, procaine, and alcohol. General anesthesia has also been associated with musical hallucinations. In a case study by Gondim et al. 2010, a seventy–seven-year-old woman with Parkinson's disease (PD) was administered amantadine after a year of various other antiparkinsonian treatments. Two days into her treatment, she started to experience musical hallucinations, which consisted of four musical pieces. The music persisted until three days after cessation of the drug. Although the patient was taking other medications at the same time, the timing of onset and offset suggested that amantadine either had a synergistic effect with the other drugs or simply caused the hallucinations. Although the case wasn't specific to intoxication, it leads to the idea that persons with PD who are treated with certain drugs can experience musical hallucinations.

=== Other risk factors ===
In summary, musical hallucinations can be separated into five categories according to their cause: hypoacusis, psychiatric disorders, brain lesions, epilepsy, and substance use. However, certain factors can trigger hallucinations, these factors include, old age, social isolation and even gender. Many cases highlight female patients who have the disease. Overall, psychiatric disorders and neurological disease lead to hallucinations, but certain factors, such as age and gender play a role in heightening the causation.

== Imaging ==
Positron emission tomography (PET) and functional magnetic resonance imaging (fMRI) show that musical hallucinations activate a wide variety of areas in the brain including the following: auditory areas, motor cortex, visual areas, basal ganglia, brainstem, pons, tegmentum, cerebellum, hippocampi, amygdala, and peripheral auditory system.

== Treatment ==
To date, there is no successful method of treatment that "cures" musical hallucinations. There have been successful therapies in single cases that have ameliorated the hallucinations. Some of these successes include drugs such as neuroleptics, antidepressants, and certain anticonvulsive drugs. A musical hallucination was alleviated, for example, by antidepressant medications given to patients with depression. Sanchez reported that some authors have suggested that the use of hearing aids may improve musical hallucination symptoms. They believed that the external environment influences the auditory hallucinations, showing worsening of symptoms in quieter environments than in noisier ones. Oliver Sacks' patient, Mrs. O'C, reported being in an "ocean of sound" despite being in a quiet room due to a small thrombosis or infarction in her right temporal lobe. After treatment, Mrs. O'C was relinquished of her musical experience but said that, "I do miss the old songs. Now, with lots of them, I can't even recall them. It was like being given back a forgotten bit of my childhood again." Sacks also reported another elderly woman, Mrs. O'M, who had a mild case of deafness and reported hearing musical pieces. When she was treated with anticonvulsive medications, her musical hallucinations ceased but when asked if she missed them, she said "Not on your life."

Researchers found that patients with musical hallucinations respond well to the drug Donepezil, making it another potential treatment for the condition. Donepezil, which belongs to a class of medication called acetylcholinesterase inhibitors, is most commonly used to treat dementia in patients with Alzheimer's disease. Although it cannot cure Alzheimer's, it can provide patients with a better quality of life by inhibiting the loss of function and improving the ability to think. For patients with musical hallucinations, the medication keeps them more aware and stimulated to control the onset symptoms of hallucinations. Overall, with few adverse effects, research has found that donepezil is an effective and safe choice of treatment.

== History ==
According to Oliver Sacks' Hallucinations, the first known medical report of musical hallucinations was published in 1846, by French alienist Jules Baillarger. However, the first scientific description of the disorder was reported in the early 1900s. In the last three decades, Berrios has reported case studies in 1990 and 1991 along with Keshavan et al. in 1992. Berrios concluded that confirmed diagnoses of deafness, ear disease, brain disease, advanced age and drug use are all important factors in the development of musical hallucinations. After analyzing 46 cases, Berrios found a female predominance of 80% in women over the age of 60. The study concluded that musical hallucinations were more likely to be seen in elderly women affected by deafness or brain disease than in individuals with no psychiatric illness at all.

Keshevan and Berrios were the first authors to identify classes of musical hallucinations. These classes consisted of hearing loss, coarse brain disease (i.e. tumors), epileptic disorder, stroke, and psychiatric disorder. Although no statistical analyses were performed, the authors stated that deafness was the most strongly related factor in musical hallucinations and that there was a female predominance, which could entail a genetic component.
