= Visual release hallucinations =

Experience of hallucinations by blind people

- Other names: Charles Bonnet syndrome (CBS)
- Specialty: Psychiatry, ophthalmology, optometry, neurology

Visual release hallucinations, also known as Charles Bonnet syndrome (CBS), are a type of psychophysical visual disturbance in which a person with partial or severe blindness experiences visual hallucinations.

First described by Charles Bonnet in 1760, the term Charles Bonnet syndrome was first introduced into English-speaking psychiatry in 1982. A related type of hallucination that also occurs with lack of visual input is the closed-eye hallucination.

== Signs and symptoms ==
People with significant vision loss may have vivid recurrent visual hallucinations (fictive visual percepts). These can vary greatly in apparent size, sometimes "lilliputian" (smaller than normal) and, in other cases, enlarged or expansive, as when familiar environments appear to warp in scale. Depending on the content, hallucinations are classified as either simple or complex. Simple hallucinations often involve shapes, photopsias, and grid-like patterns. Complex hallucinations may depict silent, non-interactive figures, whether multitudes of people, animals, or surreal objects, that appear life-like, as well as highly detailed landscapes or objects. The most common hallucination is of faces or cartoons.

Those affected understand that the hallucinations are not real, although in some cases, particularly when cognitive decline progresses, they may begin to perceive them as genuine. Hallucinations are purely visual, usually appearing when the eyes are open and fading once the visual gaze shifts. They are more likely to occur during periods of inactivity, and sensory deprivation is widely considered a contributing factor. Episodes typically last a few minutes and may recur several times a day or week.

Even though people of all ages may be affected by Charles Bonnet syndrome, those within the age range of 70 to 80 are primarily affected. Among older adults (> 65 years) with significant vision loss, the prevalence of Charles Bonnet syndrome has been reported to be between 10% and 40%; a 2008 Australian study found the prevalence to be 17.5%. Two Asian studies, however, report a much lower prevalence. Similarly, a systematic review of 49 studies pooling over 20,000 patients showed that the prevalence of Charles Bonnet Syndrome among ophthalmic patients is 10.2% with the highest prevalence being amongsts patients with retinal disease, glaucoma, and low vision who underwent vision rehabilitation. Additionally, older age and female sex has been found to be associated with higher prevalence of the disease. The high incidence of underreporting this disorder is the greatest hindrance to determining the exact prevalence. Underreporting is thought to be a result of those with the condition being afraid to discuss the symptoms out of fear that they will be labeled of unsound mind.

== Pathophysiology ==
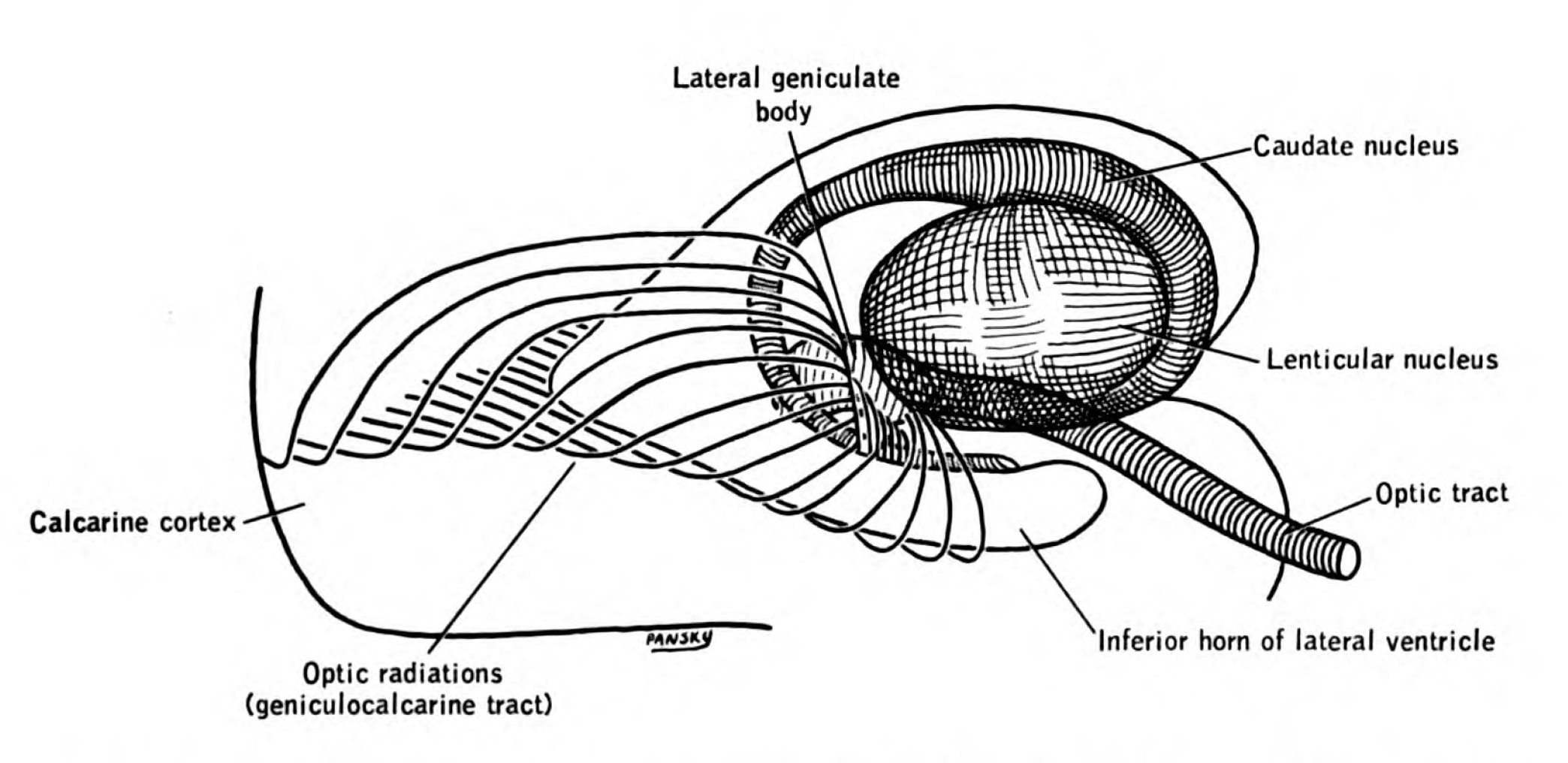
Anatomical illustration of neuroanatomy of human vision

There is no general consensus on the definition of CBS. Predominant factors correlated with CBS are a decrease of visual acuity, visual field loss, and elderly age. While characteristic features of visual hallucinations are not specifically linked to the anatomical site of the ocular injury, they usually match to the location of visual loss. The most commonly accepted theory for Charles Bonnet syndrome proposes that extreme visual impairment promotes sensory deafferentation, leading to disinhibition, thus resulting in sudden neural firings of the visual cortical regions. A few studies record that visual hallucinations are likely to be concentrated in the blind regions. Functional magnetic resonance imaging (fMRI) of Charles Bonnet syndrome patients displays a relationship between visual hallucinations and activity in the ventral occipital lobe. A connection between age-related macular degeneration (AMD) and colored visual hallucinations has been presented. Color vision signals travel through the parvocellular layers of the lateral geniculate nucleus (LGN), later transmitting down the color regions of the ventral visual pathway. Due to cone photoreceptor damage located in the macula, there is a significant reduction of visual input to the visual association cortex, stirring endogenous activation in the color areas and thus leading to colored hallucinations. Patients with CBS alongside macular degeneration exhibit hyperactivity in the color areas of the visual association cortex (as shown in fMRIs). Those who have significant ocular disease yet maintain visual acuity may still be susceptible to CBS.

The Deep Boltzmann Machine (DBM) is a way of utilizing an undirected probabilistic process in a neural framework. Researchers argue that the DBM has the ability to model features of cortical learning, perception, and the visual cortex (the locus of visual hallucinations). Compelling evidence details the role homeostatic operations in the cortex play in regards to stabilizing neuronal activity. By using the DBM, researchers show that when sensory input is absent, neuron excitability is influenced, thus potentially triggering complex hallucinations.

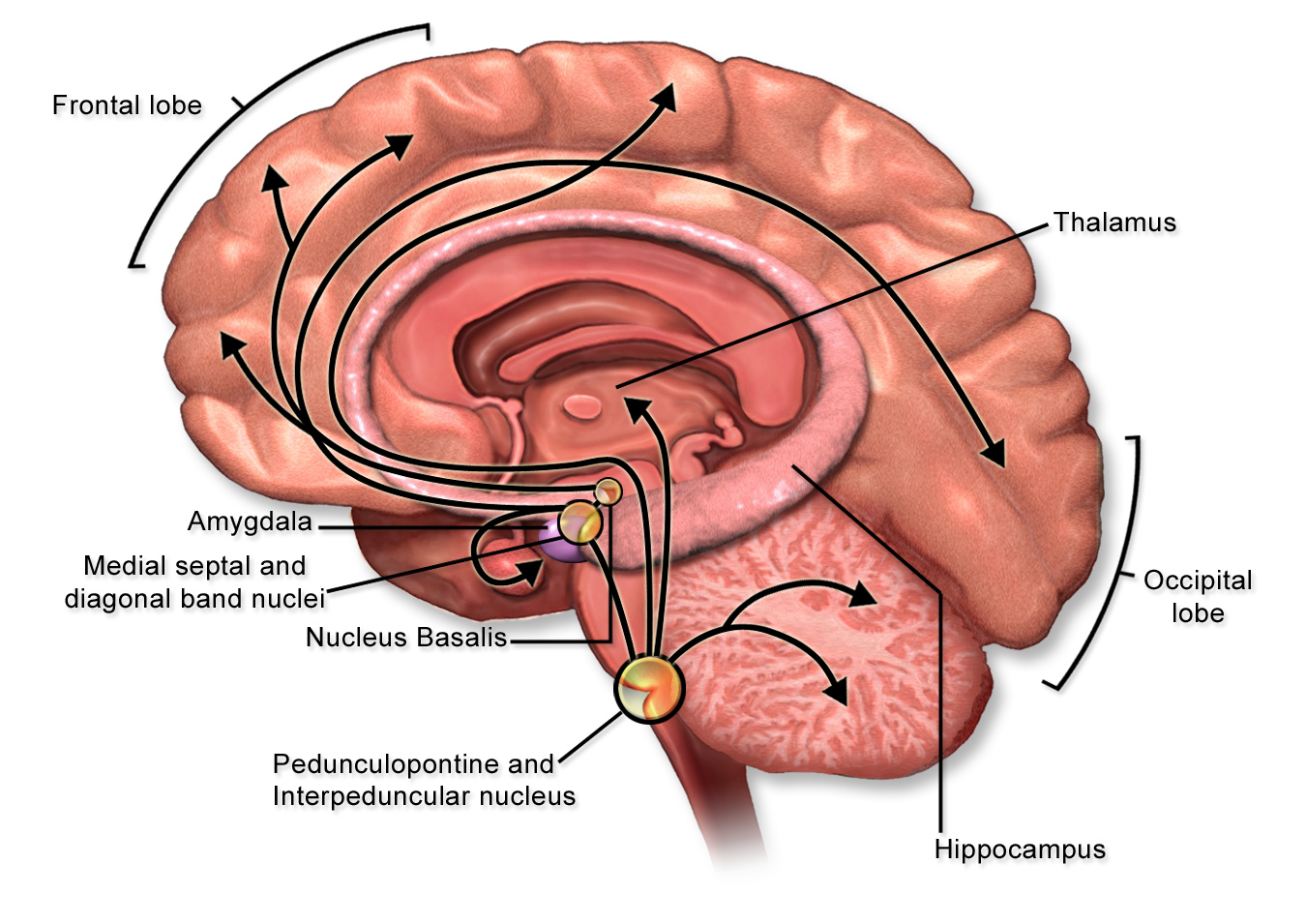
Acetylcholine pathway

A short-term change in the levels of feedforward and feedback flows of information may intensely affect the presence of hallucinations. In periods of drowsiness, CBS related hallucinations are more prone to arise. Disrupting cortical homeostatic processes after vision has been lost may prevent or setback the emergence of hallucinations. At varying stages of the cortical grading, acetylcholine (ACh) may impact the balance of thalamic and intracortical inputs as well as the balance in between bottom-up and top-down. Particularly in CBS, a shortage of acetylcholine at cortical locations should correspond to the onset of hallucinations.

The syndrome can also develop after bilateral optic nerve damage due to methyl alcohol poisoning.

== Diagnosis ==
A variety of disciplines including optometry, ophthalmology, geriatric medicine, psychiatry, and neurology play a part in securing the diagnosis of CBS. Since CBS is not commonly recognized by all clinicians, it oftentimes goes misdiagnosed and identified as psychosis, delirium, or dementia. As a result of this, it is estimated that almost 60% of CBS patients hesitate to notify their physicians. By focusing on the specific type of visual hallucination, one may find an accurate diagnosis. If a patient presents symptoms indicative of Charles Bonnet syndrome, basic laboratory examinations like metabolic panel and blood count tests, as well as neuroimaging, may aid in an accurate diagnosis.

== Treatment ==
There is no treatment of proven effectiveness for CBS. For those experiencing CBS, knowing that they have this syndrome and not a mental illness seems to be the most comforting treatment so far, as it improves their ability to cope with the hallucinations. Pharmacologic management including antipsychotics, antidepressants and mood stabilizes have been used in cases with varying results. Due to inconsistent results and associated medication side effects, non-pharmacologic management such as reassurance is currently preferred. Furthermore, treatment of underlying conditions that caused the visual loss could also remove or improve CBS associated symptoms. Those experiencing severe symptoms can also utilize behavior techniques such as repeated blinking during hallucinations, rapid eye movement from one object to another and bright lighting to engage the visual neural pathways. Lastly, social isolation, especially in the elderly has also been postulated as a possible etiological factor for CBS and therefore engaging with other individuals could also help alleviate CBS related symptoms.

== Prognosis ==
As time passes from the initial onset of visual hallucinations, studies show that around 60% of those living with CBS feel that visual hallucinations have no effect on their lives, 33% of people feel that the hallucinations are disruptive to their lives, and 7% of people even find pleasure in the hallucinations.

A large proportion of those with CBS develop the visual hallucinations as vision begins to deteriorate and stop hallucinating once vision is entirely gone. Complex hallucinations may progress over time if the primary loss of vision is due to damage of the early cortical areas. If activation of the early cortical areas is suppressed when CBS symptoms have already been exhibited, hallucinations may temporarily terminate. Also, interrupting vision for a short time by closing the eyes or blinking may be helpful.

It is possible for a stressful life event to alter the disposition of hallucinatory experiences as well as the emotional experiences (from unconcerning to concerning) in CBS. As expressed in some patients, an interplay between CBS and an acute or post-traumatic stress disorder may exist. The role that trauma plays in CBS may affect how and when a hallucinatory episode is triggered.

== History ==
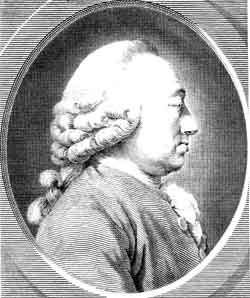
Charles Bonnet, the first person to describe the syndrome.

The disease was first noted by the Swiss naturalist Charles Bonnet, who described the condition in 1760. He documented it in his 87-year-old grandfather who was nearly blind from cataracts in both eyes. After Bonnet's grandfather received bilateral cataract surgery, his vision evolved from slightly better to complete deterioration over time. It was around this period that his visual hallucinations started. His hallucinations consisted of perceptions of men, women, birds, carriages, buildings, tapestries, physically impossible circumstances and scaffolding patterns. Even though his health was in good shape and he had an absence of any psychiatric disorders, the source of the hallucinations remained unknown. At forty years old, Charles Bonnet himself developed an unrevealed cause of severe vision loss and experienced the hallucinations.

In 1936, Jean Lhermitte and Julian de Ajuriaguerra, concluded that visual hallucinations consist of thalamic lesions as well as ocular pathology.

In 1967, French-Swiss neurologist, Georges de Morsier, coined the term Charles Bonnet syndrome in Bonnet's honor. De Morsier's description of CBS implies a concentrated neurodegeneration, usually occurring in the elderly with typical cognition. In psychiatric literature, the most commonly accepted interpretation of CBS is that of Gold and Rabins'. In 1989, they detailed that the hallucinations associated with CBS are not affecting other sensory modalities. They believed that the visual hallucinations are oftentimes stereotyped, persistent, and/or repetitive in nature.

== Society and culture ==
The syndrome is discussed in:

- Vilayanur S. Ramachandran's book Phantoms in the Brain. Ramachandran suggests that James Thurber, who was blinded in one eye as a child, may have derived his extraordinary imagination from the syndrome.
- Vikram Chandra's book Sacred Games (2006)
- David Eagleman's book Incognito: The Secret Lives of the Brain
- Oliver Sacks's 2012 book Hallucinations
- The Indian movie Jawan of Vellimala, released in 2012, in which Mammootty is a victim of the syndrome
- The Black Canvas (2014), a chamber opera by the Greek composer Spyros Syrmos, is about a celebrated painter whose visions are caused by CBS.
- Margaret Atwood's short story "Torching the Dusties"
- Deborah Lawrenson's novel The Lantern (2011)
- Gareth Brookes's graphic novel A Thousand Coloured Castles (2017)
- Dealt, 2017 documentary about notable card mechanic Richard Turner
- The 2019 Netflix film Velvet Buzzsaw
- The Doc Martin episode "One Night Only" (2022, Season 10, Episode 2) depicts Dr. Ellingham diagnosing a patient with Charles Bonnet syndrome.

== See also ==
- Sensory deprivation – Deliberate reduction or removal of stimuli
- Phantom eye syndrome
- Musical ear syndrome – Auditory hallucination associated with hearing loss
- Ganzfeld effect – Psychological phenomenon
- Hypnagogia – State of consciousness leading into sleep
- Anton–Babinski syndrome – Rare symptom of brain damage where those affected deny being blind
