= Metacognitive training =

Treatment for psychosis in schizophrenia

Metacognitive training (MCT) is an approach for treating the symptoms of psychosis in schizophrenia, especially delusions, which has been adapted for other disorders such as depression, obsessive–compulsive disorder and borderline over the years (see below). It was developed by Steffen Moritz and Todd Woodward. The intervention is based on the theoretical principles of cognitive behavioral therapy, but focuses in particular on problematic thinking styles (cognitive biases) that are associated with the development and maintenance of positive symptoms, e.g. overconfidence in errors and jumping to conclusions. Metacognitive training exists as a group training (MCT) and as an individualized intervention (MCT+).

== Background ==
Metacognition can be defined as "thinking about thinking". Over the course of the training, cognitive biases subserving positive symptoms are identified and corrected. The current empirical evidence assumes a connection between certain cognitive biases, such as jumping to conclusions, and the development and maintenance of psychosis. Accordingly, correcting these problematic/unhelpful thinking styles should lead to a reduction of symptoms.

== Intervention ==
In eight training units (modules) and two additional modules, examples of "cognitive traps", which can promote the development and maintenance of the positive symptoms of schizophrenia, are presented to patients in a playful way. Patients are instructed to critically reflect on their thought patterns, which may contribute to problematic behaviors, and to implement the contents of the training in everyday life. MCT deals with the following problematic styles of thinking: monocausal attributions, jumping to conclusions, inflexibility, problems in social cognition, overconfidence for memory errors and depressive thought patterns. The additional modules deal with stigma and low self-esteem. Individualized metacognitive training (MCT+) targets the same symptoms and cognitive biases as the group training, but is more flexible in that it allows discussion of individualized topics. The treatment materials for the group training can be obtained free of charge in over 30 languages from the website.

== Efficacy ==
A recent meta-analysis found significant improvements for positive symptoms and delusions, as well as the acceptance of the training. These findings have been replicated in 2018 and 2019. An older meta-analysis based on a smaller number of studies found a small effect, which reached significance when newer studies were considered. Individual studies provide evidence for the long-term effectiveness of the approach beyond the immediate treatment period. A meta-analysis based on 43 studies (N = 1,816 individuals) showed that MCT improved delusions, hallucinations, cognitive biases, negative symptoms and functioning. MCT is recommended as an evidence-based treatment by the Royal Australian and New Zealand College of Psychiatrists as well as the German Association for Psychiatry, Psychotherapy and Psychosomatics.

== Adaptations to other disorders ==
Since its introduction, MCT has been adapted to other mental disorders. Empirical studies have been carried out for borderline personality disorder, obsessive–compulsive disorder (self-help approach), depression, bipolar disorders, and problem gambling. MCT has also been modified to target the difficult-to-treat negative symptoms in schizophrenia, a recent feasibility study found good feasibility and improved negative symptoms.
