= Closed-eye hallucination =

Class of hallucination

Closed-eye hallucinations and closed-eye visualizations (CEV) are hallucinations that occur when one's eyes are closed or when one is in a darkened room. They are not the same as phosphenes; perceived light and shapes when pressure is applied to the eye's retina, or some other non-visual external cause stimulates the eye. Some people report CEV under the influence of psychedelics; these are reportedly of a different nature than the "open-eye" hallucinations of the same compounds. Similar hallucinations that occur due to loss of vision are called "visual release hallucinations".

== Levels of CEV perception ==
There are five known levels of CEV perception which can be achieved either through chemical stimuli or through meditative relaxation techniques. Levels 1 and 2 are very common and often happen every day. It is still normal to experience level 3, and even level 4; however, only a small percentage of the population does this without psychedelic drugs, meditation or extensive visualization training.

=== Level 1: Visual noise ===
CEV noise simulation

The most basic form of CEV perception that can be immediately experienced in the normal waking consciousness involves a seemingly random noise of pointillistic light or dark regions with no apparent shape or order. Level 1 is the most universally experienced form of CEV perception.

This can be seen when the eyes are closed and looking at the back of the eyelids. In a bright room, a dark red can be seen, owing to a small amount of light penetrating the eyelids and taking on the color of the blood it has passed through. In a dark room, blackness can be seen or the object can be more colourful. In either case, it is not a flat unchanging redness/blackness. Instead, if actively observed for a few minutes, one becomes aware of an apparent disorganized motion, a random field of lightness or darkness that overlays the redness or blackness of closed eyelids.

For a person who tries to actively observe this closed-eye perception on a regular basis, there comes a point where if they look at a flat-shaded object with their eyes wide open, and try to actively look for this visual noise, they will become aware of it and see the random pointillistic disorganized motion as if it were a translucent overlay on top of what is actually being seen by their open eyes.

CEV noise simulation with multiple colors (Purple, Green, Yellow)

When seen overlaid onto the physical world, this CEV noise does not obscure physical vision at all, and in fact is hard to notice if the visual field is highly patterned, complex, or in motion. When active observation is stopped, it is not obvious or noticeable, and seemingly disappears from normal physical perception. Individuals suffering from visual snow syndrome see similar noise but experience difficulty blocking it from conscious perception.

=== Level 2: Light or dark flashes ===
CEV noise simulation with multiple colors and flashing dot

Some mental control can be exerted over these closed-eye visualizations, but it usually requires a relaxation and concentration to achieve. When properly relaxed, it is possible to cause regions of intense black, bright white or even colors such as yellow, green, or pink to appear in the noise. These regions can span the entire visual field, but seem to be fleeting in nature.

=== Level 3: Patterns, motion, and color ===
Level 3 CEV simulation without noise

This level is relatively easily accessible to people who use psychedelic drugs such as LSD. However, it is also accessible to people involved in deep concentration for long periods of time. When lying down at night and closing the eyes, right before sleep or just before waking up, the complex motion of these patterns can become directly visible without any great effort thanks to hypnagogic hallucination. The patterns themselves might resemble fractals.

=== Level 4: Objects and things ===
This is a fairly deep state. At this level, thoughts visually manifest as objects or environments. When this level is reached, the CEV noise seems to calm down and fade away, leaving behind an intense flat ordered blackness. The visual field becomes a sort of active space. A side component of this is the ability to feel motion when the eyes are closed.

CEV noise simulation with disappearing flashing image

Opening the eyes returns one to the normal physical world, but still with the CEV object field overlaid onto it and present. In this state, it is possible to see things that appear to be physical objects in the open-eye physical world, but that are not really there.

If we remember that the essential difference between what we call the real world and the world of imagination and hallucination is not the elements of which we build them up but the sequence in which these elements appear... then it follows that the sequences directed from without represent a limitation of the otherwise unlimited combinations of the selective forms released at random from within.

— Jurij Moskvitin, Essay on the origin of thought.

=== Level 5: Overriding physical perception ===
Level 5 CEV simulation

This level can be entered from complete sensory deprivation, as experienced in an isolation tank or deep trance of hypnosis, but even there it requires great relaxation.

According to lucid dreaming researcher Stephen LaBerge, perceptions can come from either the senses or imagination. An inhibitory system involving the thalamus, likely involving serotonergic neurons, inhibits imaginary perceptions from becoming too activated so they turn into hallucinations. This system is inhibited during REM sleep, and the imagination can freely run into the perceptual systems. What happens at level 5 is likely that this system is inhibited, just like in REM sleep, by different causes like sensory deprivation, psychedelic drugs or meditative relaxation techniques.

== What is not a CEV ==
=== Afterimage (palinopsia) ===
Image burn-in occurs when very bright and static objects lie in one's field of vision, and should not be confused with closed-eye hallucinations. Visual burn-in from bright lights is visible for a few minutes after closing the eyes, or by blinking repeatedly, but the burn-in effect slowly fades away as the retina recovers, whereas the waking-consciousness CEV noise will not disappear if observed continuously over a period of time.

=== Entoptic phenomena ===
CEV does not include entoptic phenomena such as "floaters", which are instead caused by opacities in the vitreous humour and often appear as cells or strands in the field of vision. Full-closing and reopening the eyelids creates a very definite wiper-ridge in the tear film that is readily visible. Fully closing and reopening the eyelids also often stirs up the vitreous which settles down after a brief moment due to gravity. The motion of waking-consciousness CEV noise is not so directly and physically controllable and repeatable.

=== Blue-sky sprites ===
CEV does not seem to be related to the "sprites" (blue field entoptic phenomenon) that can be seen as dots darting around when staring up into a bright blue sky on a sunny day (not looking at the sun). These dots superimposed over a flat blue background are white blood cells moving through the blood vessels of the retina. The motion of waking-consciousness CEV noise is uniformly random compared to the waking-consciousness blue-sky sprite motion.

=== Physical retinal stimulation ===
CEV is unrelated to the visual noise seen when the retina is physically stimulated. The retina can be made to produce light patterns of visual noise simply by one rubbing their eyes somewhat forcefully in a manner that increases intraocular pressure. Additionally, retinal noise can be produced by touching near the rear of the eyeball producing pressure phosphenes (for example, if one closes one's eyes, looks all the way left, and lightly touches the rightmost part of the eye socket, this produces visual noise in the shape of a circle that appears at the left side of the visual field – a practice that is neither painful nor dangerous). None of these are closed-eye hallucinations, but rather the experience of mechanical stimuli distorted into visual stimuli. Thus, pressure phosphenes are sensory distortions, and not hallucinations, as the latter is an unreal perception in the absence of stimuli.

== See also ==
- Dark retreat – Tibetan Buddhism advanced practice
- Eigengrau – Illusionary dark gray color
- Entoptic phenomenon – Visual effect whose source is within the eye itself
- Form constant – Recurringly observed geometric pattern
- Ganzfeld effect – Psychological phenomenon
- Hallucinogen – Class of drugs
- Hallucinogen persisting perception disorder – Persistence of visual distortions after using drugs
- Haidinger's brush – Visible effect of polarised light
- Prisoner's cinema – Visual phenomenon involving seeing animated lights in the darkness
- Psychedelic replication
