= Matthew Manning =

British author and healer

- Born: 17 August 1955 (age 71)
- Occupations: Author and psychic

Matthew Manning (born 17 August 1955) is a British author. As a child he and his family were allegedly subjected to a range of poltergeist disturbances in their homes in Cambridge and Linton and as a boarder at Oakham School in Rutland.

== Life ==
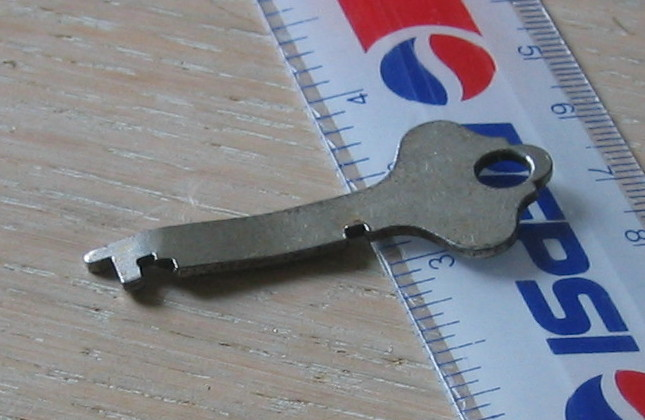
Key claimed to have been bent psychokinetically by Manning

In the 1960s, it was alleged that Manning was the focus of sustained poltergeist activity. These allegations were investigated by the Cambridge mathematician and psychical researcher, A. R. G. Owen. From 1971, long scripts appeared on Manning's bedroom walls, apparently penned by signatories from the seventeenth century onward. Manning realised that he could quell this poltergeist activity through the practice of automatic drawing and writings. It was noted at the time that Manning had been researching history as part of his school work. According to Joe Nickell who made an in-depth study of Manning's writings, they contain internal inconsistencies and the "signatures" are completely inaccurate for historical individuals. Nickell concluded that Manning has "traits associated with a fantasy-prone personality" and there is no evidence he possesses genuine paranormal powers.

Regarding his automatic drawings, he claimed to draw in the styles of many famous artists including Pablo Picasso. Manning told The San Francisco Examiner that an art expert at Sotheby's in London had thought one of his Picasso copies so good it might be mistaken for an original. The sceptic James Randi investigated this claim by writing to the gallery. A Sotheby's official replied that the claim was "absolutely not true" as they were forgeries of existing works. Manning told the London Daily Mirror his drawing of a monkey had caused "great excitement" because it was strikingly similar to an original by Jan Savery that the Rijksmuseum kept locked away from public display in a vault. This was also investigated by Randi who wrote a letter to the museum and it was discovered the claim was false as the original was on display to the public, not locked up in a vault.

Manning was also tested for psychokinetic abilities by parapsychologist William G. Braud of the Mind Science Foundation in the late 1970s, with results that, according to Braud and coauthors in a psychical research paper published in 1979, were better than chance. Additionally during this time, it was reported that he could "bend metal paranormally, affect electrical equipment, move compass needles, and make medical diagnoses." The magician John Booth has written Manning's metal bending is a magic trick performed while lightly stroking the object. The physicists John Taylor and Eduardo Balanovski tested Manning in distance viewing and the results proved "completely unsuccessful".

The events of his childhood and later investigations by George Owen of the Cambridge Psychical Research Society were published in a 1974 book entitled The Link.

== Bibliography ==
- The Link : The Extraordinary Gifts of a Teenage Psychic. Colin Smythe Ltd (1974) ISBN 0-86140-283-9
- In The Minds Of Millions. W.H. Allen / Virgin Books (1977) ISBN 0-491-02340-5
- The Strangers. W.H. Allen / Virgin Books (1978) ISBN 0-491-02333-2
- Matthew Manning's Guide To Self Healing. (Foreword by Brian Roet) HarperCollins Publishers Ltd (1989) ISBN 0-7225-1626-6
- No Faith Required. Colin Smythe Ltd (1995) ISBN 82-90601-09-3
- One Foot in the Stars. Piatkus Books (1999) ISBN 0-7499-2463-2
- The Healing Journey. Piatkus Books (2002) ISBN 0-7499-2308-3
- Your Mind Can Heal Your Body. Piatkus Books (2007) ISBN 0-7499-2712-7
