= Haidinger's brush =

Visible effect of polarised light

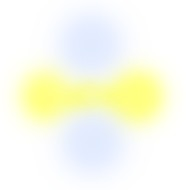
Simulated appearance of Haidinger's brush for vertically polarized light. Size and intensity exaggerated for clarity. Orientation varies with that of polarization of light source.

Haidinger's brush, more commonly known as Haidinger's brushes is an image produced by the eye, an entoptic phenomenon, first described by Austrian physicist Wilhelm Karl von Haidinger in 1844. Haidinger saw it when he looked through various minerals that polarized light.

Many people are able to perceive polarization of light. Haidinger's brushes may be seen as a yellowish horizontal bar or bow-tie shape (with "fuzzy" ends, hence the name "brush") visible in the center of the visual field against the blue sky viewed while facing approximately 90° from the sun, or on any bright background. Haidinger's yellow bar is observed perpendicular to the direction of light polarization (i.e., if light polarization is vertical, then Haidinger's yellow bar is observed horizontal - like around dawn and dusk, the natural skylight maximum polarization around the north and south horizon is almost vertical as per Rayleigh sky model and so Haidinger's yellow bar is observed horizontal). The perception of this effect vanishes within a few seconds due to neural adaptation unless the observer rotates the eyes (like by moving the head sideways). It typically occupies roughly 3–5 degrees of vision, about twice or three times the width of one's thumb held at arm's length. Fainter bluish or purplish areas may be visible between the yellow brushes (see illustration). Haidinger's brush may also be seen by looking at a white area on many LCD flat panel computer screens (due to the polarization effect of the display), in which case it is often diagonal.

== Physiological causes ==
Haidinger's brush is usually attributed to the dichroism of the xanthophyll pigment found in the macula lutea. As described by the Fresnel laws, the behavior and distribution of oblique rays in the cylindrical geometry of the foveal blue cones produce an extrinsic dichroism. The size of the brush is consistent with the size of the macula.

It is thought that the macula's dichroism arises from some of its pigment molecules being arranged circularly; (the small proportion of circularly arranged molecules accounts for the faintness of the phenomenon.) Xanthophyll pigments tend to be parallel to the retinal ganglion cell axons that (because the fovea is not flat) are almost orthogonal to the fovea in its central part but nearly parallel in its outer region. As a result, two different areas of the fovea can be sensitive to two different degrees of polarization.

== Seeing Haidinger's brush ==
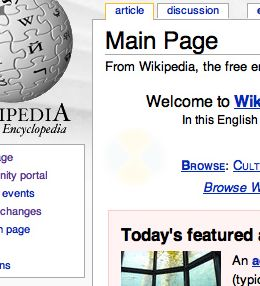
Simulated appearance of a computer screen viewed through a polarizer, showing typical size and intensity of Haidinger's brush

Many people find it difficult to see Haidinger's brush initially. It is very faint, much more so than generally indicated in illustrations, and, like other stabilized images, tends to appear and disappear.

It is most easily seen when it can be made to move. Because it is always positioned on the macula, there is no way to make it move laterally, but it can be made to rotate, by viewing a white surface through a rotating polarizer, or by slowly tilting one's head to one side.

To see Haidinger's brush, start by using a polarizer, such as a lens from a pair of polarizing sunglasses. Gaze at an evenly lit, textureless surface through the lens and rotate the polarizer.

An option is to use the polarizer built into a computer's LCD screen. Look at a white area on the screen, and slowly tilt the head (this method generally works only with LCDs, as most other electronic visual display technologies do not emit polarized light).

It appears with more distinctness against a blue background. With practice, it is possible to see it in the naturally polarized light of a blue sky. Minnaert recommended practicing first with a polarizer, then trying it without. The areas of the sky with the strongest polarization are those 90 degrees away from the sun. Minnaert said that after a minute of gazing at the sky, "a kind of marble effect will appear. This is followed shortly by Haidinger's brush." He commented that not all observers see it in the same way. Some see the yellow pattern as solid and the blue pattern as interrupted, as in the illustrations on this page. Some see the blue as solid and the yellow as interrupted, and some see it alternating between the two states.

== Use ==
The fact that the sensation of Haidinger's brush corresponds with the visual field of the macula means that it can be utilised in training people to look at objects with their macula. People with certain types of strabismus may undergo an adaptation whereupon they look at the object of attention not with their fovea (at the centre of the macula) but with an eccentric region of the retina. This adaptation is known as eccentric fixation. To aid in training a person to look at an object with their fovea rather than their eccentric retinal zone, a training device can be used. One such apparatus utilises a rotating polarised plate backlit with a bright white light. Wearing blue spectacles (to enhance the Haidinger's brush image) and an occluder over the other eye, the user will hopefully notice the Haidinger's brush where their macula correlates with their visual field. The goal of the training is for the user to learn to look at the test object in such a way that the Haidinger's brush overlaps the test object (and the viewer is thus now looking at it with their fovea). The reason for such training is that the healthy fovea is far greater in its resolving power than any other part of the retina. Another diagnostic method that utilises birefringent properties of the retinal tissue is retinal birefringence scanning, that can be used in case of severe amblyopia or when the specialist lacks a cooperation from the patient.

== See also ==
- Floater
- Haidinger fringe
- Isolation tank
- Prisoner's cinema
