= Ganzfeld =

Ganzfeld (German for "complete field") is a particular phenomenon of visual perception. The term is used most commonly in relationship to:

- Ganzfeld effect, the psychological result of staring at an actual Ganzfeld
- Ganzfeld experiment, a technique in parapsychology
