= Entopic =

Entopic may refer to:

- A medical term meaning in the usual place, as opposed to ectopic
- Entopic graphomania, a surrealistic technique involving automatic writing
- Entoptic phenomenon, visual effects arising from within the eye, often misspelled entopic
- Entopic, a Dutch company active in content marketing
