= Entoptic phenomenon =

Visual effect whose source is within the eye itself

Entoptic phenomena (from Ancient Greek ἐντός (entós) 'within' and ὀπτικός (optikós) 'visual') are visual effects whose source is within the human eye itself.

In Helmholtz's words: "Under suitable conditions, light falling on the eye may render visible, certain objects within the eye itself. These perceptions are called entoptical."

== Overview ==
Entoptic images have a physical basis in the image cast upon the retina. Hence, they are different from optical illusions, which are caused by the visual system and characterized by a visual percept that (loosely said) appears to differ from reality. Because entoptic images are caused by phenomena within the observer's own eye, they share one feature with optical illusions and hallucinations: the observer cannot share a direct and specific view of the phenomenon with others.

Helmholtz commented on entoptic phenomena which could be seen easily by some observers, but could not be seen at all by others. This variance is not surprising because the specific aspects of the eye that produce these images are unique to each individual. Because of the variation between individuals, and the inability for two observers to share a nearly identical stimulus, these phenomena are unlike most visual sensations. They are also unlike most optical illusions which are produced by viewing a common stimulus. This notwithstanding, there is enough commonality among main entoptic phenomena for their physical origin to now be well understood.

== Examples ==
Some examples of entoptical effects include:

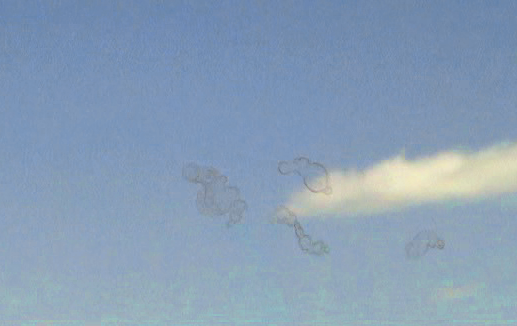
Floaters depiction

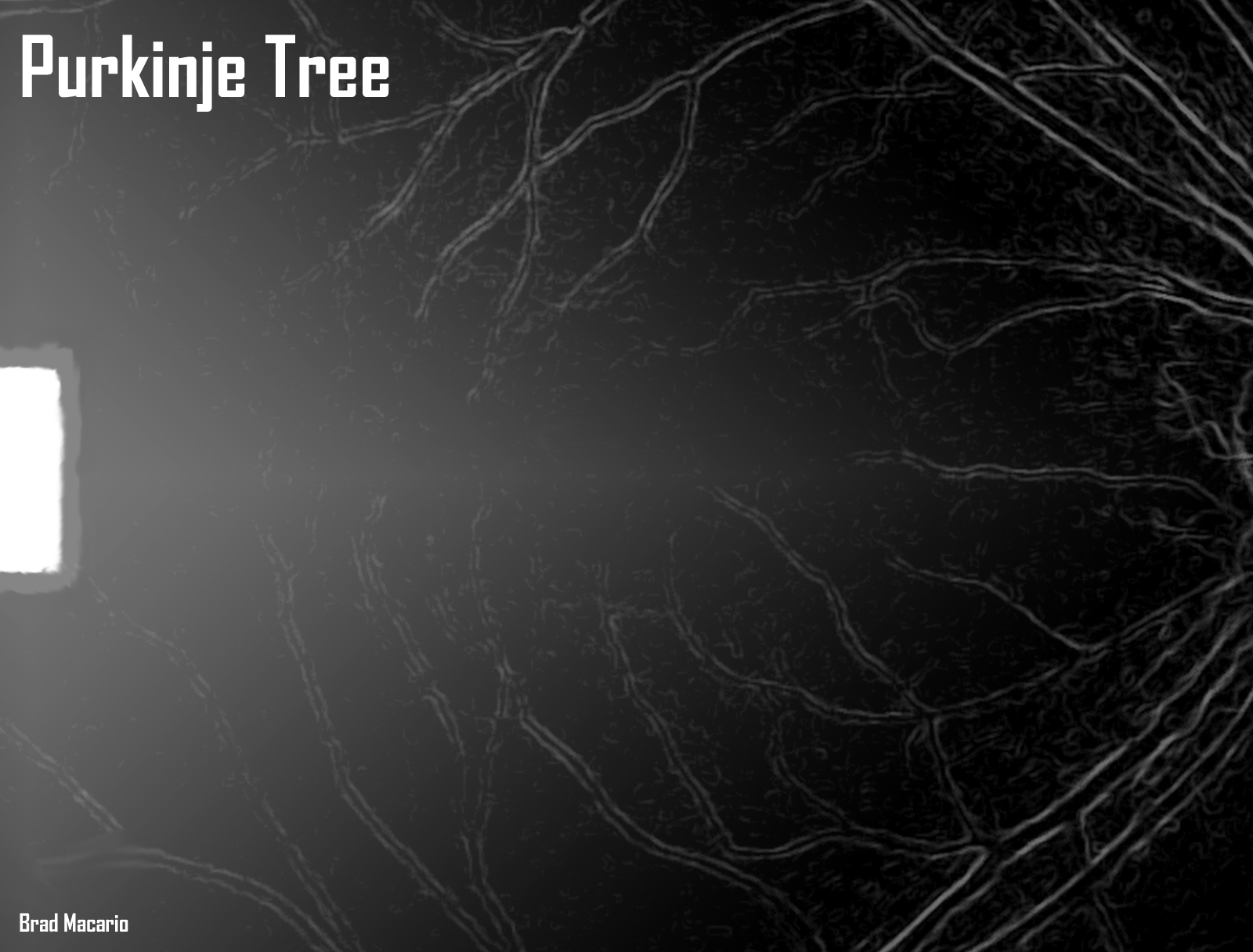
Purkinje tree depiction

- Floaters or muscae volitantes are slowly drifting blobs of varying size, shape, and transparency, which are particularly noticeable when viewing a bright, featureless background (such as the sky) or a point source of diffuse light very close to the eye. They are shadow images of objects floating in liquid between the retina and the gel inside the eye known as the vitreous humor. They are visible because they move; were they pinned to the retina by the vitreous or fixed in position within the vitreous itself they would be as invisible as other objects fixed in position within the eye, such as the retinal blood vessels. Some may be individual red blood cells swollen due to osmotic pressure. Others may be chains of red blood cells stuck together; diffraction patterns can be seen around these. Others may be "coagula of the proteins of the vitreous gel, to embryonic remnants, or the condensation round the walls of Cloquet's canal" that exist in pockets of liquid within the vitreous. The first two sort of floaters may collect over the fovea (the center of vision), and therefore be more visible, when a person is lying on his or her back looking upwards.
- Blue field entoptic phenomenon has the appearance of tiny bright dots moving rapidly along squiggly lines in the visual field. It is much more noticeable when viewed against a field of pure blue light and is caused by white blood cells moving in the capillaries in front of the retina. White cells are larger than red blood cells and can be larger than the diameter of a capillary, so must deform to fit. As a large, deformed white blood cell goes through a capillary, a space opens up in front of it and red blood cells pile up behind. This makes the dots of light appear slightly elongated with dark tails.
- Haidinger's brush is a very subtle bowtie or hourglass shaped pattern that is seen when viewing a field with a component of blue light that is plane or circularly polarized. It's easier to see if the polarisation is rotating with respect to the observer's eye, although some observers can see it in the natural polarisation of sky light. If the light is all blue, it will appear as a dark shadow; if the light is full spectrum, it will appear yellow. It is due to the preferential absorption of blue polarized light by pigment molecules in the fovea.
- Purkinje images are the reflections from the anterior and posterior surfaces of the cornea and the anterior and posterior surfaces of the lens. Although these first four reflections are not entoptic — they are seen by others who are looking at someone's eye — Becker described how light can reflect from the posterior surface of the lens and then again from the anterior surface of the cornea to focus a second image on the retina, this one much fainter and inverted. Tscherning referred to this as the sixth image (the fifth image is formed by reflections from the anterior surfaces of the lens and cornea to form an image too far in front of the retina to be visible) and noted it was much fainter and best seen with a relaxed emmetropic eye. To see it, one must be in a dark room, with one eye closed; one must look straight ahead while moving a light back and forth in the field of the open eye. Then one should see the sixth Purkinje as a dimmer image moving in the opposite direction.
- The Purkinje tree is an image of the retinal blood vessels in one's own eye, first described by Purkyně in 1823. It can be seen by shining the beam of a small bright light through the pupil from the periphery of a subject's vision. This results in an image of the light being focused on the periphery of the retina. Light from this spot then casts shadows of the blood vessels (which lie on top of the retina) onto unadapted portions of the retina. Normally the image of the retinal blood vessels is invisible because of adaptation. Unless the light moves, the image disappears within a second or so. If the light is moved at about 1 Hz, adaptation is defeated, and a clear image can be seen indefinitely. The vascular figure is often seen by patients during an ophthalmic examination when the examiner is using an ophthalmoscope. Another way in which the shadows of blood vessels may be seen is by holding a bright light against the eyelid at the corner of the eye. The light penetrates the eye and casts a shadow on the blood vessels as described previously. The light must be jiggled to defeat adaptation. Viewing in both cases is improved in a dark room while looking at a featureless background. This topic is discussed in more detail by Helmholtz.
- Purkinje's blue arcs are associated with the activity of the nerves sending signals from where a spot of light is focused on the retina near the fovea to the optic disk. To see it, one needs to look at the right edge of a small red light in a dark room with the right eye (left eye closed) after dark-adapting for about 30 seconds; one should see two faint blue arcs starting at the light and heading towards the blind spot. When one looks at the left edge, one will see a faint blue spike going from the light to the right.
- A phosphene is the perception of light without light actually entering the eye, for instance caused by pressure applied to the closed eyes.

A phenomenon that could be entoptical if the eyelashes are considered to be part of the eye is seeing light diffracted through the eyelashes. The phenomenon appears as one or more light disks crossed by dark blurry lines (the shadows of the lashes), each having fringes of spectral colour. The disk shape is given by the circular aperture of the pupil.

== See also ==
- Circular birefringence – Rotation of the plane of linearly polarized light as it travels through a chiral material
- Endaural phenomena
- Form constant – Recurringly observed geometric pattern
- Hypnagogia – State of consciousness leading into sleep
- Isolation tank – Sensory deprivation tank
- Macula – Oval-shaped pigmented area near the center of the retina
- Nucleation – Initial step in the phase transition or molecular self-assembly of a substance
- Prisoner's cinema – Visual phenomenon involving seeing animated lights in the darkness
- Psionics – Science fiction theme of 1950s and 1960s
- Scintillating scotoma – Visual aura associated with migraine
- Theory of Colours
- Visual snow – Visual impairment

== Sources ==
- Jan E. Purkyně, 1823: Beiträge zur Kenntniss des Sehens in subjectiver Hinsicht in Beobachtungen und Versuche zur Physiologie der Sinne, In Commission der J.G. Calve'schen Buchhandlung, Prag.
- H. von Helmholtz, Handbuch der Physiologischen Optik, published as "Helmholtz's Treatise on Physiological Optics, Translated from the Third German Edition," ed. James P. C. Southall; 1925; The Optical Society of America.
- Leonard Zusne, 1990: Anomalistic Psychology: A Study of Magical Thinking; Lea; ISBN 0-8058-0508-7
- Becker, O., 1860, "Über Wahrnehmung eines Reflexbildes im eigenen Auge [About perception of a reflected image in your own eye]," Wiener Medizinische Wochenschrift, pp. 670 672 & 684 688.
- M. Tscherning, 1920, Physiologic Optics; Third Edition, (English translation by C. Weiland). Philadelphia: Keystone Publishing Co. pp. 55–56.
- White, Harvey E., and Levatin, Paul, 1962, "'Floaters' in the eye," Scientific American, Vol. 206, No. 6, June, 1962, pp. 199 127.
- Duke Elder, W. S. (ed.), 1962, System of Ophthalmology, Volume 7, The Foundations of Ophthalmology: heredity pathology diagnosis and therapeutics, St. Louis, The C.V. Mosby Company. p450.
- Snodderly, D.M., Weinhaus, R.S., & Choi, J.C. (1992). Neural-vascular relationships in central retina of Macaque monkeys (Macaca fascicularis). Journal of Neuroscience, 12(4), 1169-1193. Available online at: http://www.jneurosci.org/cgi/reprint/12/4/1169.pdf.
- Sinclair, S.H., Azar-Cavanagh, M., Soper, K.A., Tuma, R.F., & Mayrovitz, H.N. (1989). Investigation of the source of the blue field entoptic phenomenon. Investigative Ophthalmology & Visual Science, 30(4), 668-673. Available online at: http://www.iovs.org/.
- Giles Skey Brindley, Physiology of the Retina and Visual Pathway, 2nd ed. (Edward Arnold Ltd., London, 1970), pp. 140–141.
- Bill Reid, "Haidinger's brush," Physics Teacher, Vol. 28, p. 598 (Dec. 1990).
- Walker, J., 1984, "How to stop a spinning object by humming and perceive curious blue arcs around the light," Scientific American, February, Vol. 250, No. 2, pp. 136 138, 140, 141, 143, 144, 148.
