= Phosphene =

Visual illusion

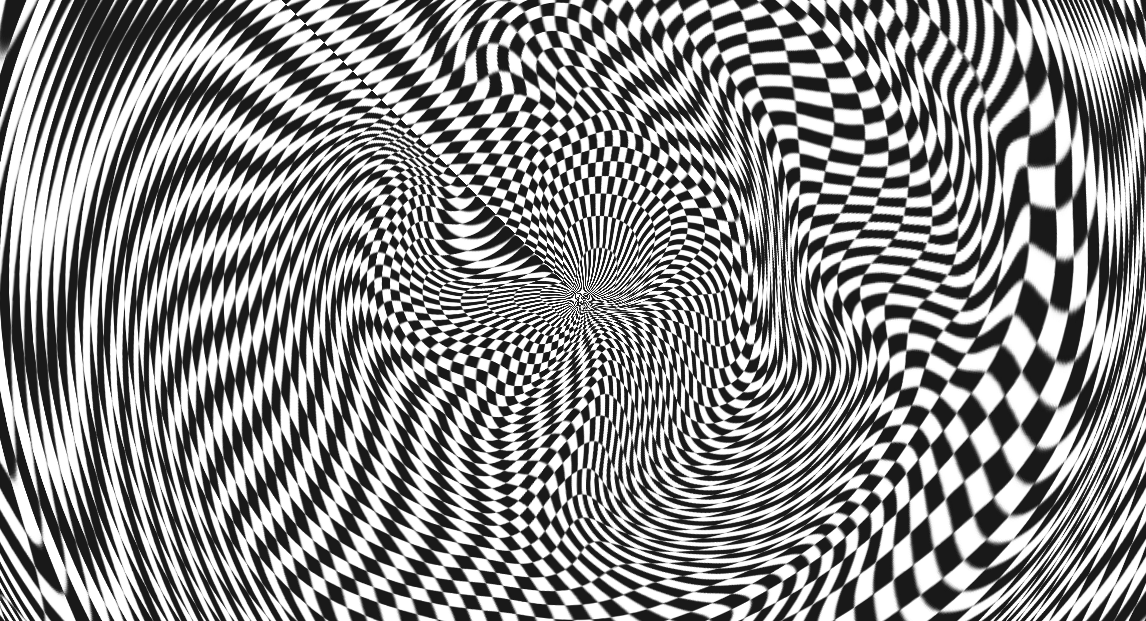
An artist's representation of how some people may see phosphenes by retinal stimulation

A phosphene (from Greek, phos (light) and phainein (to show)) is the phenomenon of seeing light without light entering the eye. Phosphenes can be induced by mechanical, electrical, or magnetic stimulation of the retina or visual cortex, or by random firing of cells in the visual system. Phosphenes that are induced by movement or sound may be associated with optic neuritis. Phosphenes have also been reported by meditators (called nimitta), people who endure long periods without visual stimulation (the prisoner's cinema), or those who ingest psychedelic drugs.

== Causes ==
=== Mechanical stimulation ===
The most common phosphenes are pressure phosphenes, caused by rubbing or applying pressure on or near the closed eyes. They have been known since antiquity, evidenced by its description in early Greek texts. The pressure mechanically stimulates the cells of the retina. Experiences include a darkening of the visual field that moves against the rubbing, a diffuse colored patch that also moves against the rubbing, well defined shapes such as bright circles that exist near or opposite to where pressure is being applied, a scintillating and ever-changing and deforming light grid with occasional dark spots (like a crumpling fly-spotted flyscreen), and a sparse field of intense blue points of light. Pressure phosphenes can persist briefly after the rubbing stops and the eyes are opened, allowing the phosphenes to be seen on the visual scene. Hermann von Helmholtz and others have published drawings of their pressure phosphenes. One example of a pressure phosphene is demonstrated by gently pressing the side of one's eye and observing a colored ring of light on the opposite side, as detailed by Isaac Newton.

Another common phosphene is "seeing stars" from a sneeze, laughter, a heavy and deep cough, blowing of the nose, a blow on the head or low blood pressure (such as on standing up too quickly or prior to fainting). It is possible these involve some mechanical stimulation of the retina, but they may also involve mechanical and metabolic (such as from low oxygenation or lack of glucose) stimulation of neurons of the visual cortex or of other parts of the visual system.

Less commonly, phosphenes can also be caused by some diseases of the retina and nerves, such as multiple sclerosis. The British National Formulary lists phosphenes as an occasional side effect of at least one anti-anginal medication.

The name "phosphene" was coined by the French physician Henri Savigny, better known as the ship's surgeon of the wrecked French frigate Méduse. It was first employed by Serre d'Uzes to test retinal function prior to cataract surgery.

=== Electrical stimulation ===
Phosphenes have been created by electrical stimulation of the brain, reported by neurologist Otfrid Foerster as early as 1929. Brindley and Lewin (1968) inserted a matrix of stimulating electrodes directly into the visual cortex of a 52-year-old blind female, using small pulses of electricity to create phosphenes. These phosphenes were points, spots, and bars of colorless or colored light. Brindley and Rushton (1974) used the phosphenes to create a visual prosthesis, in this case by using the phosphenes to depict Braille spots. Research has shown phosphenes can be elicited by electrical stimulation in individuals suffering terminal blindness.

In recent years, researchers have successfully developed experimental brain–computer interfaces or neuroprostheses that stimulate phosphenes to restore vision to people blinded through accidents. Notable successes include the human experiments by William H. Dobelle and Mark Humayun and animal research by Dick Normann.

A noninvasive technique that uses electrodes on the scalp, transcranial magnetic stimulation, has also been shown to produce phosphenes.

Experiments with humans have shown that when the visual cortex is stimulated above the calcarine fissure, phosphenes are produced in the lower part of the visual field, and vice versa.

=== Others ===
Phosphenes have been produced by intense, changing magnetic fields, such as with transcranial magnetic stimulation (TMS). These fields can be positioned on different parts of the head to stimulate cells in different parts of the visual system. They also can be induced by alternating currents that entrain neural oscillation as with transcranial alternating current stimulation. In this case they appear in the peripheral visual field. This claim has been disputed. The alternative hypothesis is that current spread from the occipital electrode evokes phosphenes in the retina. Phosphenes created by magnetic fields are known as magnetophosphenes.

Astronauts exposed to radiation in space have reported seeing phosphenes. Patients undergoing radiotherapy have reported seeing blue flashes of light during treatment; the underlying phenomenon has been shown to resemble Cherenkov radiation.

Phosphenes can be caused by some medications, such as ivabradine.

== Mechanism ==
Most vision researchers believe that phosphenes result from the normal activity of the visual system after stimulation of one of its parts from some stimulus other than light. For example, Grüsser et al. showed that pressure on the eye results in activation of retinal ganglion cells in a similar way to activation by light. An ancient, discredited theory is that light is generated in the eye. A version of this theory has been revived, except, according to its author, that "phosphene lights are [supposed to be] due to the intrinsic perception of induced or spontaneous increased biophoton emission of cells in various parts of the visual system (from retina to cortex)"

== Anthropological research ==
In 1988, David Lewis-Williams and T. A. Dowson published an article about phosphenes and other entoptic phenomena. They argued that non-figurative art of the Upper Paleolithic depicts visions of phosphenes and neurological "form constants", probably enhanced by hallucinogenic drugs.

== Research ==
Research has looked into visual prosthesis for the blind, which involves use of arrays of electrodes implanted in the skull over the occipital lobe to produce phosphenes. There have been long term implants of this type. Risks, such as infections and seizures, have been an impediment to their development.

A possible use of phosphenes as part of a brain-to-brain communication system has been reported. The system called BrainNet, produces phosphenes using transcranial magnetic stimulation (TMS). The goal of the research is to connect thoughts brain to brain using a system where signals are detected using electroencephalography (EEG) and delivered using transcranial magnetic stimulation (TMS). An experiment was conducted with five different groups, each containing three people. The subjects were split into two groups. Two subjects functioned as the senders, and were connected to EEG electrodes, and a third person functioned as the receiver, who wore the TMS helmet. Each person was stationed in front of a television screen with a Tetris-style game. The senders had to determine if there was a need to rotate the falling blocks, but without the ability to rotate them – only the receiver was able to perform this operation. At the edges of each screen, were two icons with two flashing lights in two different frequencies, (one at 15 Hz and the other at 17 Hz). The sender focused on one icon, or the other to signal that the block should be rotated to the right or the left. The EEG produced a unique signal, which was transmitted to the TMS helmet of the receiver, who perceived phosphenes which differed for the 15 Hz and 17 Hz signal, and rotated the block in the relevant direction. The experiment achieved 81% success.

== See also ==
- Closed-eye hallucination – Class of hallucination
- Dark retreat – Tibetan Buddhism advanced practice
- HPPD – Persistence of visual distortions after using drugs
- Isolation tank – Sensory deprivation tank
- Photopsia – Presence of perceived flashes of light in one's field of vision
- Prisoner's cinema – Visual phenomenon involving seeing animated lights in the darkness
- Scintillating scotoma – Visual aura associated with migraine
- Visual snow – Visual impairment
