= William G. Braud =

American psychologist and parapsychologist

William G. Braud (November 26, 1942 – May 13, 2012) was an American psychologist and parapsychologist.

Braud obtained his Ph.D. in experimental psychology from the University of Iowa. He was director of research in parapsychology at the Mind Science Foundation. He taught at the Institute of Transpersonal Psychology (1992–2010).

During the 1970s and early 1980s he conducted a series of experiments to test for psychokinetic influences upon living systems. Braud with Charles Honorton were the first to modify the ganzfeld procedure for parapsychological use.

== Selected publications ==
- Transpersonal Research Methods For the Social Sciences: Honoring Human Experience (SAGE Publications, 1998) [with Rosemarie Anderson]
- Distant Mental Influence: Its Contributions To Science, Healing, and Human Interactions (Hampton Roads Publishing Company, 2003)
- Transforming Self and Others Through Research: Transpersonal Research Methods and Skills for the Human Sciences and Humanities (SUNY Press, 2011) [with Rosemarie Anderson ]
