= Haidinger fringe =

Phenomena in optics

In optics, Haidinger fringes are interference fringes formed by the interference of monochromatic and coherent light to form visible dark and bright fringes. Fringe localization is the region of space where fringes with reasonably good contrast are observed.

Haidinger fringes are fringes localized at infinity. Also known as fringes of equal inclination, these fringes result when light from an extended source falls on a thin film made of an optically denser medium. These fringes indicate the positions where light interferes, emerging from the medium at an equal angle. They are also observed in Fabry-Pérot and Michelson interferometers. They can be observed by introducing a converging lens between the film and observation plane with focus of the lens lying in observation plane.

== See also ==
- Wilhelm Karl Ritter von Haidinger
- Haidinger's brush
