= Endaural phenomena =

Endaural phenomena are sounds that are heard without any external acoustic stimulation. Endaural means "in the ear". Phenomena include transient ringing in the ears (that sound like sine tones), white noise-like sounds, and subjective tinnitus. Endaural phenomena need to be distinguished from otoacoustic emissions, in which a person's ear emits sounds. The emitter typically cannot hear the sounds made by his or her ear. Endaural phenomena also need to be distinguished from auditory hallucinations, which are sometimes associated with psychosis.

== See also ==
- Bruit
- Entoptic phenomenon
