= Ganzfeld effect =

Psychological phenomenon

The ganzfeld effect (from German for "complete field"), or perceptual deprivation, is a phenomenon of perception caused by exposure to an unstructured, uniform stimulation field. The effect is the result of the brain amplifying neural noise in order to look for the missing visual signals. The noise is interpreted in the higher visual cortex, and gives rise to hallucinations. People with aphantasia are less likely to experience these pseudo-hallucinations.

It has been most studied with vision by staring at an undifferentiated and uniform field of color. The visual effect is described as the loss of vision as the brain cuts off the unchanging signal from the eyes. The result is "seeing black", an apparent sense of blindness. A flickering ganzfeld causes geometrical patterns and colors to appear, and this is the working principle for mind machines and the dreamachine.

Ganzfeld induction in multiple senses is called multi-modal ganzfeld. This is usually done by wearing ganzfeld goggles in addition to headphones with a uniform stimulus.

A related effect is sensory deprivation, although in this case a stimulus is minimized rather than unstructured. Hallucinations that appear under prolonged sensory deprivation are similar to elementary percepts caused by luminous ganzfeld, and include transient sensations of light flashes or colours. Hallucinations caused by sensory deprivation can, like ganzfeld-induced hallucinations, turn into complex scenes.

William G. Braud with Charles Honorton were the first to modify the ganzfeld procedure for parapsychological use. The effect is a component of the ganzfeld experiment, a technique used in the field of parapsychology.

== History ==
In the 1930s, research by psychologist Wolfgang Metzger established that when subjects gazed into a featureless field of vision they consistently hallucinated and their electroencephalograms changed.

The ganzfeld effect has been reported since ancient times. The adepts of Pythagoras retreated to pitch-black caves to receive wisdom through their visions, known as the prisoner's cinema. Miners trapped by accidents in mines frequently reported hallucinations, visions and seeing ghosts when they were in the pitch dark for days. Arctic explorers seeing nothing but featureless landscape of white snow for a long time also reported hallucinations and an altered state of mind.

== See also ==
- Ganzfeld experiment – Pseudoscientific test for extrasensory perception (ESP)
- Visual release hallucinations – Experience of hallucinations by blind people
- Closed-eye hallucination – Class of hallucination
- Dark retreat – Tibetan Buddhism advanced practice
- Hypnagogia – State of consciousness leading into sleep
- Isolation tank – Sensory deprivation tank
- Nucleus basalis – Group of neurons in the brain
- Sensory deprivation – Deliberate reduction or removal of stimuli
- Third Man factor – Comforting presence perceived during stress
- James Turrell – American artist known for work with light
