= Wave interference =

Phenomenon resulting from the superposition of two waves

The interference of two waves. In phase: the two lower waves combine (left panel), resulting in a wave of added amplitude (constructive interference). Out of phase: (here by 180 degrees), the two lower waves combine (right panel), resulting in a wave of zero amplitude (destructive interference).

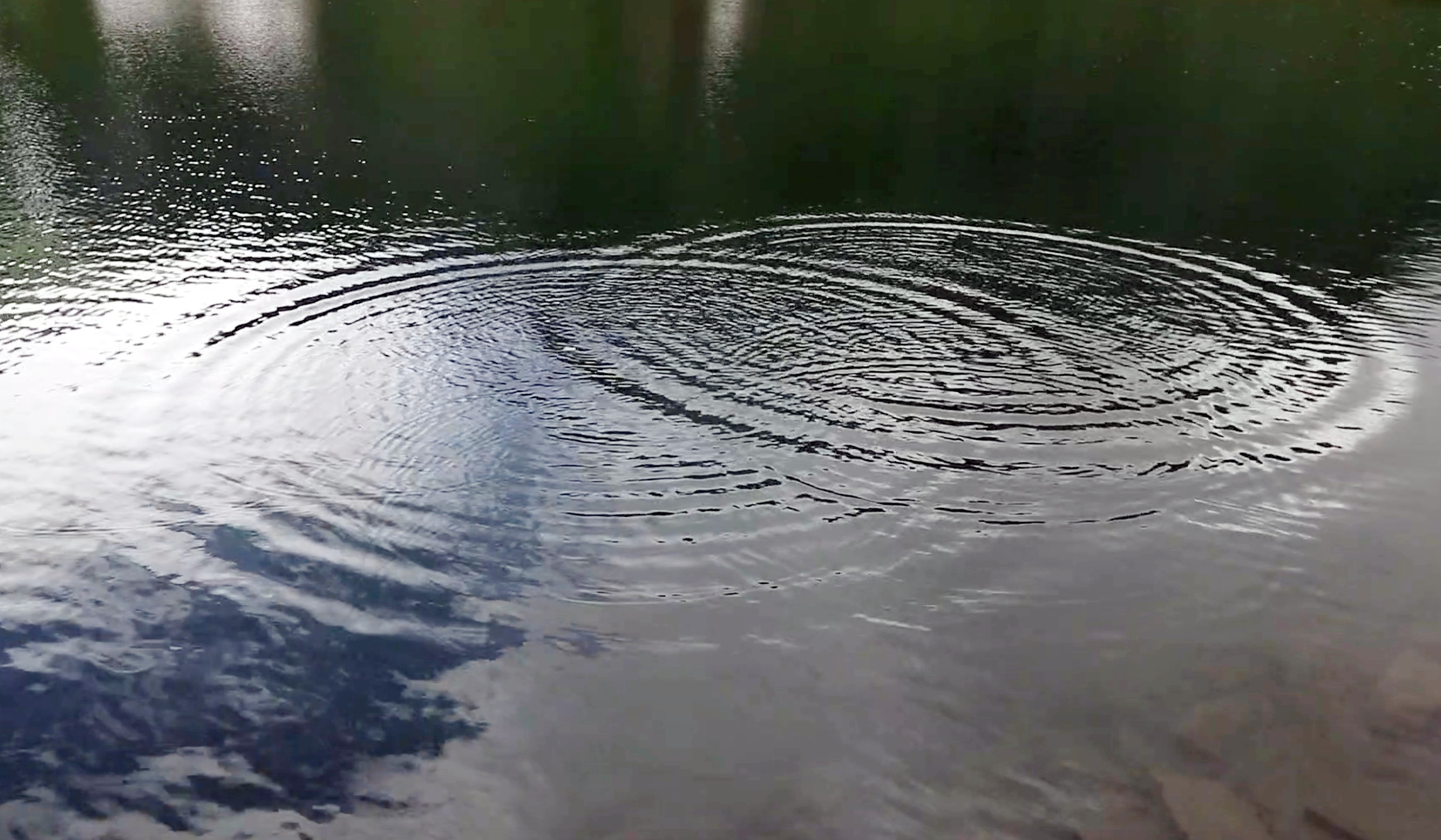
Interfering water waves on the surface of a lake

In physics, interference is a phenomenon in which two coherent waves are combined by adding their intensities or displacements with due consideration for their phase difference. The resultant wave may have greater amplitude (constructive interference) or lower amplitude (destructive interference) if the two waves are in phase or out of phase, respectively. Interference effects can be observed with all types of waves, for example, light, radio, acoustic, surface water waves, gravity waves, or matter waves as well as in loudspeakers as electrical waves.

== History ==
Around 1800, the word interference was used by Thomas Young in developing his theories of acoustics and optics.

== Mechanisms ==
Interference of right traveling (green) and left traveling (blue) waves in Two-dimensional space, resulting in final (red) wave

Interference of waves from two point sources

Cropped tomography scan animation of laser light interference passing through two pinholes (side edges)

The principle of superposition of waves states that when two or more propagating waves of the same type are incident on the same point, the resultant amplitude at that point is equal to the vector sum of the amplitudes of the individual waves. If a crest of a wave meets a crest of another wave of the same frequency at the same point, then the amplitude is the sum of the individual amplitudes—this is constructive interference. If a crest of one wave meets a trough of another wave, then the amplitude is equal to the difference in the individual amplitudes—this is known as destructive interference. In ideal mediums (water, air are almost ideal) energy is always conserved, at points of destructive interference, the wave amplitudes cancel each other out, and the energy is redistributed to other areas. For example, when two pebbles are dropped in a pond, a pattern is observable; but eventually waves continue, and only when they reach the shore is the energy absorbed away from the medium.

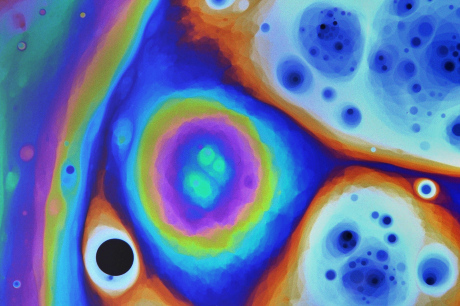
Photograph of 1.5cm x 1cm region of soap film under white light. Varying film thickness and viewing geometry determine which colours undergo constructive or destructive interference. Small bubbles significantly affect surrounding film thickness.

Constructive interference occurs when the phase difference between the waves is an even multiple of π (180°), whereas destructive interference occurs when the difference is an odd multiple of π. If the difference between the phases is intermediate between these two extremes, then the magnitude of the displacement of the summed waves lies between the minimum and maximum values.

Consider, for example, what happens when two identical stones are dropped into a still pool of water at different locations. Each stone generates a circular wave propagating outwards from the point where the stone was dropped. When the two waves overlap, the net displacement at a particular point is the sum of the displacements of the individual waves. At some points, these will be in phase, and will produce a maximum displacement. In other places, the waves will be in anti-phase, and there will be no net displacement at these points. Thus, parts of the surface will be stationary—these are seen in the figure above and to the right as stationary blue-green lines radiating from the centre.

Interference of light is a unique phenomenon in that we can never observe superposition of the EM field directly as we can, for example, in water. Superposition in the EM field is an assumed phenomenon and necessary to explain how two light beams pass through each other and continue on their respective paths. Prime examples of light interference are the famous double-slit experiment, laser speckle, anti-reflective coatings and interferometers.

In addition to the classical wave model for understanding optical interference, quantum matter waves also demonstrate interference.

=== Real-valued wave functions ===
The above can be demonstrated in one dimension by deriving the formula for the sum of two waves. The equation for the amplitude of a sinusoidal wave traveling to the right along the x-axis is
$$W_1(x,t) = A\cos(kx - \omega t)$$
where $A$ is the peak amplitude, $k = 2\pi/\lambda$ is the wavenumber and $\omega = 2\pi f$ is the angular frequency of the wave. Suppose a second wave of the same frequency and amplitude but with a different phase is also traveling to the right
$$W_2(x,t) = A\cos(kx - \omega t + \varphi)$$
where $\varphi$ is the phase difference between the waves in radians. The two waves will superpose and add: the sum of the two waves is
$$W_1 + W_2 = A[\cos(kx - \omega t) + \cos(kx - \omega t + \varphi)].$$
Using the trigonometric identity for the sum of two cosines: $\cos a + \cos b = 2\cos\left({a-b \over 2}\right)\cos\left({a+b \over 2}\right),$ this can be written
$$W_1 + W_2 = 2A\cos\left({\varphi \over 2}\right)\cos\left(kx - \omega t + {\varphi \over 2}\right).$$
This represents a wave at the original frequency, traveling to the right like its components, whose amplitude is proportional to the cosine of $\varphi/2$.

- Constructive interference: If the phase difference is an even multiple of π: $\varphi = \ldots,-4\pi, -2\pi, 0, 2\pi, 4\pi,\ldots$ then $\left|\cos(\varphi/2)\right| = 1$, so the sum of the two waves is a wave with twice the amplitude
  $$W_1 + W_2 = 2A\cos(kx - \omega t)$$
- Destructive interference: If the phase difference is an odd multiple of π: $\varphi = \ldots,-3\pi,\, -\pi,\, \pi,\, 3\pi,\, 5\pi,\ldots$ then $\cos(\varphi/2) = 0\,$, so the sum of the two waves is zero
  $$W_1 + W_2 = 0$$

=== Between two plane waves ===
Geometrical arrangement for two plane wave interference

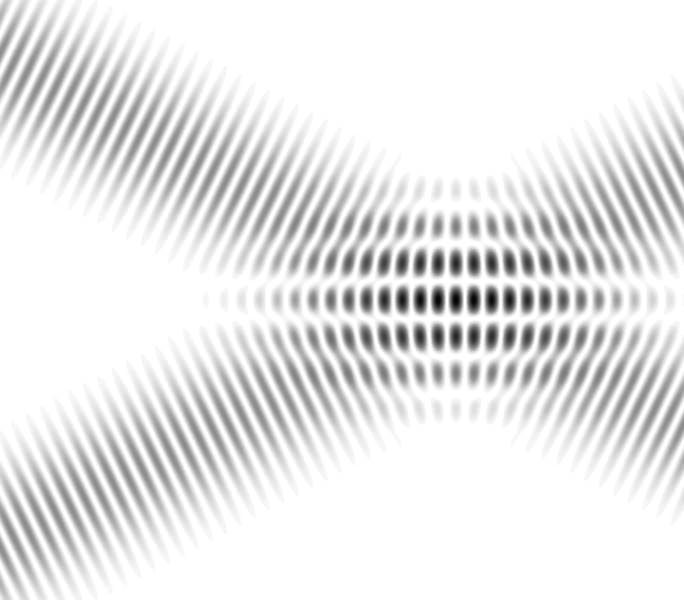
Interference fringes in overlapping plane waves

A simple form of interference pattern is obtained if two plane waves of the same frequency intersect at an angle. One wave is travelling horizontally, and the other is travelling downwards at an angle θ to the first wave. Assuming that the two waves are in phase at the point B, then the relative phase changes along the x-axis. The phase difference at the point A is given by

$$\Delta \varphi = \frac {2 \pi d} {\lambda} = \frac {2 \pi x \sin \theta} {\lambda}.$$

It can be seen that the two waves are in phase when

$$\frac {x \sin \theta} {\lambda} = 0, \pm 1, \pm 2, \ldots ,$$

and are half a cycle out of phase when

$$\frac {x \sin \theta} {\lambda} = \pm \frac {1}{2}, \pm \frac {3}{2}, \ldots$$

Constructive interference occurs when the waves are in phase, and destructive interference when they are half a cycle out of phase. Thus, an interference fringe pattern is produced, where the separation of the maxima is

$$d_f = \frac {\lambda} {\sin \theta}$$

and d_{f} is known as the fringe spacing. The fringe spacing increases with increase in wavelength, and with decreasing angle θ.

The fringes are observed wherever the two waves overlap and the fringe spacing is uniform throughout.

=== Between two spherical waves ===
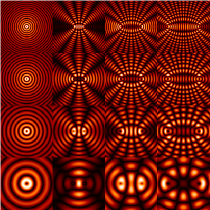
Optical interference between two point sources that have different wavelengths and separations of sources.

A point source produces a spherical wave. If the light from two point sources overlaps, the interference pattern maps out the way in which the phase difference between the two waves varies in space. This depends on the wavelength and on the separation of the point sources. The figure to the right shows interference between two spherical waves. The wavelength increases from top to bottom, and the distance between the sources increases from left to right.

When the plane of observation is far enough away, the fringe pattern will be a series of almost straight lines, since the waves will then be almost planar.

=== Multiple beams ===
Interference occurs when several waves are added together provided that the phase differences between them remain constant over the observation time.

It is sometimes desirable for several waves of the same frequency and amplitude to sum to zero (that is, interfere destructively, cancel). This is the principle behind, for example, 3-phase power and the diffraction grating. In both of these cases, the result is achieved by uniform spacing of the phases.

It is easy to see that a set of waves will cancel if they have the same amplitude and their phases are spaced equally in angle. Using phasors, each wave can be represented as $A e^{i \varphi_n}$ for $N$ waves from $n=0$ to $n = N-1$, where
$$\varphi_n - \varphi_{n-1} = \frac{2\pi}{N}.$$

To show that
$$\sum_{n=0}^{N-1} A e^{i \varphi_n} = 0$$

one merely assumes the converse, then multiplies both sides by $e^{i \frac{2\pi}{N}}.$

The Fabry–Pérot interferometer uses interference between multiple reflections.

A diffraction grating can be considered to be a multiple-beam interferometer; since the peaks which it produces are generated by interference between the light transmitted by each of the elements in the grating; see interference vs. diffraction for further discussion.

== Optical wave interference ==
Creation of interference fringes by an optical flat on a reflective surface. Light rays from a monochromatic source pass through the glass and reflect off both the bottom surface of the flat and the supporting surface. The tiny gap between the surfaces means the two reflected rays have different path lengths. In addition the ray reflected from the bottom plate undergoes a 180° phase reversal. As a result, at locations (a) where the path difference is an odd multiple of λ/2, the waves reinforce. At locations (b) where the path difference is an even multiple of λ/2 the waves cancel. Since the gap between the surfaces varies slightly in width at different points, a series of alternating bright and dark bands, interference fringes, are seen.

Because the frequency of light waves (~10^{14} Hz) is too high for currently available detectors to detect the variation of the electric field of the light, it is possible to observe only the intensity of an optical interference pattern. The intensity of the light at a given point is proportional to the square of the average amplitude of the wave. This can be expressed mathematically as follows. The displacement of the two waves at a point r is:

$$U_1 (\mathbf r,t) = A_1(\mathbf r) e^{i [\varphi_1 (\mathbf r) - \omega t]}$$
$$U_2 (\mathbf r,t) = A_2(\mathbf r) e^{i [\varphi_2 (\mathbf r) - \omega t]}$$

where A represents the magnitude of the displacement, φ represents the phase and ω represents the angular frequency.

The displacement of the summed waves is

$$U (\mathbf r,t) = A_1(\mathbf r) e^{i [\varphi_1 (\mathbf r) - \omega t]}+A_2(\mathbf r) e^{i [\varphi_2 (\mathbf r) - \omega t]}.$$

The intensity of the light at r is given by

$$I(\mathbf r) = \int U (\mathbf r,t) U^* (\mathbf r,t) \, dt \propto A_1^2 (\mathbf r)+ A_2^2 (\mathbf r) + 2 A_1 (\mathbf r) A_2 (\mathbf r) \cos [\varphi_1 (\mathbf r)-\varphi_2 (\mathbf r)].$$

This can be expressed in terms of the intensities of the individual waves as

$$I(\mathbf r) =  I_1 (\mathbf r)+ I_2 (\mathbf r) + 2 \sqrt{ I_1 (\mathbf r) I_2 (\mathbf r)} \cos [\varphi_1 (\mathbf r)-\varphi_2 (\mathbf r)].$$

Thus, the interference pattern maps out the difference in phase between the two waves, with maxima occurring when the phase difference is a multiple of 2π. If the two beams are of equal intensity, the maxima are four times as bright as the individual beams, and the minima have zero intensity.

Classically the two waves must have the same polarization to give rise to interference fringes since it is not possible for waves of different polarizations to cancel one another out or add together. Instead, when waves of different polarization are added together, they give rise to a wave of a different polarization state.

Quantum mechanically the theories of Paul Dirac and Richard Feynman offer a more modern approach. Dirac showed that every quanta or photon of light acts on its own which he famously stated as "every photon interferes with itself". Richard Feynman showed that by evaluating a path integral where all possible paths are considered, that a number of higher probability paths will emerge. In thin films for example, film thickness which is not a multiple of light wavelength will not allow the quanta to traverse, only reflection is possible.

=== Light source requirements ===
The discussion above assumes that the waves which interfere with one another are monochromatic, i.e. have a single frequency—this requires that they are infinite in time. This is not, however, either practical or necessary. Two identical waves of finite duration whose frequency is fixed over that period will give rise to an interference pattern while they overlap. Two identical waves which consist of a narrow spectrum of frequency waves of finite duration (but shorter than their coherence time), will give a series of fringe patterns of slightly differing spacings, and provided the spread of spacings is significantly less than the average fringe spacing, a fringe pattern will again be observed during the time when the two waves overlap.

Conventional light sources emit waves of differing frequencies and at different times from different points in the source. If the light is split into two waves and then re-combined, each individual light wave may generate an interference pattern with its other half, but the individual fringe patterns generated will have different phases and spacings, and normally no overall fringe pattern will be observable. However, single-element light sources, such as sodium- or mercury-vapor lamps have emission lines with quite narrow frequency spectra. When these are spatially and colour filtered, and then split into two waves, they can be superimposed to generate interference fringes. All interferometry prior to the invention of the laser was done using such sources and had a wide range of successful applications.

A laser beam generally approximates much more closely to a monochromatic source, and thus it is much more straightforward to generate interference fringes using a laser. The ease with which interference fringes can be observed with a laser beam can sometimes cause problems in that stray reflections may give spurious interference fringes which can result in errors.

Normally, a single laser beam is used in interferometry, though interference has been observed using two independent lasers whose frequencies were sufficiently matched to satisfy the phase requirements. This has also been observed for widefield interference between two incoherent laser sources.

It is also possible to observe interference fringes using white light. A white light fringe pattern can be considered to be made up of a 'spectrum' of fringe patterns each of slightly different spacing. If all the fringe patterns are in phase in the centre, then the fringes will increase in size as the wavelength decreases and the summed intensity will show three to four fringes of varying colour. Young describes this very elegantly in his discussion of two slit interference. Since white light fringes are obtained only when the two waves have travelled equal distances from the light source, they can be very useful in interferometry, as they allow the zero path difference fringe to be identified.

=== Optical arrangements ===
To generate interference fringes, light from the source has to be divided into two waves which then have to be re-combined. Traditionally, interferometers have been classified as either amplitude-division or wavefront-division systems.

In an amplitude-division system, a beam splitter is used to divide the light into two beams travelling in different directions, which are then superimposed to produce the interference pattern. The Michelson interferometer and the Mach–Zehnder interferometer are examples of amplitude-division systems.

In wavefront-division systems, the wave is divided in space—examples are Young's double slit interferometer and Lloyd's mirror.

Interference can also be seen in everyday phenomena such as iridescence and structural coloration. For example, the colours seen in a soap bubble arise from interference of light reflecting off the front and back surfaces of the thin soap film. Depending on the thickness of the film, different colours interfere constructively and destructively.

Iridiscence caused by thin-film interference

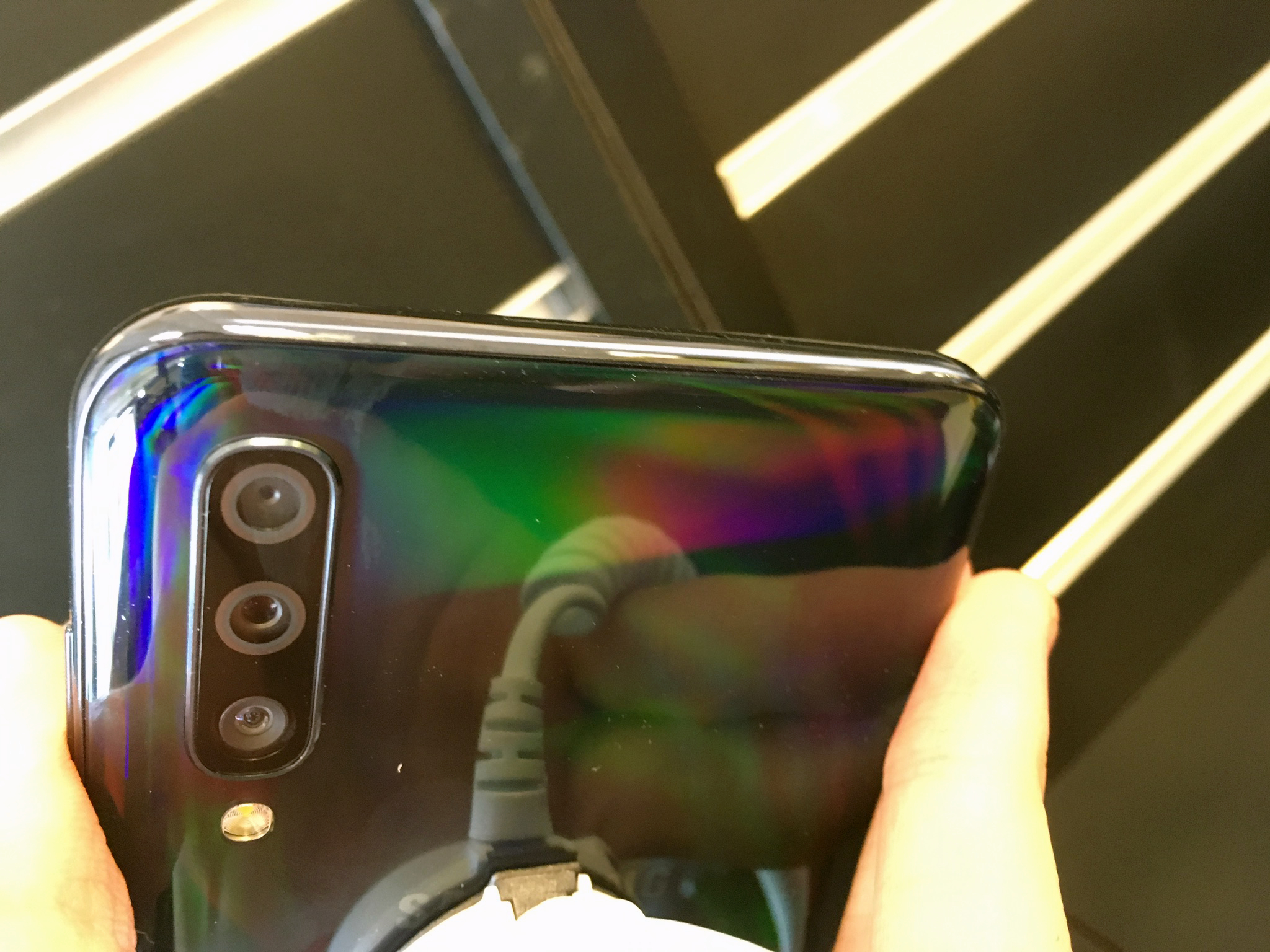
Smartphone with iridescent back panel

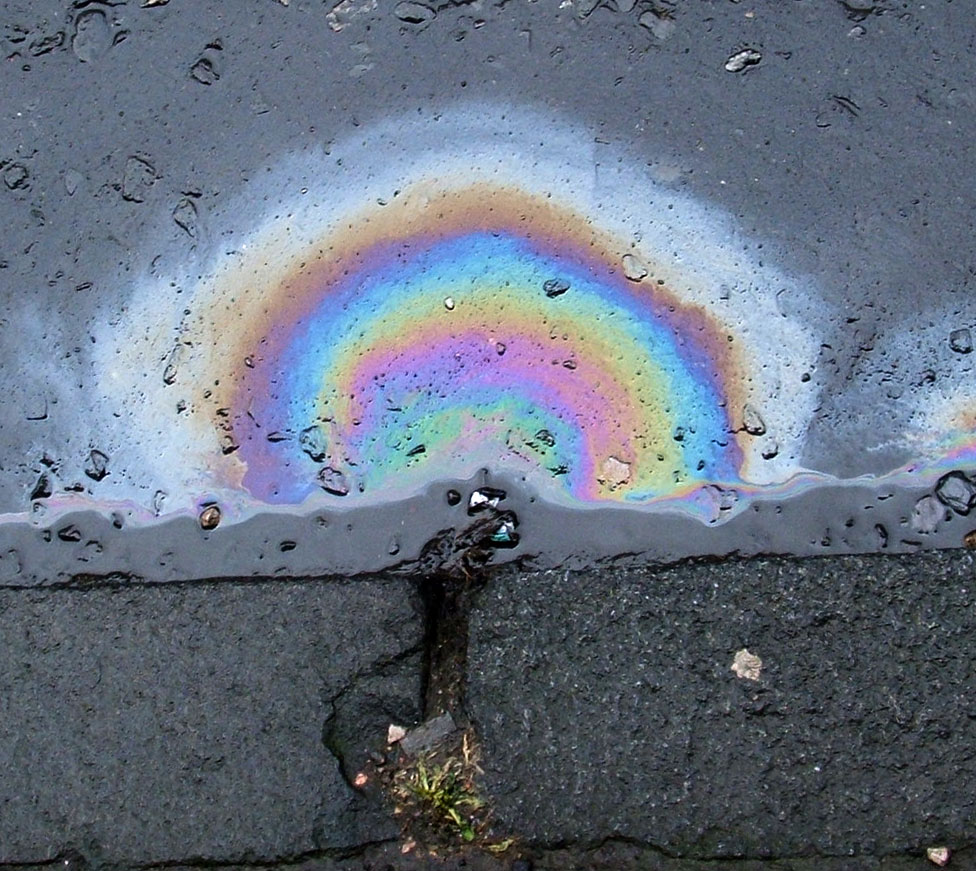
An oil spill

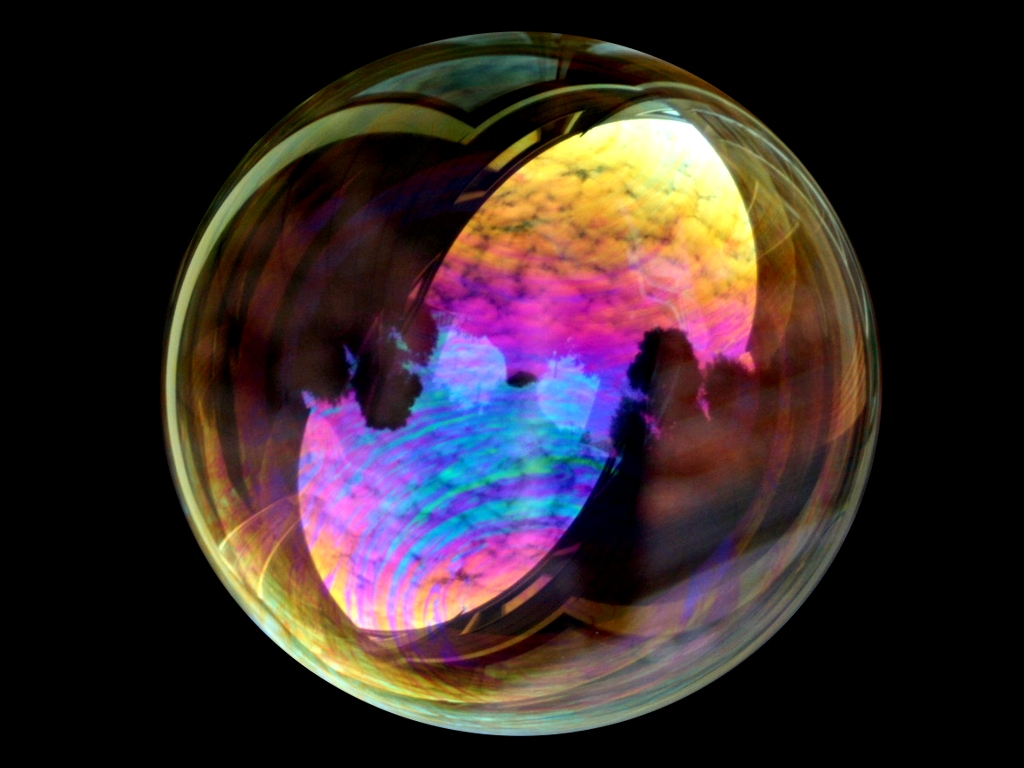
White light interference in a soap bubble.

== Quantum interference ==
Quantum interference – the observed wave-behavior of matter – resembles optical interference. Let $\Psi (x, t)$ be a wavefunction solution of the Schrödinger equation for a quantum mechanical object. Then the probability of observing the object in the interval $[a,b]$ is $P([a,b]) = \int_a^b |\Psi (x, t)|^2 dx = \int_a^b \Psi^* (x, t) \Psi (x, t) dx$ where * indicates complex conjugation. Quantum interference concerns the issue of this probability when the wavefunction is expressed as a sum or linear superposition of two terms $\Psi (x, t) = \Psi_A (x, t) + \Psi_B (x, t)$:
$$P([a,b]) = \int_a^b |\Psi (x, t)|^2 = \int_a^b (|\Psi_A (x, t)|^2 +  |\Psi_B (x, t)|^2 + \Psi_A^* (x, t) \Psi_B (x, t) + \Psi_A (x, t) \Psi_B^* (x, t)) dx$$

Usually, $\Psi_A (x, t)$ and $\Psi_B (x, t)$ correspond to distinct situations A and B. When this is the case, the equation $\Psi (x, t) = \Psi_A (x, t) + \Psi_B (x, t)$ indicates that the object can be in situation A or situation B. The above equation can then be interpreted as: The probability of finding the object at $x$ is the probability of finding the object at $x$ when it is in situation A plus the probability of finding the object at $x$ when it is in situation B plus an extra term. This extra term, which is called the quantum interference term, is $\Psi_A^* (x, t) \Psi_B (x, t) + \Psi_A (x, t) \Psi_B^* (x, t)$ in the above equation. As in the classical wave case above, the quantum interference term can add (constructive interference) or subtract (destructive interference) from $|\Psi_A (x, t)|^2 + |\Psi_B (x, t)|^2$ in the above equation depending on whether the quantum interference term is positive or negative. If this term is absent for all $x$, then there is no quantum mechanical interference associated with situations A and B.

The best known example of quantum interference is the double-slit experiment. In this experiment, matter waves from electrons, atoms or molecules approach a barrier with two slits in it. The part of the wavefunction going through one slit is associated with $\Psi_A (x, t)$ while the part going through the other slit is associated with $\Psi_B (x, t)$. The interference pattern occurs on the far side, observed by detectors suitable to the particles originating the matter wave. The pattern matches the optical double slit pattern.

== Applications ==
=== Beat ===
In acoustics, a beat is an interference pattern between two sounds of slightly different frequencies, perceived as a periodic variation in volume whose rate is the difference of the two frequencies.

With tuning instruments that can produce sustained tones, beats can be readily recognized. Tuning two tones to a unison will present a peculiar effect: when the two tones are close in pitch but not identical, the difference in frequency generates the beating. The volume varies like in a tremolo as the sounds alternately interfere constructively and destructively. As the two tones gradually approach unison, the beating slows down and may become so slow as to be imperceptible. As the two tones get further apart, their beat frequency starts to approach the range of human pitch perception, the beating starts to sound like a note, and a combination tone is produced. This combination tone can also be referred to as a missing fundamental, as the beat frequency of any two tones is equivalent to the frequency of their implied fundamental frequency.

=== Interferometry ===
Interferometry is an experimental technique for measuring or using interference. It can be used with many types of waves. All interferometers require a source of coherent waves.

==== Optical interferometry ====
The simplest interferometer has a pinhole to create a coherent source followed by a mask with two holes and a screen to observe the interference. This gives the double-slit experiment. Modern versions replace the initial pinhole with the coherent light of a laser. Other wave-front splitting interferometers use mirror or prisms to split and recombine waves; amplitude splitting devices use thin dielectric films. Multiple beam interferometers can include lenses.

The results of the Michelson–Morley experiment are generally considered to be the first strong evidence against the theory of a luminiferous aether and in favor of special relativity.

Interferometry has been used in defining and calibrating length standards. When the metre was defined as the distance between two marks on a platinum-iridium bar, Michelson and Benoît used interferometry to measure the wavelength of the red cadmium line in the new standard, and also showed that it could be used as a length standard. Sixty years later, in 1960, the metre in the new SI system was defined to be equal to 1,650,763.73 wavelengths of the orange-red emission line in the electromagnetic spectrum of the krypton-86 atom in a vacuum. This definition was replaced in 1983 by defining the metre as the distance travelled by light in vacuum during a specific time interval. Interferometry is still fundamental in establishing the calibration chain in length measurement.

Interferometry is used in the calibration of slip gauges (called gauge blocks in the US) and in coordinate-measuring machines. It is also used in the testing of optical components.

==== Radio interferometry ====
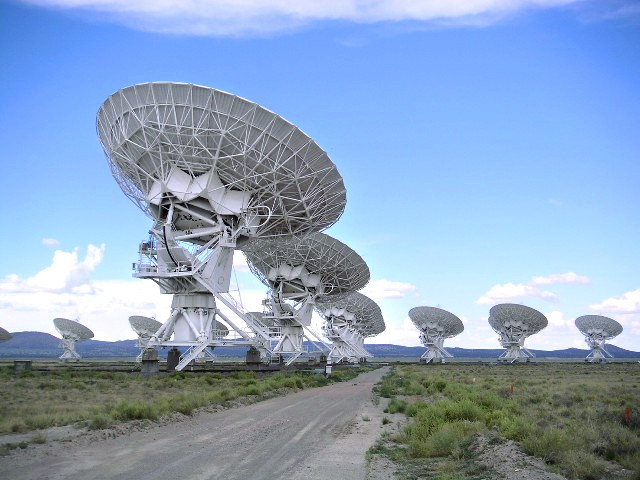
The Very Large Array, an interferometric array formed from many smaller telescopes, like many larger radio telescopes.

In 1946, a technique called astronomical interferometry was developed. Astronomical radio interferometers usually consist either of arrays of parabolic dishes or two-dimensional arrays of omni-directional antennas. All of the telescopes in the array are widely separated and are usually connected together using coaxial cable, waveguide, optical fiber, or other type of transmission line. Interferometry increases the total signal collected, but its primary purpose is to vastly increase the resolution through a process called Aperture synthesis. This technique works by superposing (interfering) the signal waves from the different telescopes on the principle that waves that coincide with the same phase will add to each other while two waves that have opposite phases will cancel each other out. This creates a combined telescope that is equivalent in resolution (though not in sensitivity) to a single antenna whose diameter is equal to the spacing of the antennas farthest apart in the array.

==== Acoustic interferometry ====
An acoustic interferometer is an instrument for measuring the physical characteristics of sound waves in a gas or liquid, such as velocity, wavelength, absorption, or impedance. A vibrating crystal creates ultrasonic waves that are radiated into the medium. The waves strike a reflector placed parallel to the crystal, reflected back to the source and measured.

== See also ==
- Active noise control
- Beat (acoustics)
- Coherence (physics)
- Diffraction
- Haidinger fringes
- Interference lithography
- Interference visibility
- Interferometer
- Lloyd's Mirror
- Moiré pattern
- Multipath interference
- Newton's rings
- Optical path length
- Thin-film interference
- Rayleigh roughness criterion
- Upfade
