= Sensory deprivation =

Deliberate reduction or removal of stimuli

Sensory deprivation or perceptual isolation is the deliberate reduction or removal of stimuli from one or more of the senses. Simple devices such as blindfolds or hoods and earmuffs can cut off sight and hearing, while more complex devices can also cut off the sense of smell, touch, taste, thermoception (heat-sense), and the ability to know which way is down. Sensory deprivation has been used in various alternative medicines and in psychological experiments (e.g. with an isolation tank). When deprived of sensation, the brain attempts to restore sensation in the form of hallucinations.

Short-term sessions of sensory deprivation are described as relaxing and conducive to meditation; however, extended or forced sensory deprivation can result in extreme anxiety, hallucinations, bizarre thoughts, and depression.

A related phenomenon is perceptual deprivation, also called the Ganzfeld effect. In this case a constant uniform stimulus is used instead of attempting to remove the stimuli; this leads to effects which have similarities to sensory deprivation.

Sensory deprivation techniques were developed by some of the armed forces within NATO, as a means of interrogating prisoners within international treaty obligations. The European Court of Human Rights ruled that the use of the five techniques by British security forces in Northern Ireland amounted to a practice of inhuman and degrading treatment. It was also used in prisons such as Guantanamo.

== Restricted environmental stimulation therapy (REST) ==
There are two main basic methods of restricted environmental stimulation therapy (REST): chamber REST and flotation REST.

=== Chamber REST ===
In chamber REST, the subject lies on a bed in a completely dark and sound-reducing (on average, 80 dB) room for up to 24 hours. Their movement is restricted by the experimental instructions, but not by any mechanical restraints. Food, drink, and toilet facilities are provided in the room and are at the discretion of the tester, who can communicate with the participants using an open intercom. Subjects are allowed to leave the room before the 24 hours are complete; however, fewer than 10% actually do because they find the chamber so relaxing. Chamber REST affects psychological functioning (thinking, perception, memory, motivation, and mood) and psychophysiological processes.

=== Flotation REST ===
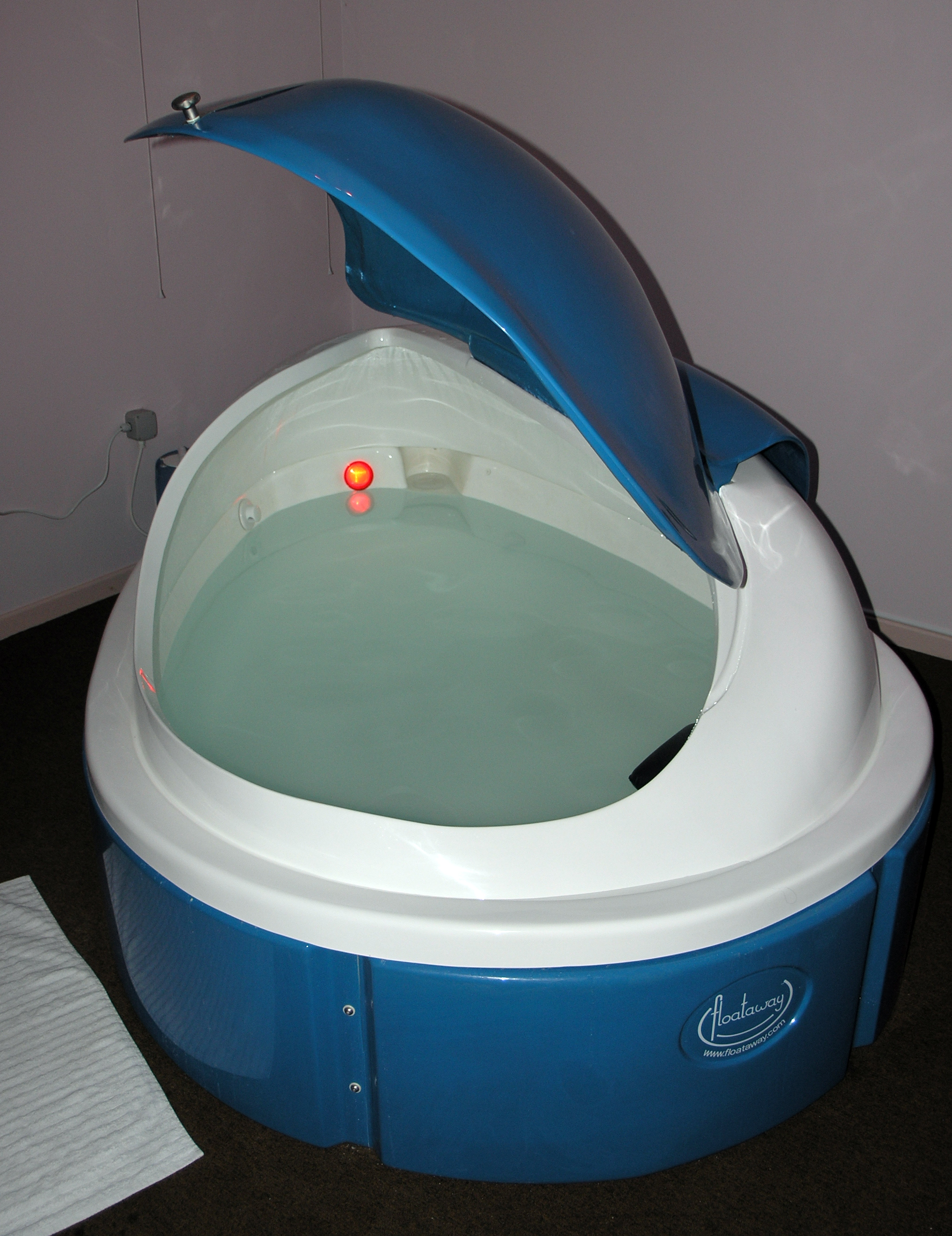
Flotation tank with flip top lid opened

In flotation REST, the room contains a tank or pool (commonly known as an isolation tank or sensory deprivation tank). The flotation medium consists of a skin-temperature solution of water and Epsom salts at a specific gravity that allows for the patient to float supine without the worry of safety. In fact, to turn over while in the solution requires "major deliberate effort." Fewer than 5% of the subjects tested leave before the session duration ends, which is usually around an hour for flotation REST.

Spas sometimes provide commercial float tanks for use in relaxation. Flotation therapy has been academically studied in the US and in Sweden with published results showing reductions of both pain and stress. The relaxed state also involves lowered blood pressure, lowered levels of cortisol, and maximal blood flow. Besides physiological effects, REST seems to have positive effects on well-being and performance.

=== Chamber versus flotation REST ===
Several differences exist between flotation and chamber REST. For example, with the presence of a medium in flotation REST, the subject has reduced tactile stimulation while experiencing weightlessness. The addition of Epsom salts to attain the desired specific gravity may have a therapeutic effect on hypertonic muscles. Since one of the main results of chamber REST is a state of relaxation, the effects of chamber REST on arousal are less clear-cut, which can be attributed to the nature of the solution.

Also, due to the inherent immobilization that is experienced in flotation REST (by not being able to roll over), which can become uncomfortable after several hours, the subject is unable to experience the session durations of chamber REST. This may not allow the subject to experience the changes in attitudes and thinking that are associated with chamber REST. Additionally, the research questions asked between each technique are different. Chamber REST questions stemmed from research that began in the 1950s and explored a variety of questions about the need for stimulation, the nature of arousal and its relationship with external stimulation. Practitioners in this area have explored its utility in the treatment of major psychiatric dysfunctions such as substance abuse. In contrast, flotation REST was seen more as a recreational tool and was tested primarily for use with stress-related disorders, pain reduction, and insomnia.

Numerous studies have debated which method is a more effective treatment process; however, only one has explored this statistically. Nineteen subjects, all of whom used chamber or flotation REST to induce relaxation or treat smoking, obesity, alcohol intake or chronic pain were analyzed. The statistic of interest, d, is a measure of the size of the treatment effect. For reference, d=0.5 is considered a moderate effect and d=0.8 a large effect. The 19 subjects who underwent chamber REST had d=0.53 and six flotation REST subjects showed d=0.33. Additionally, when examining subjects undergoing REST treatment and REST in conjunction with another treatment method, there was little difference. However, Flotation REST has the advantage of a lower duration required (45 minutes as opposed to 24 hours).

== Neurobiological impacts ==
=== Brain Structure and Function ===
Sensory deprivation results in multiple neurobiological changes to both brain structure and neurotransmitter function. Voluntariness and duration are critical in determining whether sensory deprivation will result in positive or negative impacts on neurobiological function. When occurring involuntarily or in extended durations, changes from sensory deprivation are described in relation to potential vulnerabilities for mental illnesses and cognitive impairments, especially regarding changes to the hippocampus. When occurring in short sessions and voluntarily, sensory deprivation is shown to positively impact neurobiological changes and reduce negative physiological symptoms, as seen with REST therapies.

=== Brain plasticity ===
Neural plasticity allows the brain to adapt, changing the structure and/or function of the parts of the brain. When the brain lacks stimuli, neuroplasticity allows the brain to restructure the segments lacking stimulation to contribute to the areas still receiving stimulation. This is seen more commonly with audition and visual sensations. When auditory senses are impaired, the brain structure changes to allow the previously unused cortical area to now serve the visual cortex (or vice versa). When one sense is impaired, the brain's plasticity allows the cortical areas from that sense to restructure themselves to serve the working sense instead, known as cross-modal plasticity. Alternatively, an extended lack of social and environmental stimuli can lead to neuroplasticity in a reductive way. This form of neuroplasticity results in a reduction of grey matter volume within the brain and can impact cognitive functioning. Recovery of lost cognitive processes is possible to a partial degree, and sleep quality can act as a protective factor.

=== Physiological effects ===
- information for this section will be added soon

==== Low-arousal positive affects (LAPA) ====
- information for this section will be added soon

=== Psychedelic effects ===
Studies have been conducted to test the effect of sensory deprivation on the brain. One study took 19 volunteers, all of whom tested in the lower and upper 20th percentiles on a questionnaire that measures the tendency of healthy people to see things not really there, and placed them in a pitch-black, soundproof booth for 15 minutes, after which they completed another test that measures psychosis-like experiences, originally used to study recreational drug users. Five subjects reported seeing hallucinations of faces; six reported seeing shapes/faces not actually there; four noted a heightened sense of smell, and two reported sensing a "presence of evil" in the room. People who scored lower on the first test experienced fewer perceptual distortions; however, they still reported seeing a variety of hallucinations. Many studies have been conducted to understand the main causes of the hallucinations, and considerable evidence has been accumulated indicating that long periods of isolation aren't directly related to the level of experienced hallucinations.

Schizophrenics appear to tend to experience fewer hallucinations while in REST as compared to non-psychotic individuals. A possible explanation for this could be that non-psychotic individuals are normally exposed to a greater degree of sensory stimulation in everyday life, and in REST, the brain attempts to re-create a similar level of stimulation, producing the hallucinatory events. According to a 2009 study published in the Journal of Nervous and Mental Disease, the hallucinations are caused by the brain misidentifying the source of what it is currently experiencing, a phenomenon called faulty source monitoring. A study conducted on individuals who underwent REST while under the effects of Phencyclidine (PCP) showed a lower incidence of hallucination in comparison to participants who did not take PCP. The effects of PCP also appeared to be reduced while undergoing REST. The effects PCP has on reducing occurrences of hallucinatory events provide a potential insight into the mechanisms behind these events.

== Other therapies and uses ==
=== Substance use treatments ===
The use of REST has been explored in aiding in the cessation of smoking. In studies ranging between 12 months and five years, 25% of REST patients achieved long-term abstinence. REST, when combined with other effective smoking cessation methods (for example: behavior modification) resulted in long-term abstinence of 50%. Also, when combined with weekly support groups, REST resulted in 80% of patients achieving long-term abstinence. Comparatively, the use of a nicotine patch alone has a success rate of 5%.

Alcoholism has also been the target of research associated with REST. In conjunction with anti-alcohol educational messages, patients who underwent two hours of REST treatment reduced alcohol consumption by 56% in the first two weeks after treatment. The reduction in consumption was maintained during follow-ups conducted three and six months after the first treatment. It is, however, possible that this is caused by the placebo effect.

In addition, REST has been tested to determine its effect on users of other drugs. A University of Arizona study used chamber REST as a complement to traditional outpatient substance abuse treatment and found that four years later, 43% of the patients were still sober and drug-free. Eight months later, no one in the control group remained clean.

=== Psychosocial interventions and sensory deprivation ===
- information for this section will be added soon

=== Medical interventions: Seizures and concussions ===
- information for this section will be added soon

=== Interrogation ===
Sensory deprivation has been used to disorientate subjects during interrogation, brainwashing, and torture. In particular, the five techniques of wall-standing; hooding; subjection to noise; deprivation of sleep; deprivation of food and drink were used by the security forces in Northern Ireland in the early 1970s. After the Parker Report of 1972, these techniques were formally abandoned by the United Kingdom as aids to the interrogation of paramilitary suspects.

The Irish government on behalf of the men who had been subject to the five methods took a case to the European Commission of Human Rights (Ireland v. United Kingdom, 1976 Y.B. Eur. Conv. on Hum. Rts. 512, 748, 788–94 (European Commission of Human Rights)). The Commission stated that it "considered the combined use of the five methods to amount to torture." This consideration was overturned on appeal, when in 1978 the European Court of Human Rights (ECtHR) examined the United Nations' definition of torture. The court subsequently ruled that the five techniques "did not occasion suffering of the particular intensity and cruelty implied by the word torture," however they did amount "to a practice of inhuman and degrading treatment," which is a breach of the European Convention on Human Rights, Article 3.

In their judgment the court states that:

These methods, sometimes termed "disorientation" or "sensory deprivation" techniques, were not used in any cases other than the fourteen so indicated above. It emerges from the Commission's establishment of the facts that the techniques consisted of:

- wall-standing: forcing the detainees to remain for periods of some hours in a stress position, described by those who underwent it as being "spreadeagled against the wall, with their fingers put high above the head against the wall, the legs spread apart and the feet back, causing them to stand on their toes with the weight of the body mainly on the fingers";
- hooding: putting a black or navy colored bag over the detainees' heads and, at least initially, keeping it there all the time except during interrogation;
- subjection to noise: pending their interrogations, holding the detainees in a room where there was a continuous loud and hissing noise;
- deprivation of sleep: pending their interrogations, depriving the detainees of sleep
- deprivation of food and drink: subjecting the detainees to a reduced diet during their stay at the center and pending interrogation

== Philosophical, religious, and historical applications ==
=== Philosophical applications of sensory deprivation ===
Sensory deprivation has been used to help support arguments by philosophers on how minds work. One example is the floating man argument proposed by Ibn Sīnā, whose primary objective is to affirm the existence of the human soul.

==== Floating man argument ====
Ibn Sīnā, one of the most important philosophers of the medieval period, investigated the existence of the self and explored the self's nature. Like many others, he proposed an argument to support his claim regarding the relationship between the mind and the body. He based his investigation on the Floating Man argument where, he proposes, a man floating in the air or a vacuum where he cannot perceive anything, not even the substance of air. This man is unable to see anything external; his arms and legs are separated from the rest of his body; they do not meet or touch. In other words, the man is experiencing extreme sensory deprivation in order to separate what physical body and any perception of stimuli that a person can experience from what consciousness might be in Ibn Sīnā's thought experiment. The man later reflects on his existence. He will not question that he exists, but he will not be able to affirm if his legs, arms, or internal organs exist. He guarantees that his essence exists, but he will not have awareness of the length or depth of himself. Therefore, in the thought experiment, what the man can affirm to exist is the man's self and what he cannot affirm does not make part of his essence, like an arm or a toe. The argument concludes then that since the man can affirm his existence while being subjected to extreme sensory deprivation, his soul is something different from his physical body. His soul is then said to be an immaterial substance separate from his body. This is considered a dualist argument in the philosophy of mind as it separates the mind from the body to affirm the existence of oneself.

=== Religious applications of sensory deprivation ===
- information for this section will be added soon

==== The Cave of Laughlessness ====
- information for this section will be added soon

==== Tibetan Buddhist practices ====
- information for this section will be added soon

=== Historical applications of sensory deprivation ===
- information for this section will be added soon

==== Cold war and brainwashing scares ====
Early Cold War fears of Soviet and Chinese "brainwashing" prompted government-funded research into sensory deprivation. In 1951, after a secret meeting on brainwashing in Montreal attended by Canadian, American and British officials, Canada's Defence Research Board funded Donald O. Hebb's isolation experiments at McGill University. Student volunteers wore translucent goggles and arm tubing while lying in a cubicle with a constant masking noise. They reported hallucinations, impaired thinking and increased susceptibility to persuasion. The board later funded John Zubek's isolation laboratory at the University of Manitoba from 1959 to 1974.

In 1972, the British inquiry into the use of the five techniques on internees in Northern Ireland weighed evidence from experiments on student volunteers. Lord Gardiner's minority report noted "a considerable bibliography of experiments in this field, particularly in Canada".

== See also ==
- Visual release hallucinations
- Musical ear syndrome
- Altered States (film)
- Apophenia
- Dark retreat
- Enhanced interrogation techniques
- Human experimentation in the United States
- Isolation to facilitate abuse
- Johnny Got His Gun
- John C. Lilly
- Prisoner's cinema
- Sensory overload
- THX 1138
- Mind-body dualism

== General and cited references ==
- P. Solomon et al. (eds.) (1961). Sensory deprivation. Harvard University Press.
- Marvin Zuckerman, Nathan Cohen (1964). "Sources of Reports of Visual Auditory Sensations in perceptual-isolation experiments". Psychological Bulletin, July 1964, 62, pp. 1–20.
- L. Goldberger (1966). "Experimental isolation: An overview". American Journal of Psychiatry 122, 774–782.
- J. Zubek (ed.) (1969). Sensory deprivation: Fifteen years of research. Appleton Century Crofts.
- European Court of Human Rights (1978). Ireland v. the United Kingdom – January 18, 1978.
- Dirk van Dierendonck & Jan te Nijenhuis (2005). "Flotation restricted environmental stimulation therapy (REST) as a stress-management tool: A meta-analysis". Psychology and Health, June 2005, 20(3), pp. 405–412.
- P. R. Corlett, C. D. Frith, P. C. Fletcher (2009). "From drugs to deprivation: a Bayesian framework for understanding models of psychosis". Psychopharmacology, November 2009, 206(4), pp. 515–530.
