= Dark retreat =

Tibetan Buddhism advanced practice

Dark retreat (Wylie: mun mtshams) is a spiritual retreat in a space that is completely absent of light, which is an advanced practice of Tibetan Buddhism and Bön.

== Overview ==
The dark retreat environment of the Bon religion is particularly conducive to the practice of certain visionary yogas (such as the “six-limbed yoga” of Kalacakra and the Dzogchen practice of Thögal for the attainment of the Rainbow Body), which according to Hatchell are "techniques that lead to the experience of spontaneously arising visual experiences, which are said to occur without deliberate effort or conceptual imagination, and which appear before the practitioner’s eyes."

According Hatchell, the Kalacakra system's six yogas:

instruct the yogi to spend lengthy periods either gazing at the blank sky or residing in a dark room specially prepared to seal out all light. Both of these are forms of sensory deprivation and result in a series of unstructured appearances of light—like sparks, fireflies, and so forth—that ultimately coalesce into a vision of deities, or the appearance of a luminous goddess known as the Great Seal (mahamudra, phyag rgya chen mo).

Regarding the Dzogchen tradition of visionary practice, Hatchell writes:

While the Great Perfection contains a diversity of visionary yogas, their basic format bears many similarities to Kalacakra’s six yogas: an organizing theme of dark and light, the use of dark-retreat and sky-gazing, a sequence of visions that progresses from unstructured spots of light to encounters with fully formed deities, and a tendency to use these visions as the basis for philosophical discussion.

Hatchell notes that there are major differences between the Kalachakra and Dzogchen system, including different "preliminary practices that prepare the yogi for vision" and "the details and sequences of the main practices" are also different. Also, Dzogchen "presents a unique system of luminous energy channels that traverse the body’s interior and give rise to vision, a feature that is absent in Kalacakra."

The dark retreat practice is discussed in the various Kalachakra works, such as the Stainless Light Commentary. It is also discussed in the Dzogchen tantra titled Tantra of the Blazing Lamps (sgron ma 'bar ba’i rgyud), one of the Seventeen Tantras. Similar practices are also discussed in the Advice on the Six Lamps and its commentary by Drugom Gyalwa Yungdrung, which are part of Bon religion.

The time period dedicated to dark retreat varies from a few hours to decades. Dark retreat in the Himalayan tradition is a restricted practice only to be engaged by the senior spiritual practitioner under appropriate spiritual guidance. This practice is considered conducive for navigating the bardo at the time of death and for realizing the rainbow body.

The traditional dark retreat requires stability in the natural state and is only suitable for advanced practitioners. Ayu Khandro and Dilgo Khyentse are examples of modern, if not contemporary, practitioners of significant periods of dark retreat sadhana. Ayu Khandro performed the Yang-Ti (Tibetan), an advanced practice of the Dzogchen Upadesha, a version of the Dark Retreat.

== See also ==
- Ganzfeld effect – Psychological phenomenon
- Isolation tank – Pitch-black, light-proof, soundproof environment heated to the same temperature as the skin
- Kogi people – Indigenous Chibchan ethnic group of northern Colombia
- Personal identity – Philosophical idea of a person having a unique existence
- Phosphene – Visual illusion
- Prisoner's cinema – Visual phenomenon involving seeing animated lights in the darkness
- Retreat (spiritual) – Period spent in reflection or solitude
- Sky gazing (Dzogchen) – Tibetan Buddhist practice
- Tibetan tantric practice – Tantric practices in Tibetan Buddhism
