= Mind Science Foundation =

Nonprofit organization in San Antonio, United States

The Mind Science Foundation (MSF) is a private non-profit scientific foundation in San Antonio, Texas, USA, established by the philanthropist Thomas Baker Slick in 1958.

The Foundation's mission is to raise awareness and levels of funding for one of the major unsolved questions in science: how consciousness arises in human beings.

== Awards and sponsorship of research ==
MSF is a principal, international supporter of pilot data grants for consciousness research. Some recent award recipients include:

- Fred Gage – Salk Institute for Biological Studies
- Susan Greenfield – Oxford University
- Christof Koch – California Institute of Technology
- V.S. Ramachandran – University of California San Diego

== Lecture events ==
In addition to funding leading researchers in the field, the Mind Science Foundation hosts a Distinguished Speakers Series to heighten public awareness of practical topics related to human consciousness. Examples of past speakers include:

- Jonas Salk – inaugural speaker, Distinguished Speakers Series
- Steven Laureys – University of Liege, Belgium
- J. Allan Hobson - Harvard Medical School
- Kay Redfield Jamison Johns Hopkins University School of Medicine
- Temple Grandin – Colorado State University
- Jane Goodall – Goodall Institute

== Sponsoring events ==
The Foundation also supports international symposia and conferences focused on the scientific study of consciousness and has also helped to sponsor events with the following organizations:

- Association for the Scientific Study of Consciousness
  - ASSC-8 Satellite meeting (Antwerp, 2004): "Coma and Impaired Consciousness"
  - ASSC-9 (Caltech, 2005)
  - ASSC-10 (Oxford, 2006)
- Mind and Life Institute
  - Public Meeting with the Dalai Lama (M.I.T., 2003)
  - Public Meeting with the Dalai Lama (Washington, D. C., 2005)

== See also ==
- Association for the Scientific Study of Consciousness
