= Prisoner's cinema =

Visual phenomenon involving seeing animated lights in the darkness

Prisoner's cinema is the phenomenon of a "light show" of various colors that appear out of the darkness. The light has a form, but those that have seen it find it difficult to describe. Sometimes, the cinema lights resolve into human or other figures.

The phenomenon is reported by prisoners confined to dark cells and by others kept in darkness, voluntarily or not, for long periods of time. It has also been reported by truck drivers, pilots, and practitioners of intense meditation. Astronauts and other individuals who have been exposed to certain types of radiation have reported witnessing similar phenomena.

Scientists believe that the cinema is a result of phosphenes combined with the psychological effects of prolonged lack of exposure to light, and others have noted a connection between the form the lights take and paleolithic cave paintings.

== Popular culture ==
The pilot episode for the original Twilight Zone series, "Where Is Everybody?," depicts elaborate, fully realistic hallucinations by a test subject undergoing prolonged isolation and sensory deprivation as part of research into human space travel.

Melvin Moti produced a short film The Prisoner's Cinema based upon a scientist's description of visions from several days of sensory deprivation.

== See also ==
- Charles Bonnet syndrome
- Closed-eye hallucination
- Dreaming
- Dark retreat
- Eigengrau
- Ganzfeld effect
- Hypnagogia
- Isolation tank
- Phosphene
- Sensory deprivation
