= Isolation tank =

Sensory deprivation tank

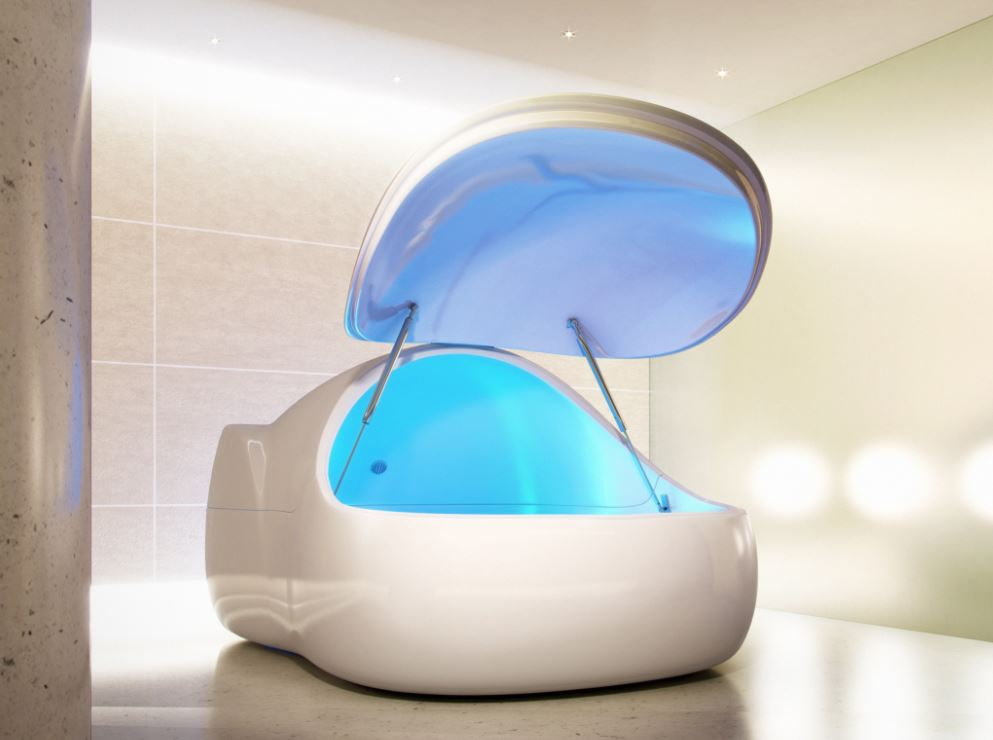
Example of a float tank using a pod design

An isolation tank, sensory deprivation tank, float tank, float pod, float cabin, flotation tank, or sensory attenuation tank is a water filled, pitch-black, light-proof, soundproof environment heated to the same temperature as the skin.

== Method ==
The tank is filled with 25 centimeters (10 in) of water which contains enough dissolved Epsom salt to create a specific gravity of approximately 1.25–1.26, enabling a person to float freely with their face above the water. In order to reduce thermal sensations, the water in the float tank is maintained at approximately skin temperature, around 35 °C. One typically floats without clothing to minimize tactile sensations, and earplugs are worn during floating both to minimize auditory sensations and to keep Epsom salt out of the ear canal.

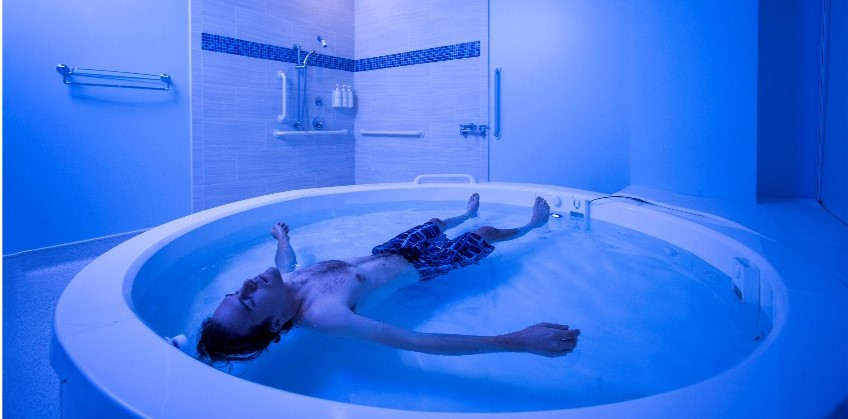
An open fiberglass float pool at the Laureate Institute for Brain Research in Tulsa, Oklahoma, USA allows subjects with clinical anxiety to float comfortably, without the apprehension one might encounter in an enclosed float environment.

Several different tank designs exist. Pod and cabin designs utilize enclosures with doors to enter or exit the tank, whereas pool designs are built from circular fiberglass and lack an enclosure to reduce the risk of claustrophobia. The pool design is housed in a room that is soundproof and lightproof, with tightly controlled ambient air temperature and humidity.

== History ==
The isolation tank was developed in 1954 by John C. Lilly, a medical practitioner and neuropsychiatrist. During his training in psychoanalysis at the US National Institute of Mental Health (NIMH), Lilly experimented with sensory deprivation.

Widespread commercial interest and use of the isolation tank did not occur until 1972, when Glenn Perry, a computer systems programmer, began selling the first commercial tanks after he attended a five-day workshop by Lilly.

In 1981, there were about $4 million in sales and rentals in the industry, and expectations were that the market would grow, spurred by the film Altered States (a film starring William Hurt as a psychopathologist experimenting with a flotation tank), which came out in 1980. According to one source in the industry, in the 1980s the rise of AIDS and the fear of shared water reduced demand for flotation centers. By 2013, flotation was more popular in Europe than the US, but had undergone some growth in the area around San Francisco; at that time a low-end tank cost about $10,000, and an hour-long flotation session cost about $70.

== Alternative medicine ==
Use of the float tank has roots in alternative medicine, where its use and promotion occurred largely outside of a scientific framework. Early scientific research on the use of float tanks was stalled by "political activists [who] viewed sensory deprivation as analogous to solitary confinement and torture", thus leading to "hostile publications in the popular media and in professional journals [and] to actual physical violence against researchers."

Flotation has been widely advertised as a form of alternative medicine that has a number of health benefits, but the claims are often exaggerated and poorly evidenced. Despite the lack of scientific support, people have sought treatment from flotation for many conditions including muscle tension, chronic pain, hypertension, and rheumatoid arthritis to PMS.

== Research ==
A 2005 meta-analysis of clinical trials that had been conducted at that time, found that the trials were generally small and highly prone to error, but given that limitation, use of isolation tanks, (called "flotation REST" or "restricted environmental stimulation therapy" in the literature) shows a large effect size (Cohen's d = 1.02) for stress reduction. A 2018 review described flotation-REST as one of "[s]everal emerging technologies [which] may have relevance for interoception and mental health" as it "appears to noninvasively enhance exposure to interoceptive sensations such as the breath and heartbeat".

== Flotation-REST ==
Scientific research with float tank therapy generally uses the term "flotation-REST" (reduced environmental stimulation therapy) to refer to the technique. This term is preferred over "sensory deprivation" due to the fact that 1) the float tank experience actually enhanced sensory input from the body (e.g., cardiorespiratory sensations) and can also be conceptualized as a form of sensory enhancement and 2) the term "sensory deprivation" carries negative connotations of torture and hallucinations that have likely impeded legitimate research in this field.

== Notable users ==
- Aaron Traywick, an American businessman and life extension activist, drowned in an isolation tank in 2018. An autopsy found evidence of Ketamine in his system.
- Carl Lawson, football player for the Dallas Cowboys, and formerly the New York Jets and Cincinnati Bengals, uses the tank for muscle recovery and visual training.
- Carl Lewis, track and field athlete, used in-tank visualization techniques to prepare himself for his gold medal long jump at the 1988 Seoul Olympics.
- During Super Bowl XLIX, both NFL teams (the New England Patriots and Seattle Seahawks) rented out a local float spa during the week of the event. One team would float in the morning and the other would float in the afternoon.
- Christof Koch, a neuroscientist known for his work on consciousness, states that he had "what some people call a mystical experience" in a float tank in Singapore.
- Joe Rogan has stated in his podcast on numerous occasions that he owns an isolation tank and credits it for allowing a state of deeper meditation.
- John Lennon treated his heroin addiction in 1979 with the help of 90-minute floats in a cedar-wood box.
- Marvin Jones, wide receiver for the Jacksonville Jaguars and formerly of the Cincinnati Bengals and Detroit Lions, began using flotation therapy to help him in his recovery from an ankle injury while in Cincinnati.
- Phil Lester visited a flotation center for a YouTube video on his channel "AmazingPhil" on February 17, 2020.
- Richard Feynman, Nobel Prize-winning physicist, discussed his experiences with isolation tanks in Surely You're Joking, Mr. Feynman!
- Several NFL teams, including the New England Patriots, Los Angeles Rams, and New Orleans Saints reportedly use floating as a way to increase players' quality of sleep as well as help with recovery.
- In 2015 two-time NBA MVP Stephen Curry reportedly used a sensory-deprivation tank every two weeks.

== See also ==
- Dark retreat
- Mindfulness
- Prisoner's cinema
- Psychedelic experience
- Sleep pod
