= Audio therapy =

Holistic approach to well-being

Audio therapy is the clinical use of recorded sound, music, or spoken words, or a combination thereof, recorded on a physical medium such as a compact disc (CD), or a digital file, including those formatted as MP3, which patients or participants play on a suitable device, and to which they listen with intent to experience a subsequent beneficial physiological, psychological, or social effect.

== Synthesis of multiple disciplines ==
Audio therapy synthesises elements from a number of discrete areas of research and practice, including receptive music therapy, bibliotherapy, creative visualization, guided imagery, guided meditation, sound healing, and cognitive behavioral therapy.

=== Receptive music therapy ===
The term "receptive music therapy" denotes a process by which patients or participants listen to music with specific intent to therapeutically benefit; and is a term used by therapists to distinguish it from "active music therapy" by which patients or participants engage in producing vocal or instrumental music.

Receptive music therapy is an effective adjunctive intervention suitable for treating a range of physical and mental conditions.

Audio therapy inherits from receptive music therapy the process by which listening to sound benefits a listener, but departs from it in three significant ways.

Firstly, whilst receptive music therapy provides musical sound, to which the patient or participant listens, audio therapy also uses other kinds of acoustic content, including the spoken word and ambient noise.

Secondly, practitioners of receptive music therapy allege that its effective application requires the presence of a therapist, emphasizing the relationship between the client and the therapist, between the client and the music, and between the client and therapist interacting with the music. In contrast and by distinction, audio therapy is provided as a self-service modality, through which the listener is purported to experience a therapeutic benefit in consequence to listening, without input or guidance form a third party.

Thirdly, whilst receptive music therapy may provide live as well as recorded music, to which the patient or participant listens, audio therapy is always provided via a sound recording.

=== Bibliotherapy ===
Bibliotherapy is the process by which a patient or participant reads fiction, poetry, and other creative with intent to experience a therapeutic outcome that manifests most commonly as the relief of psychological pain or mental distress as well as an increased introspective insight into himself or herself.

Bibliotherapy is often situated in a context where it is one of multiple interventions, and is usually grounded in a specific psychotherapeutic or psychological discipline. One such discipline is cognitive behavioral therapy. Unlike music therapy, but similar to audio therapy, the most important aspect of cognitive bibliotherapy is the content of the recording, and not the individual interactions with a therapist.

Audio therapy imports the principles of bibliotherapy but provides the content on a recorded media, making therapeutic use of audiobooks

=== Creative visualization ===
Creative visualization is the cognitive process of purposefully generating visual mental imagery, with eyes open or closed, simulating or recreating visual perception, in order to maintain, inspect, and transform those images, consequently modifying their associated emotions or feelings, with intent to experience a subsequent beneficial physiological, psychological, or social effect, such as expediting the healing of wounds to the body, minimizing physical pain, alleviating psychological pain including anxiety, sadness, and low mood, improving self-esteem or self-confidence, and enhancing the capacity to cope when interacting with others.

Creative visualization can be facilitated in person by a teacher or practitioner, or provided on recorded media. Whether provided in person, or delivered via media, as it is in audio therapy the verbal instruction consists of words, often pre-scripted, intended to direct the participant's attention to intentionally generated visual mental images that precipitate a positive psychologic and physiologic response, incorporating increased mental and physical relaxation and decreased mental and physical stress.

=== Guided imagery ===
Guided imagery is a mind-body intervention by which a trained practitioner or teacher helps a participant or patient to evoke and generate mental images that simulate or re-create the sensory perception of sights, sounds, tastes, smells, movements, and images associated with touch, such as texture, temperature, and pressure, as well as imaginative or mental content that the participant or patient experiences as defying conventional sensory categories, and that may precipitate strong emotions or feelings. in the absence of the stimuli to which correlating sensory receptors are receptive.

The practitioner or teacher may facilitate this process in person to an individual or a group. Alternatively, the participant or patient may follow guidance provided by a recording of spoken instruction that may be accompanied by music or sound, as it is in audio therapy.

=== Guided meditation ===
Guided meditation is a process by which one or more participants meditate in response to the guidance provided by a trained practitioner or teacher, either in person or via a written text, sound recording, video, or audiovisual media comprising music or verbal instruction, or a combination of both.

Audio therapy facilitates guided meditation for therapeutic benefit through the provision of recordings.

The term "guided meditation" is most commonly used in clinical practice, scholarly research, and scientific investigation to signify an aggregate of integrated techniques. The most common and frequently used combination or synthesis comprises meditation music and receptive music therapy, guided imagery, relaxation, some form of meditative practice, and journaling. Less commonly, hypnosis, or hypnotherapeutic procedures are included as part of the multifaceted intervention denoted by the term "guided meditation".

=== Cognitive behavioral therapy ===
Cognitive behavioral therapy (CBT) is a form of psychotherapy that can be delivered effectively to a range of patients through the provision of audio recordings, as it is in audio therapy, which provide the patient with instruction pertaining to the management of thoughts, feelings, and behaviors.

== Hypotheses ==
Audio therapy is predicated on the hypothesis that attentively listening to recorded sound, such as music, spoken words, or ambient noise, affects thoughts and feelings, which in turn affects brain electrochemistry and body physiology. It may therefore be considered as a mind-body intervention, as defined by the National Center for Complementary and Integrative Health (NCCIH). The NCCIH defines mind–body interventions as those practices that "employ a variety of techniques designed to facilitate the mind's capacity to affect bodily function and symptoms", and include guided imagery, guided meditation and forms of meditative activity, hypnosis and hypnotherapy, prayer, as well as art therapy, music therapy, and dance therapy.

Although the means by which the mind affects the body is largely unknown, it is explained to a significant degree by psychoneuroimmunology.

The term "psychoneuroimmunology" was coined by the American psychologist Robert Ader in 1981 to describe the study of interactions between psychological, neurological, and immune systems.

The fundamental hypothesis of psychoneuroimmunology is concisely that the way people think and how they feel directly influences the electrochemistry of the brain and central nervous system, which in turn has a significant influence on the immune system and its capacity to defend the body against disease infection, and ill health. Meanwhile, the immune system affects brain chemistry and its electrical activity, which in turn has a considerable effect on the way we think and feel.

Because of this interplay, a person's negative thoughts, feelings, and perceptions, such as pessimistic predictions about the future, regretful ruminations upon the past, low self-esteem, and depleted belief in self-determination and a capacity to cope can undermine the efficiency of the immune system, increasing vulnerability to ill health. Simultaneously, the biochemical indicators of ill health monitored by the immune system feeds back to the brain via the nervous system, which exacerbates thoughts and feelings of a negative nature. That is to say, we feel and think of ourselves as unwell, which contributes to physical conditions of ill health, which in turn cause us to feel and think of ourselves as unwell.

However, the interplay between cognitive and emotional, neurological, and immunological processes also provides for the possibility of positively influencing the body and enhancing physical health by changing the way we think and feel. For example, people who are able to deconstruct the cognitive distortions that precipitate perpetual pessimism and hopelessness and further develop the capacity to perceive themselves as having a significant degree of self-determination and capacity to cope are more likely to avoid and recover from ill health more quickly than those who remain engaged in negative thoughts and feelings.
