= Jeanne Achterberg =

American psychologist (1942–2012)

- Born: April 8, 1942
- Died: March 7, 2012 (aged 69); Pacific Grove, California, US
- Education: Texas Christian University
- Known for: The therapeutic application of guided imagery and creative visualization
- Scientific career
- Fields: Psychology
- Workplaces: Southwestern Medical School; Saybrook Institute

Jeanne Achterberg (8 April 1942 – 7 March 2012) was an American psychologist known for investigating the therapeutic application of guided imagery and creative visualization.

== Education and career ==
Achterberg received her Ph.D.in General Experimental Psychology from Texas Christian University, was a faculty member for 11 years at Southwestern Medical School, and Professor of Psychology at Saybrook Institute, San Francisco. She co-chaired the Mind–body interventions ad hoc advisory panel and the Research Technologies Conference of the National Center for Complementary and Integrative Health (NCCIH), and was a member of the Advisory Board, Unconventional Cancer Treatments Study Group, Office of Technology Assessment, United States Congress, president of the Association for Transpersonal Psychology, and senior editor for the Journal of Alternative and Complementary Medicine

=== Collaboration with Simonton and subsequent research ===
Achterberg was originally influenced by her collaboration with O. Carl Simonton, a specialist in radiology and oncology, and a pioneer of psycho-oncology. Simonton worked with cancer patients to develop strategies by which they could reduce the stress and distress precipitated by diagnosis and treatment, and enhance the capacity to perceive therapeutic interventions, including radiotherapy, as a progressive process toward a successful outcome. Among Simonton's methods was the use of creative visualization, guided imagery and guided meditation; and he observed an alleged correlation between patients' positive images of and thoughts about treatment, and its successful course and outcome.

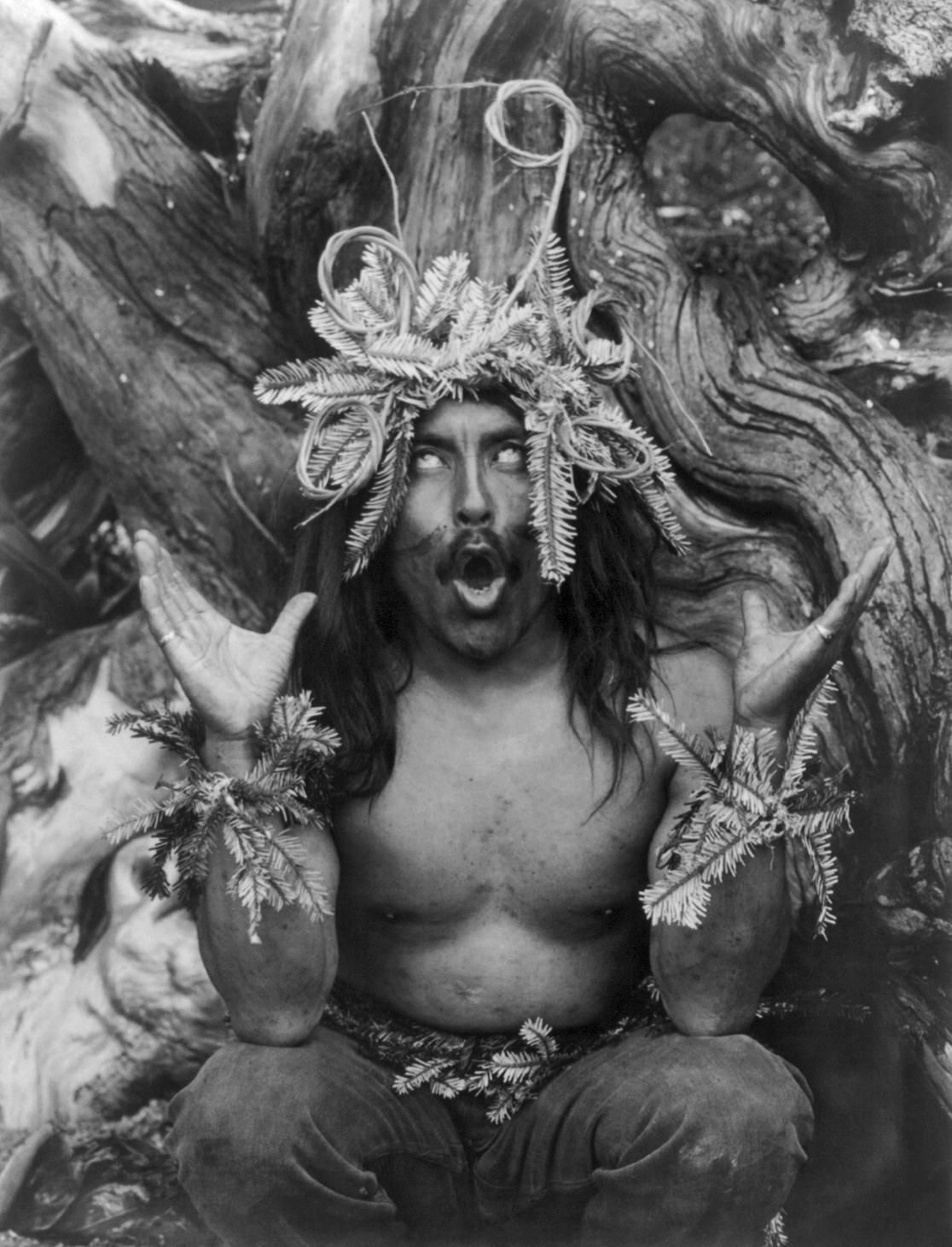
Hamatsa shaman after having spent several days in the woods as part of an initiation ritual.

Achterberg subsequently researched the similarities and differences between the potential use of imagery as an intervention adjuvant to contemporary medicine, and its use in ancient indigenous healing rituals, particularly those she identified as part of a shamanic tradition, which she described in her book Imagery in Healing.

== Death ==
She died of metastatic breast cancer on 7 March 2012.

== Selected works ==
Books

- Achterberg, J., Imagery in healing: Shamanism and modern medicine. Shambhala Publications, 2013.
- Achterberg, J, Woman as healer. Shambhala Publications, 2013.
- Achterberg, J., Rituals of healing: Using imagery for health and wellness. Bantam, 1994.

Articles

- Achterberg J, Cooke K, Richards T, Standish LJ, Kozak L, Lake J. Evidence for correlations between distant intentionality and brain function in recipients: a functional magnetic resonance imaging analysis. J Altern Complement Med. 2005 Dec;11(6):965-71.
- Achterberg, J., Matthews-Simonton, S., and Simonton, O. C., Psychology of the exceptional cancer patient: A description of patients who outlive predicted life expectancies. Psychotherapy: Theory, Research & Practice, Vol. 14, No. 4, 1977, p416.
- Rider, Mark S., and Jeanne Achterberg. "Effect of music-assisted imagery on neutrophils and lymphocytes." Biofeedback and Self-regulation, Vol. 14, No. 3, 1989, pp247–257.
- Achterberg, Jeanne. "The psychological dimensions of arthritis." Journal of Consulting and Clinical Psychology, Vol. 50, No. 6, 1982, p984.
- Gibbs, Harriett W., and Achterberg, J., Spiritual values and death anxiety: Implications for counseling with terminal cancer patients." Journal of Counseling Psychology, Vol. 25, No. 6, 1978, p563.
- Achterberg, J., G. Lawlis, F., O. Carl Simonton, and Matthews-Simonton, S., Psychological factors and blood chemistries as disease outcome predictors for cancer patients. Multivariate Experimental Clinical Research, 1977.
- Williams-Orlando C, and Achterberg J, Patient Beliefs on Children’s Attention Deficit Hyperactivity Disorder. Integrative Medicine: A Clinician’s Journal 2011;10(2):16-21.
