= Caeli enarrant... =

Musical works cycle by Georges Lentz

Caeli enarrant... (Latin for "The Heavens declare...", the first words from Psalm 19), is the name given to a large-scale cycle of musical works by composer Georges Lentz (born 1965). Parts II and VI of the cycle are as yet unpublished. Part VII ('Mysterium') is still in progress.

Part	Subtitle	Year	Instrumentation
I		1989–1998	orchestra
III		1990–2000	12 strings, 3 percussionists, 1 boy soprano
IV		1991–2000	string quartet, 4 suspended cymbals
V		1989–1992	prepared piano
VII; Mysterium	Birrung	1997–2019	11 strings
VII; Mysterium	Ngangkar	1998–2000	orchestra
VII; Mysterium	Nguurraa	2000–2020	clarinet, violin, cello, percussion and piano
VII; Mysterium	Guyuhmgan	2000–2018	orchestra and electronics
VII; Mysterium	Alkere	2002–2013	prepared piano
VII; Mysterium	Monh	2001–2005	solo viola, orchestra and electronics
VII; Mysterium	Ingwe	2003–2018	electric guitar
VII; Mysterium	Jerusalem (after Blake)	2011-2016	orchestra and electronics
VII; Mysterium	String Quartet(s)	2000-2023	pre-recorded string quartet / sound installation permanently projected in the Cobar Sound Chapel
VII; Mysterium	…to beam in distant heavens… - Violin Concerto	2018-2023	violin and orchestra
VII; Mysterium	Anyente	2019-2024	solo viola
