= Meditation music =

Music performed to aid in the practice of meditation

Meditation music is music performed to aid in the practice of meditation. It can have a specific religious content, but also more recently has been associated with modern composers who use meditation techniques in their process of composition, or who compose such music with no particular religious group as a focus. The concept also includes music performed as an act of meditation.

== History ==
Modern meditation music in the 20th century began when composers such as John Cage, Stuart Dempster, Pauline Oliveros, Terry Riley, La Monte Young and Lawrence Ball began to combine meditation techniques and concepts, and music.

Specific works include Karlheinz Stockhausen's Hymnen (1966–67), Stimmung (1968), Aus den sieben Tagen (1968), Mantra (1970) and Inori (1974). Ben Johnston’s Visions and Spells, a realization of Vigil (1976), requires a meditation period prior to performance. R. Murray Schafer's concepts of “clairaudience” (clean hearing) as well as those found in his The Tuning of the World (1977) are meditative.

John Cage was influenced by Zen, and pieces such as Imaginary Landscape No. 4 (1951) for twelve radios are "meditations that measure the passing of time".

Stockhausen describes Aus den sieben Tagen as "intuitive music", and in the piece Es from this cycle the performers are instructed to play only when not thinking or in a state of non-thinking (Von Gunden asserts that this is contradictory and should be "while not thinking about your playing").

In the 21st century, Georges Lentz’ vast and immersive composition String Quartet(s) (2000-2023), permanently projected in the Cobar Sound Chapel in the Australian desert and influenced by the starry night sky, also contains many meditative aspects.

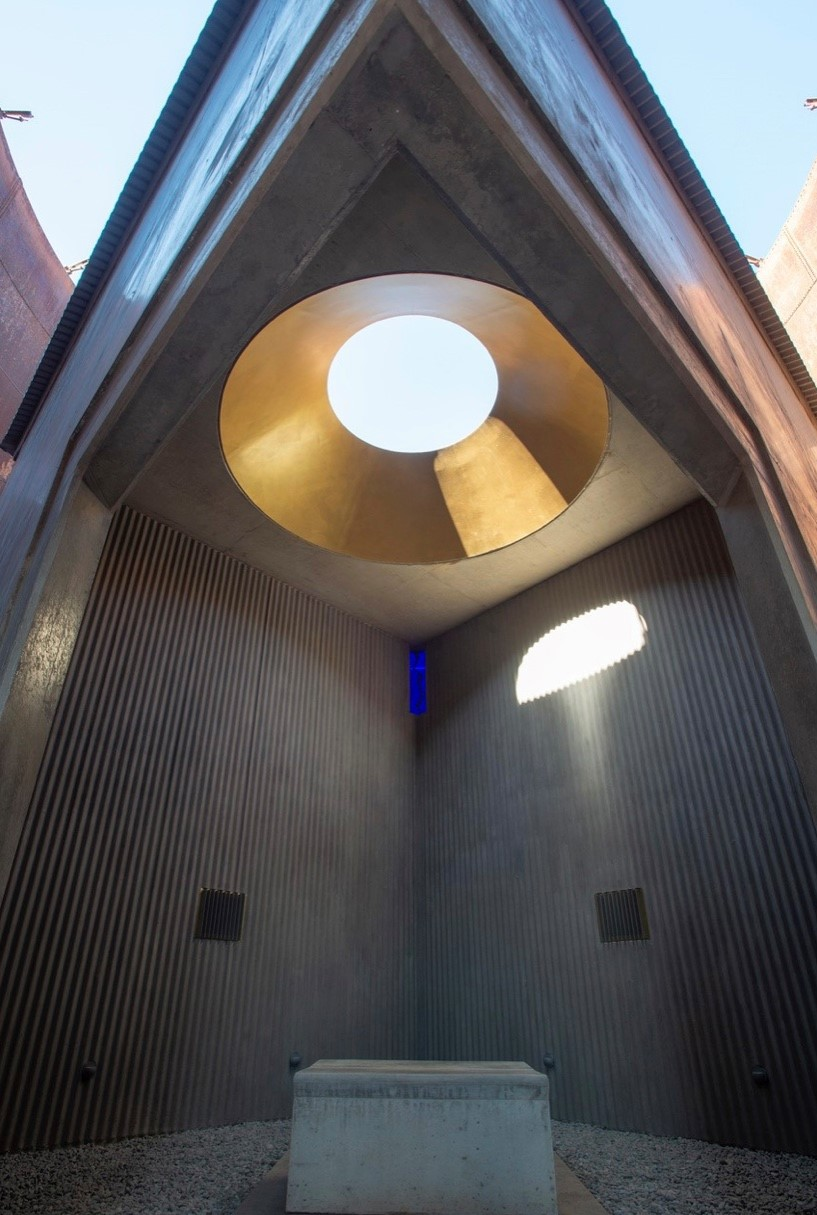
Cobar Sound Chapel, interior

== Relational effects ==
Music can provide many psychological benefits including stress reduction, improved memory, and general improvement to cognitive performance. Research shows that the activity of listening to music can aid individuals in detaching from their surroundings and help them focus on their own thoughts and actions. When applied specifically to a meditative setting, music can aid in mindfulness, visualization, and contemplation. According to the NHS, these qualities can increase personal awareness and help identify signs of stress and anxiety. Practicing mindfulness can help individuals be more observant of their present thoughts and actions. Research shows that meditation music can improve confidence during the practice of meditation.

In a July 2018 study, volunteers between the ages of 60 and 80 who were listening to healing music, meditating for one to two hours a day, and eating a sugar-free healthy diet exhibited sharper memory and cognitive skills with happy and cheerful behavioral patterns compared to those who were not.

Meditation music can help improve focus while performing mechanical tasks. A June 2019 study that observed neurosurgeons performing microsurgical training bypasses with and without meditation music showed a slight improvement in the total time utilized by novice surgeons. While the total time utilized by experienced surgeons remained unchanged, the thread length used in the training bypasses was significantly different for both surgeons.

Meditation music can have positive effects on people recovering from drug addiction. In general, spiritual meditation may promote addiction recovery and improve psychological and mental health outcomes by reducing symptoms of depression, anxiety, and stress. In a January 2020 study, it was concluded that meditation music conducted by Young-Dong Kim can be useful therapy to prevent the reinstatement of methamphetamine addiction during abstinence in rats.

== Christian meditation music ==
Some Christian faiths, particularly the Catholic Church, reject meditation practice from outside their traditions, particularly new-age music. On the other hand, Quartet for the End of Time (1941) by Olivier Messiaen, a practicing Catholic and church organist, is an explicitly Christian piece of meditation music.

== Zen meditation music ==
Specific works include Tony Scott's Music for Zen Meditation.

== See also ==
- Aesthetics of music
- Avant-garde music
- Jazz meditation
- Introspection
