= Guided imagery =

Mind-body therapy

Guided imagery (also known as guided affective imagery, or katathym-imaginative psychotherapy) is a mind-body intervention by which a trained practitioner or teacher helps a participant or patient to evoke and generate mental images that simulate or recreate the sensory perception of sights, sounds, tastes, smells, movements, and images associated with touch, such as texture, temperature, and pressure, as well as imaginative or mental content that the participant or patient experiences as defying conventional sensory categories, and that may precipitate strong emotions or feelings in the absence of the stimuli to which correlating sensory receptors are receptive.

The practitioner or teacher may facilitate this process in person to an individual or a group or you may do it with a virtual group. Alternatively, the participant or patient may follow guidance provided by a sound recording, video, or audiovisual media comprising spoken instruction that may be accompanied by music or sound.

== Mental imagery in everyday life ==
There are two fundamental ways by which mental imagery is generated: voluntary and involuntary.

The involuntary and spontaneous generation of mental images is integral to ordinary sensory perception, and cognition, and occurs without volitional intent. Meanwhile, many different aspects of everyday problem solving, scientific reasoning, and creative activity involve the volitional and deliberate generation of mental images.

=== Involuntary ===
The generation of involuntary mental imagery is created directly from present sensory stimulation and perceptual information, such as when someone sees an object, creates mental images of it, and maintains this imagery as they look away or close their eyes; or when someone hears a noise and maintains an auditory image of it, after the sound ceases or is no longer perceptible.

=== Voluntary ===
Voluntary mental imagery may resemble previous sensory perception and experience, recalled from memory; or the images may be entirely novel and the product of fantasy.

=== Technique ===
The term guided imagery denotes the technique used in the second (voluntary) instance, by which images are recalled from long-term or short-term memory, or created from fantasy, or a combination of both, in response to guidance, instruction, or supervision. Guided imagery is, therefore, the assisted simulation or re-creation of perceptual experience across sensory modalities.

== Clinical investigation and scientific research ==
Mental imagery can result from both voluntary and involuntary processes, and it comprises simulation or recreation of perceptual experience across all sensory modalities, including olfactory imagery, gustatory imagery, haptic imagery, and motor imagery. Nonetheless, visual and auditory mental images are reported as being the most frequently experienced by people ordinarily as well as in controlled experiments, with visual imagery remaining the most extensively researched and documented in scientific literature.

In experimental and cognitive psychology, researchers have concentrated primarily on voluntary and deliberately generated imagery, which the participant or patient creates, inspects, and transforms, such as by evoking imagery of an intimidating social event, and transforming the images into those indicative of a pleasant and self-affirming experience.

In psychopathology, clinicians have typically focused on involuntary imagery which "comes to mind" unbidden, such as in a depressed person's experience of intrusive unwelcome negative images indicative of sadness, hopelessness, and morbidity; or images that recapitulate previous distressing events that characterize posttraumatic stress disorder.

In clinical practice and psychopathology, involuntary mental images are considered intrusive when they occur unwanted and unbidden, "hijacking attention" to some extent.

The maintenance of, or "holding in mind" imagery, whether voluntary or involuntary, places considerable demands upon cognitive attentional resources, including working memory, redirecting them away from a specific cognitive task or general-purpose concentration and toward the imagery.

In clinical practice, this process can be positively exploited therapeutically by training the participant or patient to focus attention on a significantly demanding task, which successfully competes for and directs attention away from the unbidden intrusive imagery, decreasing its intensity, vividness, and duration, and consequently alleviating distress or pain.

== Mental imagery and ill health ==
Mental imagery, especially visual and auditory imagery, can exacerbate and aggravate a number of mental and physical conditions.

This is because, according to the principles of psychophysiology and psychoneuroimmunology, the way an individual perceives his or her mental and physical condition in turn affects biological processes, including susceptibility to illness, infection, or disease; and that perception is derived significantly from mental imagery. That is to say that in some cases, the severity of an individual's mental and physical disability, disorder, or illness is partially determined by his or her images, including their content, vividness or intensity, clarity, and frequency with which they are experienced as intrusive and unbidden.

An individual can aggravate the symptoms and intensify the pain or distress precipitated by many conditions through generating, often involuntarily, mental imagery that emphasizes its severity.

For example, mental imagery has been shown to play a key role in contributing to, exacerbating, or intensifying the experience and symptoms of post-traumatic stress disorder (PTSD), compulsive cravings, eating disorders such as anorexia nervosa and bulimia nervosa, spastic hemiplegia, incapacitation following a stroke or cerebrovascular accident, restricted cognitive function and motor control due to multiple sclerosis, social anxiety or phobia, bipolar disorder, schizophrenia, attention deficit hyperactivity disorder, and depression.

== Example conditions aggravated by mental imagery ==
The aforementioned challenges and difficulties are some of those for which there is evidence to show that an individual can aggravate the symptoms and intensify the pain or distress precipitated by the condition through generating mental imagery that emphasizes its severity.

The following elaborates the way in which such mental imagery contributes to or aggravates four specific conditions:

1. Posttraumatic stress disorder
2. Social anxiety
3. Depression
4. Bipolar disorder

=== Posttraumatic stress disorder ===
Posttraumatic stress disorder often proceeds from experiencing or witnessing a traumatic event involving death, serious injury, or significant threat to others or oneself; and disturbing intrusive images, often described by the patient as 'flashbacks', are a common symptom of this condition across demographics of age, gender, and the nature of the precipitating traumatic event. This unbidden mental imagery is often highly vivid, and provokes memories of the original trauma, accompanied by heightened emotions or feelings and the subjective experience of danger and threat to safety in the present "here and now".

=== Social anxiety ===
Individuals with social anxiety have a higher than normal tendency to fear situations that involve public attention, such as speaking to an audience or being interviewed, meeting people with whom they are unfamiliar, and attending events of an unpredictable nature. As with posttraumatic stress disorder, vivid mental imagery is a common experience for those with social anxiety, and often comprises images that revive and replay a previously experienced stressful, intimidating or harrowing event that precipitated negative feelings, such as embarrassment, shame, or awkwardness. Thereby, mental imagery contributes to the maintenance and persistence of social anxiety, as it does with posttraumatic stress disorder.

In particular, the mental imagery commonly described by those suffering from social anxiety often comprises what cognitive psychologists describe as an "observer perspective". This consists of an image of themselves, as though from an observing person's perspective, in which those suffering from social anxiety perceive themselves negatively, as if from that observing person's point of view. Such imagery is also common among those suffering from other types of anxiety, who often have depleted ability to generate neutral, positive, or pleasant imagery.

=== Depression ===
The capacity to evoke pleasant and positively affirming imagery, either voluntarily or involuntarily, may be a critical requisite for precipitating and sustaining positive moods or feelings and optimism; and this ability is often impaired in those suffering from depression. Depression consists of emotional distress and cognitive impairment that may include feelings of hopelessness, pervasive sadness, pessimism, lack of motivation, social withdrawal, difficulty in concentrating on mental or physical tasks, and disrupted sleep.

Whilst depression is frequently associated with negative rumination of verbal thought patterns manifested as unspoken inner speech, ninety percent of depressed patients reporting distressing intrusive mental imagery that often simulates and recollect previous negative experiences, and which the depressed person often interprets in a way that intensifies feelings of despair and hopelessness. In addition, people suffering from depression have difficulty in evoking prospective imagery indicative of a positive future. The prospective mental imagery experienced by depressed persons when at their most despairing commonly includes vivid and graphic images related to suicide, which some psychologists and psychiatrists refer to as "flash-forwards".

=== Bipolar disorder ===
Bipolar disorder is characterized by manic episodes interspersed with periods of depression; 90% of patients experience comorbid anxiety disorder at some stage; and there is a significant prevalence of suicide amongst sufferers. Prospective mental imagery indicative of hyperactivity or mania and hopelessness contributes to the manic and depressive episodes respectively in bipolar disorder.

== Principles ==
The therapeutic use of guided imagery, as part of a multimodal treatment plan incorporating other suitable methods, such as guided meditation, receptive music therapy, and relaxation techniques, as well as physical medicine and rehabilitation, and psychotherapy, aims to educate the patient in altering their mental imagery, replacing images that compound pain, recollect and reconstruct distressing events, intensify feelings of hopelessness, or reaffirm debilitation, with those that emphasize physical comfort, functional capacity, mental equanimity, and optimism.

Whether the guided imagery is provided in person by a facilitator, or delivered via media, the verbal instruction consists of words, often pre-scripted, intended to direct the participant's attention to imagined visual, auditory, tactile, gustatory or olfactory sensations that precipitate a positive psychologic and physiologic response that incorporates increased mental and physical relaxation and decreased mental and physical stress.

Guided imagery is one of the means by which therapists, teachers, or practitioners seek to achieve this outcome, and involves encouraging patients or participants to imagine alternative perspectives, thoughts, and behaviors, mentally rehearsing strategies that they may subsequently actualize, thereby developing increased coping skills and ability.

== Stages ==
According to the computational theory of imagery, which is derived from experimental psychology, guided imagery comprises four phases:

1. Image generation
2. Image maintenance
3. Image inspection
4. Image transformation

=== Image generation ===
Image generation involves generating mental imagery, either directly from sensory data and perceptual experience, or from memory, or from fantasy.

=== Image maintenance ===
Image maintenance involves the volitional sustaining or maintaining of imagery, without which, a mental image is subject to rapid decay with an average duration of only 250 ms. This is because volitionally created mental images usually fade rapidly once generated in order to avoid disrupting or confusing the process of ordinary sensory perception.

The natural brief duration of mental imagery means that the active maintenance stage of guided imagery, which is necessary for the subsequent stages of inspection and transformation, requires cognitive concentration of attention by the participant. This concentrative attentional ability can be improved with the practice of mental exercises, including those derived from guided meditation and supervised meditative praxis. Even with such practice, some people can struggle to maintain a mental image "clearly in mind" for more than a few seconds; not only for imagery created through fantasy but also for mental images generated from both long-term memory and short-term memory.

In addition, while the majority of the research literature has tended to focus on the maintenance of visual mental images, imagery in other sensory modalities also necessitates a volitional maintenance process in order for further inspection or transformation to be possible.

The requisite for practice in sustaining attentional control, such that attention remains focused on maintaining generated imagery, is one of the reasons that guided meditation, which supports such concentration, is often integrated into the provision of guided imagery as part of the intervention. Guided meditation assists participants in extending the duration for which generated mental images are maintained, providing time to inspect the imagery, and proceed to the final transformation stage of guided imagery.

=== Image inspection ===
Once generated and maintained, a mental image can be inspected to provide the basis for interpretation, and transformation. For visual imagery, inspection often involves a scanning process, by which the participant directs attention across and around an image, simulating shifts in perceptual perspective.

Inspection processes can be applied both to imagery created spontaneously, and to imagery generated in response to scripted or impromptu verbal descriptions provided by the facilitator.

=== Image transformation ===
Finally, with the assistance of verbal instruction from the guided imagery practitioner or teacher, the participant transforms, modifies, or alters the content of generated mental imagery, in such a way as to substitute images that provoke negative feelings, are indicative of suffering, or that reaffirm disability or debilitation for those that elicit positive emotion, and are suggestive of resourcefulness, ability to cope, and an increased degree of mental and physical capacity.

This process shares principles with those that inform the clinical psychology techniques of "imagery restructuring" or "imagery re-scripting" as used in cognitive behavioral therapy.

While the majority of research findings on image transformation relate to visual mental imagery, there is evidence to support transformations in other sensory modalities such as auditory imagery. and haptic imagery.

=== Outcome of image generation, maintenance, inspection, and transformation ===
Through this technique, a patient is assisted in reducing the tendency to evoke images indicative of the distressing, painful, or debilitative nature of a condition, and learns instead to evoke mental imagery of their identity, body, and circumstances that emphasizes the capacity for autonomy and self-determination, positive proactive activity, and the ability to cope, whilst managing their condition.

As a result, symptoms become less incapacitating, pain is to some degree decreased, while coping skills increase.

== Requisite for absorption ==
In order for the foregoing process to take place effectively, such that all four stages of guided imagery are completed with therapeutic beneficial effect, the patient or participant must be capable of or susceptible to absorption, which is an "openness to absorbing and self-altering experiences". This is a further reason why guided meditation or some form of meditative praxis, relaxation techniques, and meditation music or receptive music therapy are often combined with or form an integral part of the operational and practical use of the guided imagery intervention. For, all those techniques can increase the participant's or patient's capacity for or susceptibility to absorption, thereby increasing the potential efficacy of guided imagery.

== As a mind-body intervention ==
The United States National Center for Complementary and Integrative Health (NCCIH), which is among twenty-seven organizations that make up the National Institutes of Health (NIH), classifies guided imagery and guided meditation, as mind–body interventions, one of five domains of medical and health care systems, practices, and products that are not presently considered part of conventional medicine.

The NCCIH defines mind-body interventions as those practices that "employ a variety of techniques designed to facilitate the mind's capacity to affect bodily function and symptoms", and include guided imagery, guided meditation and forms of meditative praxis, hypnosis and hypnotherapy, prayer, as well as art therapy, music therapy, and dance therapy.

All mind–body interventions, including the aforementioned, focus on the interaction between the brain, body, and behavior and are practiced with intention to use the mind to alter physical function and promote overall health and wellbeing.

There are documented benefits of mind-body interventions derived from scientific research firstly into their use in contributing to the treatment a range of conditions including headaches, coronary artery disease and chronic pain; secondly in ameliorating the symptoms of chemotherapy-induced nausea, vomiting, and localised physical pain in patients with cancer; thirdly in increasing the perceived capacity to cope with significant problems and challenges; and fourthly in improving the reported overall quality-of-life. In addition, there is evidence supporting the brain and central nervous system's influence on the immune system and the capacity for mind-body interventions to enhance immune function outcomes, including defense against and recovery from infection and disease.

Guided imagery has also demonstrated efficacy in reducing postoperative discomfort as well as chronic pain related to cancer, arthritis, and physical injury. Furthermore, the non-clinical uses for which the efficacy of guided imagery has been shown include managing the stress of public performance among musicians, enhancing athletic and competitive sports ability, and training medical students in surgical skills. The evidence that it is effective for non-musculoskeletal pain is encouraging but not definitive.

== Evidence and explanation ==
Evidence and explanations for the effectiveness and limitations of creative visualization come from two discrete sources: cognitive psychology and psychoneuroimmunology.

=== Cognitive psychology ===
Guided imagery is employed as an adjunctive technique to psychological therapies in the treatment of many conditions, including those identified in the previous sections. It plays a significant role in the application of cognitive approaches to psychotherapy, including cognitive behavioral therapy, rational emotive behavior therapy, schema therapy, and mindfulness-based cognitive therapy.

These therapies derive from or draw substantially upon a model of mental functioning initially established by Aaron T. Beck, a psychiatrist and psychoanalyst who posited that the subjective way in which people perceive themselves and interpret experiences influences their emotional, behavioral, and physiological reactions to circumstances. He additionally discovered that by assisting patients in correcting their misperceptions and misinterpretations, and aiding them in modifying unhelpful and self-deprecating ways of thinking about themselves and their predicament, his patients had more productive reactions to events, and developed a more positive self-concept, self-image, or perception of themselves.

This use of guided imagery is based on the following premise. Everyone participates in both the voluntary and involuntary spontaneous generation of visual, auditory and other mental images, which is a necessary part of the way in which a person solves problems, recollects the past, predicts and plans the future, and formulates their self-perception, self-image, or the way they 'view' and perceive themselves.

However, this self-image can be altered and self-regulated with the aid of mind-body interventions including guided imagery, by which an individual changes the way he or she visualizes, imagines, and perceives themselves generally, and their physical condition, body image, and mental state specifically.

=== Psychoneuroimmunology ===
The term "psychoneuroimmunology" was coined by American psychologist Robert Ader in 1981 to describe the study of interactions between psychological, neurological, and immune systems.

Three years later, Jean Achterberg published a book called Imagery in Healing that sought to relate and correlate contemporaneous evidence from the then emerging scientific study of the way mental processes influence physical and physiological function, with particular emphasis on mental imagery, to the folklore she extrapolated from a set of diverse ancient and geographically indigenous practices previously described as 'shamanism' by the historian of religion and professor at the University of Chicago, Mircea Eliade; and a number of anthropologists and ethnologists.

The fundamental hypothesis of psychoneuroimmunology is concisely that the way people think and how they feel directly influences the electrochemistry of the brain and central nervous system, which in turn has a significant influence on the immune system and its capacity to defend the body against disease, infection, and ill health. Meanwhile, the immune system affects brain chemistry and its electrical activity, which in turn has a considerable impact on the way we think and feel.

Because of this interplay, a person's negative thoughts, feelings, and perceptions, such as pessimistic predictions about the future, regretful ruminations upon the past, low self-esteem, and depleted belief in self-determination and a capacity to cope can undermine the efficiency of the immune system, increasing vulnerability to ill health. Simultaneously, the biochemical indicators of ill health monitored by the immune system feeds back to the brain via the nervous system, which exacerbates thoughts and feelings of a negative nature. That is to say, we feel and think of ourselves as unwell, which contributes to physical conditions of ill health, which in turn cause us to feel and think of ourselves as unwell.

However, the interplay between cognitive and emotional, neurological, and immunological processes also provides for the possibility of positively influencing the body and enhancing physical health by changing the way we think and feel. For example, people who are able to deconstruct the cognitive distortions that precipitate perpetual pessimism and hopelessness and further develop the capacity to perceive themselves as having a significant degree of self-determination and capacity to cope are more likely to avoid and recover from ill health more quickly than those who remain engaged in negative thoughts and feelings.

This simplification of a complex interaction of interrelated systems and the capacity of the mind to influence the body does not account for the significant influence that other factors have on mental and physical well-being, including exercise, diet, and social interaction.

Nonetheless, in helping people to make such changes to their habitual thought processes and pervasive feelings, mind-body interventions, including creative visualization, when provided as part of a multimodal and interdisciplinary treatment program of other methods, such as cognitive behavioral therapy, have been shown to contribute significantly to treatment of and recovery from a range of conditions.

In addition, there is evidence supporting the brain and central nervous system's influence on the immune system and the capacity for mind-body interventions to enhance immune function outcomes, including defense against and recovery from infection and disease.

== See also ==
- Creative visualization – Purposeful visualisation for neuropsychological, physiological or social effects
- Guided meditation – Techniques to train attention and awareness
- Mental image – Representation in the mind of objects, activities or events, whether they existed or not
- Psychoneuroimmunology – Area of study within psychosomatic medicine
- O. Carl Simonton – American physician
- Tulpa – Entity manifesting from mental powers
