= Zane Banks =

Australian guitarist

Zane 'Moses' Banks
- Born: 1986 (age 38–39)
- Origin: Sydney, Australia
- Genres: classical experimental jazz blues rock country
- Occupation(s): guitarist composer
- Instrument(s): Electric guitar, classical guitar, acoustic guitar, banjo
- Website: zanebanks.com

Zane Banks (born 1986) is an Australian guitarist from Sydney, who plays both classical and electric guitars in a variety of musical genres. Banks premiered the 1-hour long solo electric guitar work, Ingwe, by composer Georges Lentz.

== Biography ==
Zane Banks was born in 1986, and both his parents are music teachers. He attended Newtown High School of the Performing Arts. Subsequently, he completed a Bachelor of Music degree with First Class Honours on the classical guitar at the Sydney Conservatorium of Music with Gregory Pikler and Phillip Houghton. He completed a Doctorate in Music under the supervision of Richard Toop and Matthew Hindson. Banks is active within the Australian contemporary music scene and promotes the status of the electric guitar as a virtuosic concert hall instrument.

Zane Banks premiered the 1-hour long solo electric guitar work, Ingwe, by composer Georges Lentz. Banks first performed Ingwe in its original version at the Rainy Days Festival for contemporary music at Philharmonie Luxembourg in December 2007 and has since performed the work at various international festivals (Melbourne Festival, Vale of Glamorgan Festival UK, Amsterdam Electric Guitar Festival) as well as recording it for Naxos Records.

Banks maintains a career as a performer in jazz, rock, blues, country and (mainly contemporary) classical music. He has performed with ensembles and at festivals, ISCM World Music Days Festival, Rainy Days New Music Festival, Australian Opera and Ballet Orchestra, Melbourne International Arts Festival, Chronology Arts Ensemble, Sydney Conservatorium's Modern Music Ensemble, Eminence Symphony Orchestra and in his own bands The Vandemonians and Maharani Cantus.

In December 2011, Zane Banks was voted Best Newcomer in the 2011 Limelight magazine awards.
