= Imagery =

Creatives' use of symbolism or figurative language to add depth to their work

Imagery is the literary device of using sensory language: figurative language that evokes a mental image or other kinds of vivid sense impressions in the reader's or listener's imagination. Less commonly known by the Greek term enargia, imagery can also be instrumental, in storytelling, for conveying tone, mood, symbolism, and other narrative elements.

In order to succeed with imagery, writers use accompanying forms of figurative language to convey a certain message, idea, situation, setting, aesthetic, among others. That way, writers are able to get the readers to understand the ideas being conveyed without the original intent being lost.

== Uses with other forms of figurative language ==
Imagery can be used with other forms of figurative language including:

- with metaphors or similes, specificity is provided to whatever the reader is imagining because of comparisons presented.
- with symbolism, the underlying meaning placed onto something/someone as a result of symbolism creates a connection with a specific idea to a broader concept.
- with rhythm, creating an atmosphere for the reader as well as setting the pace/flow for a text.

== Types ==
There are five major types of sensory imagery, each corresponding to a sense, feeling, action, or reaction:

- Visual imagery pertains to graphics, visual scenes, pictures, or the sense of sight.
  - Builds the setting of the story as well as the characters that are a part of the story.
  - One of the most commonly used types of imagery.
- Auditory imagery pertains to sounds, noises, music, or the sense of hearing. (This kind of imagery may come in the form of onomatopoeia.)
  - Dialogue can give depth to interpersonal relationships and conflicts that arise between characters.
- Olfactory imagery pertains to odors, aromas, scents, or the sense of smell.
  - Intensifies the vividness of the setting, and plants the readers within the story.
- Gustatory imagery pertains to flavors or the sense of taste.
- Tactile imagery pertains to physical textures or the sense of touch.
  - Amplifies intimacy between characters as well as the world around them.

Other types of imagery include:

- Kinesthetic imagery pertains to movements.
  - Can increase pacing within a text, as well as giving life to the scenery provided to readers.
- Organic imagery / subjective imagery, pertains to personal experiences of a character's body, including emotion and the senses of hunger, thirst, fatigue, and pain.
- Phenomenological, pertains to the mental conception of an item as opposed to the physical version.
- Color imagery is the ability to visualize a color in its absence.

== 3 necessities for imagination ==
- Directedness: putting the imagination's focus on a specific person, place, thing, event, etc.
- Activity: because one is imagining something, they are actively exercising the muscle that is their brain.
- Phenomenology: while one is imagining something, they can relate it to something that is relatively similar to it.
