= Mindfulness-Oriented Recovery Enhancement =

Mind-body therapy program

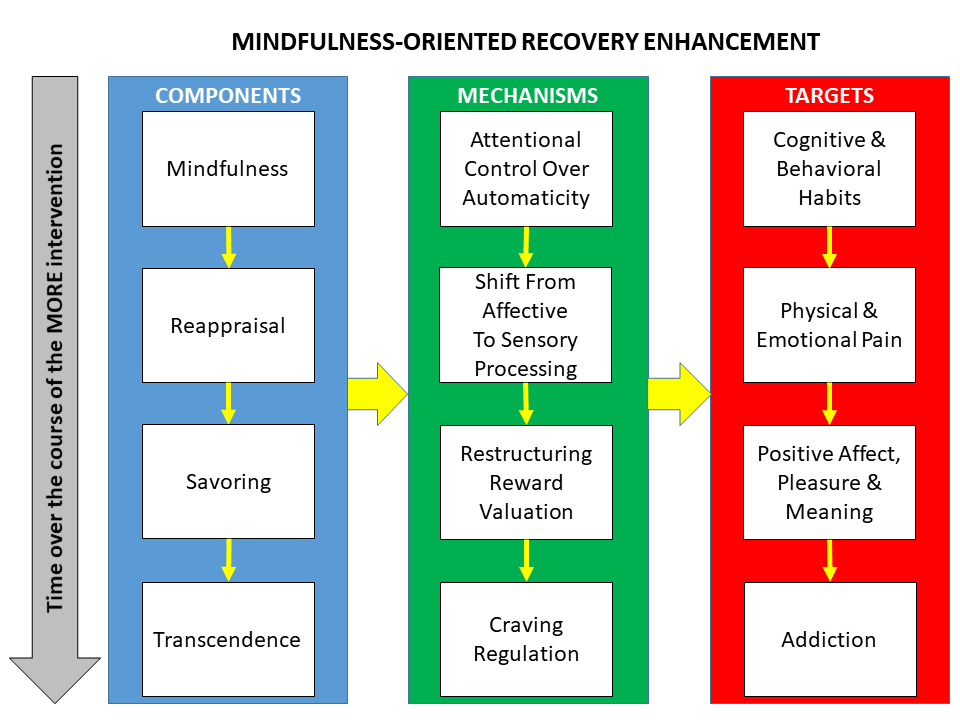
A conceptual framework depicting the primary treatment components, therapeutic mechanisms, and clinical targets of MORE

Mindfulness-Oriented Recovery Enhancement (MORE) is an evidence-based mind-body therapy program developed by Eric Garland. It is a therapeutic approach grounded in affective neuroscience that combines mindfulness training with reappraisal and savoring skills. Garland developed this approach by combining the key features of mindfulness training, "Third Wave" cognitive-behavioral therapy, and principles from positive psychology.

MORE has been tested through multiple clinical trials funded by the National Institutes of Health. Research shows that MORE reduces addictive behavior, emotional distress, and chronic pain while increasing positive emotions, self-transcendence, and meaning in life.

== Technique ==
=== Basics ===
MORE was developed by integrating aspects of mindfulness training, third-wave cognitive behavioral therapy, and principles from positive psychology. MORE differs from other empirically supported treatments in that it also teaches savoring skills to amplify positive emotions and increase pleasure from naturally rewarding experiences. Through these techniques, MORE claims to enhance eudaimonic meaning in life, and to connect individuals with a transcendent sense of self.

MORE is dependent on three core principles: Mindfulness, Reappraisal and Savoring. Through mindfulness people are taught to become aware of when their attention is fixated on emotional or physical pain, stressors, or the addictive cues, and then to regulate this attentional fixation. Mindfulness is used to shift from affective to sensory processing of craving, stress, and pain by via meditation techniques that deconstruct these aversive experiences into their subcomponent sensations (e.g., heat, tightness, tingling). Clients are taught to attend the borders, permeability, and fluctuation of such sensations from the detached perspective of a witness or observer.

With reappraisal, people are taught to first use mindfulness to disrupt the habitual negative thought patterns that fuel negative emotions and craving, and then to reframe negative thoughts into more adaptive interpretations of stressful life events to find meaning in the face of adversity. In the third part, savoring, people are taught to use mindfulness to focus on the pleasant sensory features (visual, auditory, olfactory, gustatory, tactile, kinesthetic) of pleasant everyday events, while appreciating and amplifying any positive emotions or pleasant body sensations arising during the savoring experience.

== Research ==
In 2010, the first Stage 1 randomized controlled trial (RCT) was conducted with alcohol use disorder (AUD) patients. The study highlighted MORE's effects on addiction with alcohol attentional bias and autonomic recovery from alcohol cue-exposure. It was found that MORE increased physiological recovery and targeted key mechanisms involved in alcohol dependence. Later on, MORE was studied in a sample of formerly homeless people with co-occurring substance use disorders (SUDs) and psychiatric disorders in a Stage 3 RCT. MORE reduced craving and PTSD symptoms and performed better than cognitive-behavioral therapy (CBT) as well as treatment-as-usual (TAU).

In a 2014 randomized controlled trial, compared to participants in supportive group therapy, MORE participants reported less opioid misuse, less desire for opioids, reduction in stress arousal, and decreased pain severity. Randomized controlled trials also showed that individuals who received MORE exhibited reduced opioid cue-reactivity and increased responses to natural reward stimuli.

In 2019, a randomized clinical trial tested if MORE could restructure brain reward responsiveness from valuing drug-related rewards back to valuing natural rewards. Study participants were randomized to eight weeks of MORE to eight weeks of a support group control. MORE was shown to decrease EEG responses in opioid cues and increase EEG responses to natural reward cues. The therapeutic effects of MORE on opioid misuse were mediated by increases in responsiveness to natural reward cues. MORE has also been studied as a treatment for smoking cessation. In a Stage 1 RCT, using fMRI MORE was shown to alter frontostriatal reward processes among cigarette smokers.

In a 2021 pilot randomized clinical trial of Mindfulness-Oriented Recovery Enhancement was studied as an adjunct to methadone treatment for people with opioid use disorder and chronic pain. Participants on MORE evidenced fewer days of illicit drug use, less pain, and lower levels of craving as compared to treatment as usual. It was also reported that participants in MORE demonstrated higher levels of well-being.

In 2022, a trial on MORE was published in JAMA Internal Medicine. The efficacy of MORE was examined in reducing comorbid chronic pain and opioid misuse in the primary care setting. This randomized clinical trial, included 250 participants with both chronic pain and opioid misuse. It was reported that participants receiving MORE showed significant improvement in and opioid misusing and pain symptoms, and sustained reductions in emotional distress, and opioid craving compared to those on supportive psychotherapy. MORE reduced opioid misuse by 45% at the 9-month follow-up, more than doubling the effect of standard supportive therapy, and 50% of patients reported clinically significant decreases in chronic pain severity.

A 2022 meta-analysis of RCTs quantitatively synthesized the research works on MORE focused on examining the therapeutic effects on addictive behaviors, craving, opioid dose, pain, and psychiatric symptoms. A total of 816 participants with a range of addiction disorders, psychiatric and chronic pain conditions were included in the multiple RCTs conducted. This meta-analysis provides empirical evidence of MORE's efficacy. Another meta-analysis in 2017 also revealed mindfulness strategies are found to be significant in reducing stress levels, cravings, and substance abuse.

== Criticisms ==
Jay Memmott in the book review of Mindfulness-Oriented Recovery Enhancement for Addiction, Stress, and Pain stated that Garland's claim that MORE is innovative because "it combines mindfulness techniques with principles drawn from cognitive therapy and the positive psychology literature" is untrue. Several other authors including "Kabat-Zinn, Segal, Williams, and Teasdale, and Watts have also presented their therapy models on mindfulness with a focus on cognition." That said, none of these therapies provide direct training in cognitive reappraisal or savoring skills.
