= Jazz meditation =

Meditation with jazz music

Jazz meditation refers to guided meditation practice that incorporates live instrumental jazz music. During a typical jazz meditation performance, a meditation guide or teacher is accompanied by one or more musicians, and musical improvisation is used as an anchor for mindfulness techniques such as visualization and breathing exercises. An audience of seated participants meditate in response to live music and the teacher's spoken instructions.

== History ==
=== Roots in Buddhism and jazz ===
Since the mid-20th Century, there has been an evolving relationship between jazz musicians and Buddhist meditative practices. From the emergence of the Beat Generation artists in the post World War II era United States, through the counter-culture 1960s and New Age and experimental aesthetics of the late 20th Century, musicians have found rich inspiration as well as discipline in many of the same concepts that are fundamental to Buddhist practices.

Meditation concepts that have been integrated into jazz theory and performance include: being in the present moment; concentration; following the mind; following the breath; returning to the anchor concept of focus; placing priority on the action in the present, not in a theory. Particular Buddhist teachings such as esoteric ideas of non-verbal deep insight and communication, and the benefits of chanting (rhythmic repetition of sound) - have strong analogues in jazz performance.

Several late 20th Century and contemporary jazz musicians have acknowledged drawing inspiration from meditation and Buddhist practices, including John Coltrane, John McLaughlin, Don Cherry, Wayne Shorter, Yusef Lateef, Sonny Rollins, and Herbie Hancock.

"When [John Coltrane] created A Love Supreme. He had meditated that week. I almost didn't see him downstairs. And it was so quiet! There was no sound, no practice! He was up there meditating, and when he came down he said, "I have a whole new music!" He said, "There is a new recording that I will do, I have it all, everything." And it was so beautiful! He was like Moses coming down from the mountain. And when he recorded it, he knew everything, everything. He said this was the first time that he had all the music in his head at once to record." - Alice Coltrane

=== Contemporary practice ===
Several academic institutions offer courses and degree programs linking contemplative practice with jazz, including the Berklee School of Music and the University of Michigan School of Music, Theatre & Dance. Verve Records' compilation album Jazz for Meditation was released in the UK in 2007. Jazz meditation as a live music program originated at the Shinnyo Center for Meditation and Well-being in New York City and at the Mass Bliss Arts and Awareness Festival in the Berkshires. Since 2015, the Festival Jazz à Saint-Germain-des-Prés Paris has been proposing "Jazz & Meditation" sessions with a therapist specialized in MBSR (Mindfulness Based Stress Reduction), Elisabeth Petit-Lizop, and the Festival artistic director Frédéric Charbaut.

== See also ==
- Music Therapy
- Meditation
- Mindfulness
