= Georges Lentz =

Luxembourgish-Australian composer

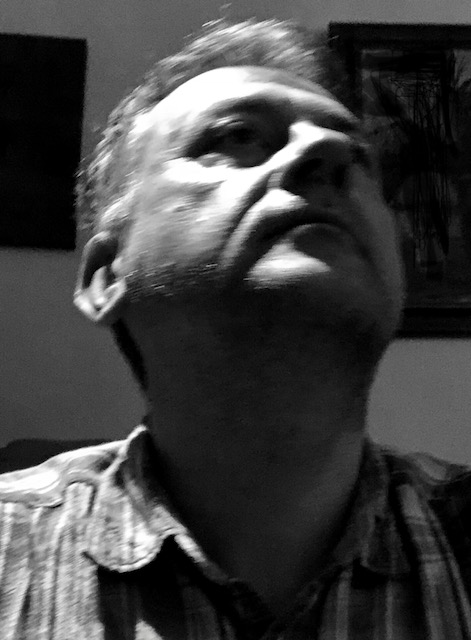
- Lentz in 2017
- Born: 22 October 1965 (age 61); Luxembourg City, Luxembourg
- Occupations: Composer; Sound artist; Digital artist
- Website: www.georgeslentz.com

Georges Lentz (born 22 October 1965) is a contemporary composer and sound artist born in Luxembourg in 1965 and that country's internationally best known composer. Since 1990, he has been living in Sydney, Australia. Despite his relatively small output and his reclusiveness, he is also considered one of Australia's leading composers on the world stage. His music, all of which is part of one huge ongoing cycle of independent works, Caeli enarrant..., is inspired by the starry night sky in the Australian Outback and by Aboriginal art.

He is the creator of the Cobar Sound Chapel.

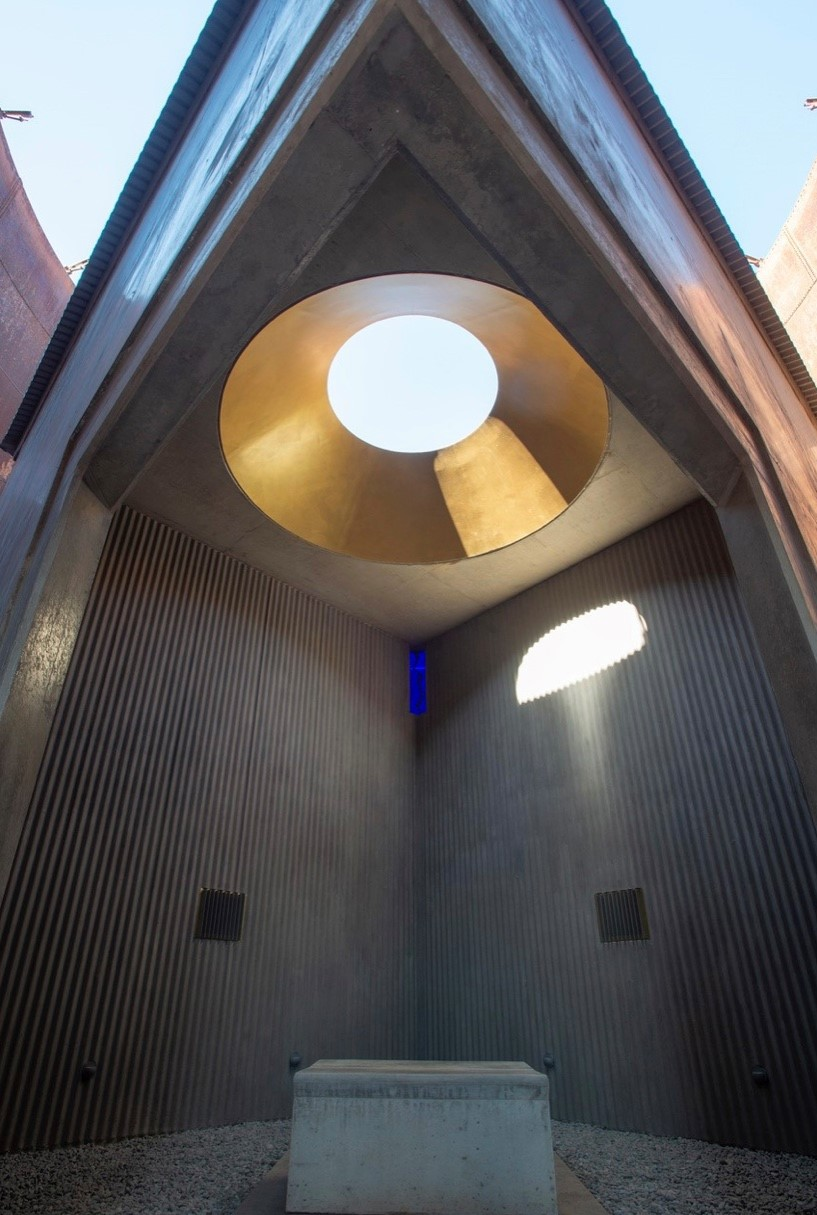
Interior of the Cobar Sound Chapel

== Life ==
Born in Luxembourg City on 22 October 1965, Lentz grew up in the Luxembourg town of Echternach. He studied at the Luxembourg Conservatoire and later at the Paris Conservatoire (1982–1986) and the Musikhochschule Hannover (1986–1990). In 1989, he began working on a cycle of compositions titled Caeli enarrant.... His music is being recognised increasingly around the world, with performances at the Berlin Philharmonie, the Vienna Musikverein and Konzerthaus, Concertgebouw Amsterdam, Wigmore Hall London, Carnegie Hall New York, Kennedy Center Washington, Suntory Hall Tokyo, Sydney Opera House. Many orchestras have performed his works, including the BBC Symphony Orchestra in London, BBC National Orchestra of Wales, Hallé Orchestra of Manchester, Deutsches Symphonie-Orchester Berlin, Bamberger Symphoniker, Kölner Philharmoniker, Düsseldorfer Symphoniker, Netherlands Radio Symphony Orchestra, ORF Symphony Orchestra in Vienna, Warsaw Philharmonic, St. Louis Symphony Orchestra, Tokyo Metropolitan Symphony Orchestra, New Japan Philharmonic, Sydney Symphony Orchestra and Melbourne Symphony Orchestra among others. His orchestral work Guyuhmgan, from part VII of the cycle Mysterium was the foremost recommended work at UNESCO's 2002 International Rostrum of Composers in Paris. His compositions include a work for viola, orchestra and electronics called Monh written for Tabea Zimmermann, as well as Ingwe for solo electric guitar, written for the Australian guitarist Zane Banks.

Being given to self-doubt and reclusiveness, Lentz rarely publishes new works and rarely accepts commissions. He is said to retire to an abbey (Clervaux Abbey in Luxembourg) or the Australian desert to find inspiration and compose, and only very rarely gives interviews. Lentz didn't attend the 2009 APRA Classical Music Awards ceremony at the Sydney Opera House to accept that year's top prize for Best Composition by an Australian Composer, instead sending guitarist friend Zane Banks to pick up the award and read out his acceptance speech (21 September 2009). A 40-minute documentary about the birth of Ingwe which appeared on YouTube in May 2010 shows Lentz for a total of about 30 seconds. In May 2022, the following note appeared on the composer's website: "About a year ago, I was persuaded to agree to interviews in the lead-up to the opening of the new Cobar Sound Chapel. I have pushed myself to go along with media requests I was very uncomfortable with. This has led me to a state of total mental exhaustion. I therefore regret to say there will be no more interviews." In June 2025, an audio-only conversation between Georges Lentz and ChatGPT-4 about music and AI, recorded the previous month in the remoteness of the Australian Outback, appeared on YouTube.

In the 2012/13 season, Lentz was in residence at the Internationales Künstlerhaus Villa Concordia in Bamberg, Germany and collaborated with Jonathan Nott and the Bamberger Symphoniker.

In January 2015, a new orchestral work, Jerusalem (after Blake), taking its inspiration from Jerusalem by William Blake, was premiered by the Luxembourg Philharmonic Orchestra. In May 2015, a portrait concert of Lentz's music by the Munich Chamber Orchestra at the Pinakothek der Moderne included the world premiere of the definitive version of Birrung (1997–2014) for 11 strings. In November 2016, the final version of Jerusalem was premiered at Wien Modern, and the work’s US premiere was given in April 2017, with the Saint Louis Symphony Orchestra conducted by David Robertson.

In April 2022, a major new sound art project, the Cobar Sound Chapel, opened in Cobar in Outback New South Wales. It is a purpose-built venue to permanently house the 4-channel projection of Lentz's digital string quartet, the 43 hour composition String Quartet(s) (2000–2023), as well as the venue for a new annual String Quartet Festival Weekend. The Cobar Sound Chapel was designed by Pritzker Prize-winning Australian architect Glenn Murcutt in collaboration with the composer, with its architecture reflecting rhythmic and structural patterns found in String Quartet(s).

A new violin concerto, "...to beam in distant heavens...", was premiered to great acclaim by German soloist Arabella Steinbacher with the Sydney Symphony Orchestra at the Sydney Opera House in April 2023. The German premiere took place on February 9, 2025 at Elbphilharmonie Hamburg with Steinbacher and the West German Radio Symphony Orchestra. The Japanese premiere took place in June 2025, and the first Finnish performance will be in Helsinki in April 2027 with the Finnish Radio Symphony Orchestra.

The violin concerto was selected for the Fondation Prince Pierre de Monaco Composition Prize in 2024.

A new work for solo viola, Anyente, was premiered by Tabea Zimmermann on December 1, 2024 at Pierre-Boulez-Saal in Berlin.

According to the composer’s website, he is currently writing new works for Anthony Marwood and the Australian Chamber Orchestra, as well as for Tabea Zimmermann and the Saint Paul Chamber Orchestra

Lentz’s music is published by Universal Edition in Vienna.

== Music ==
Lentz's music expresses his fascination with astronomy as well as his love of the Australian Outback and Aboriginal art (in particular the works of Kathleen Petyarre), and reflects his spiritual and existential beliefs, questions and doubts.

Lentz's music shows the influence of the French Spectralists and, to some degree, the New Complexity movement (unusual instrumental combinations, extended playing techniques etc.). It is often soft, fluctuates between polyphonic intricacy and fragile monody and sometimes contains extended silences.

Lentz's scores of recent years (Mysterium) are written in an unusual rhythmic system, where each bar contains four beats, but the beats can be of different lengths. While it is not clear why Lentz has adopted this idiosyncratic system, the textures and colours (occasionally with delicate layers of computer-generated sounds) superimposed over the top of these rigid "grids" often give it a shimmering or 'twinkling' quality.

Another feature particularly of his orchestral works is a sense of harmony incorporating both microtonality and, now and then, an austere sense of 'twisted' tonality, with the occasional harmonic progression fleetingly reminiscent of Schumann or Bruckner, also perhaps of Messiaen. However, these chorale-like fragments are always brief and buried in the texture of the music, giving the impression of something "long forgotten".

Lentz has said that in recent years he has been increasingly interested in, and influenced by, the practices of musical improvisation, music technology, sound art and digital art.

Ingwe is a 60-minute work for solo electric guitar, possibly the longest solo composition ever written for the instrument. It contrasts sharply, in many ways, with Lentz's prior music and takes the electric guitar into dimensions previously unexplored in a 'classical' context. Ingwe also contains, for the first time in Lentz's output, a short section that relinquishes strict control over the musical material and gives some improvisational freedom to the performer.

Both Jerusalem (after Blake) and String Quartet(s) testify to Lentz's love of William Blake's visionary epic Jerusalem the Emanation of the Giant Albion.

In the final analysis Lentz's music, born from "total silence and radical isolation – at the very real risk of hearing nothing at all" (composer's website), seems to be torn between feelings of awe and an over-riding struggle with spiritual doubt and existential loneliness.

== Principal works ==
=== Caeli enarrant... (1989 to date) ===
| Part | Subtitle | Year | Instrumentation | Duration |
|---|---|---|---|---|
| I | | 1989–1998 | orchestra | 40 min. |
| III | | 1990–2000 | 12 strings, 3 percussionists, 1 boy soprano | 14 min. |
| IV | | 1991–2000 | string quartet, 4 suspended cymbals | 27 min. |
| V | | 1989–1992 | prepared piano | 10 min. |
| VII; Mysterium | Birrung | 1997–2019 | 11 strings | 13 min. |
| VII; Mysterium | Ngangkar | 1998–2000 | orchestra | 14 min. |
| VII; Mysterium | Nguurraa | 2000–2020 | clarinet, violin, cello, percussion and piano | 11min. |
| VII; Mysterium | Guyuhmgan | 2000–2007 | orchestra and electronics | 18 min. |
| VII; Mysterium | Alkere | 2002–2013 | prepared piano | 12 min. |
| VII; Mysterium | Monh | 2001–2005 | solo viola, orchestra and electronics | 23 min. |
| VII; Mysterium | Ingwe | 2003–2018 | electric guitar | 60 min. |
| VII; Mysterium | Jerusalem (after Blake) | 2011–2016 | orchestra and electronics | 21 min. |
| VII; Mysterium | String Quartet(s) | 2000–2023 | pre-recorded digital string quartet (in collaboration with The Noise) / 4-channel sound installation for permanent projection in the Cobar Sound Chapel | ca. 43 hours |
| VII; Mysterium | "...to beam in distant heavens..." – Violin Concerto | 2018–2023 | solo violin and orchestra | 35 min. |
| VII; Mysterium | Anyente | 2019–2024 | viola | 10 min. |

== Recordings ==
"Caeli enarrant..." III, "Caeli enarrant..." IV, Birrung & Nguurraa

Ensemble 24 / Matthew Coorey

Ingwe

Zane Banks

Ngangkar & Guyuhmgan

Sydney Symphony Orchestra / Edo de Waart, ABC Classics

Ngangkar, Guyuhmgan & Monh

Tabea Zimmermann / Orchestre Philharmonique du Luxembourg / Emilio Pomarico

== Awards ==
- Paul Lowin Orchestral Prize 1997 – "Caeli enarrant..." I
- UNESCO International Rostrum of Composers, Paris, 2002: Top Recommended Composition – Guyuhmgan
- APRA Awards of 2009: Best Composition by an Australian Composer – Monh
