= String Quartet(s) =

Digital composition by Georges Lentz

String Quartet(s) (2000–2023) is a digital four-channel surround-sound composition by Luxembourg-Australian composer Georges Lentz. It is over 43 hours long and plays constantly, day and night, in its permanent sound installation setting, the Cobar Sound Chapel in remote Outback New South Wales, Australia.

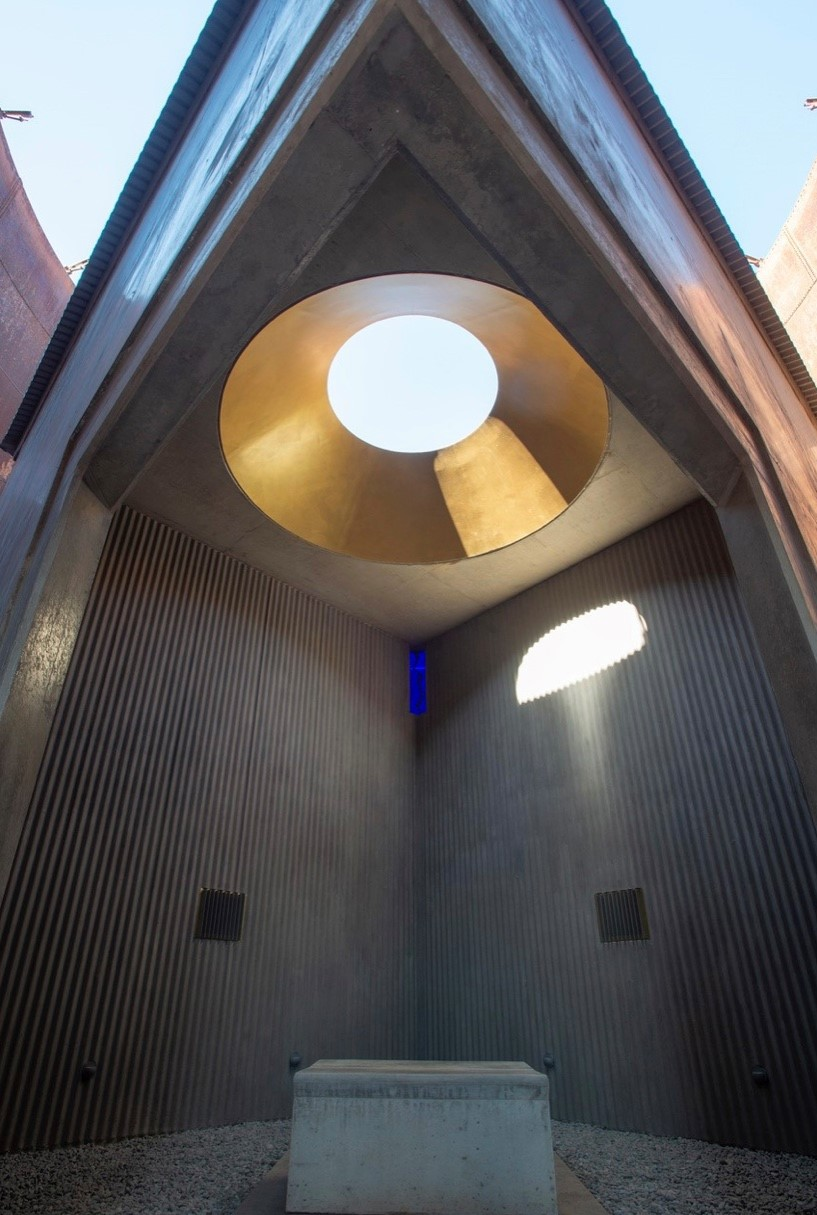
Cobar Sound Chapel, interior

== Background ==
The composer started writing string quartet fragments from the early 2000s over many years. This music was then developed during extensive recording sessions between 2008 and 2020 in collaboration with the Sydney-based string quartet The Noise. The recordings included both notated music and free and guided improvisation, in both acoustic sound and with feedback pedals.

== Structure ==
String Quartet(s) is structured around predominantly sparse musical textures with many thousands of tiny musical dots (delicate short notes) that suggest "a starry night sky" (Lentz) and form the context for some hugely dramatic, complex musical clusters which emerge from and are embedded in this meditative backdrop.

== Techniques, themes and influences ==
Over its vast duration, the music develops and varies a number of musical tropes, such as a star-like glitter, bird-like and insect-like sounds, musical unisons, quasi-tonal chorales, digital glitches and drones, long build-ups of string sound, a rumble reminiscent of trains or of planes passing by in the distance, electronic distortions of the acoustic sound, modernist avant-garde gestures, noise music, multi-layered as well as very sparse textures, industrial as well as serene sounds, long haunting solo passages for the individual instruments (especially the viola), dripping water sounds, techno-like beats, layered spoken text, hiss, cuts, loops etc... - all of which is punctuated again and again by periods of silence. The music constantly varies or modifies these musical tropes, without ever repeating them in an identical way.

The overall effect is of a giant musical meditation which pulses, shimmers, glitters and fluctuates between mainly sparse time spans and sporadic centres of dense musical activity, and which connects the listener to the vastness of the land, nature and sky of its remote Outback environment, as well as to the vast sparseness of boundless outer space.

String Quartet(s) is influenced by Lentz's reading of the epic poem Jerusalem: The Emanation of the Giant Albion by William Blake (a quote from the poem can be found inscribed in the Cobar Sound Chapel's north-eastern wall) -

There is a Void, outside of Existence,
Which if enter'd into
Englobes itself & becomes a Womb

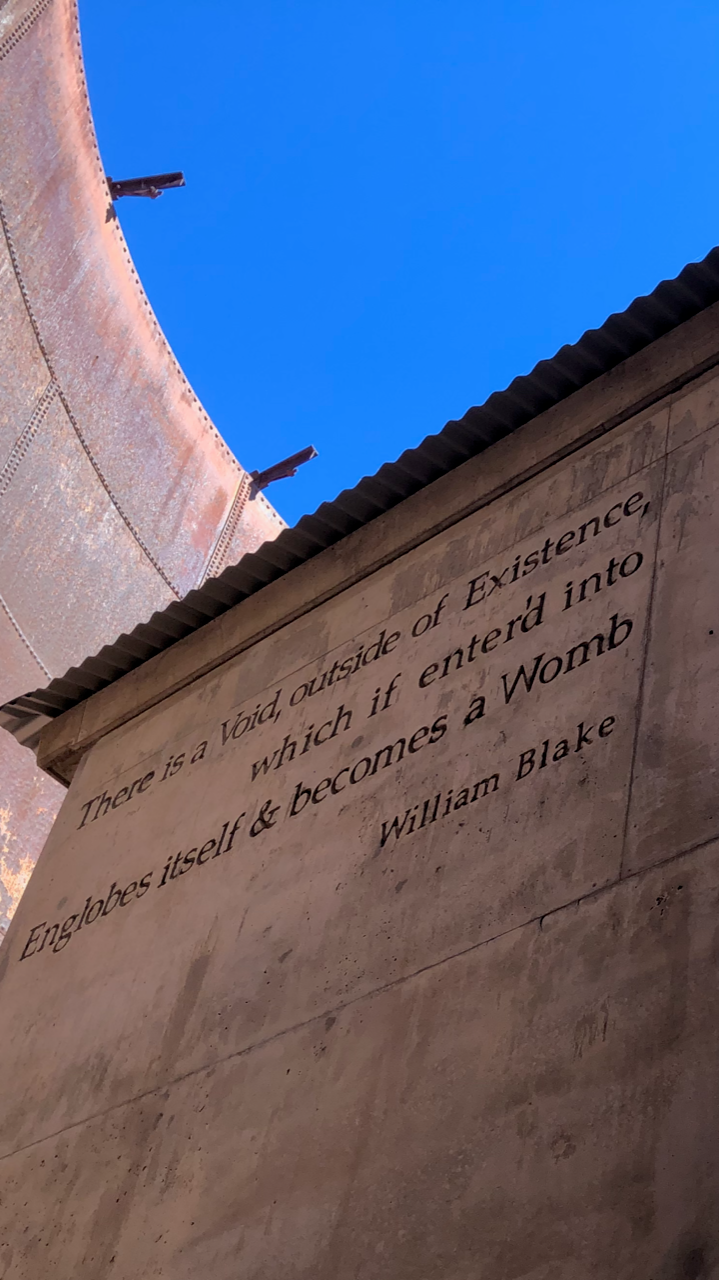
Inscription in the north-eastern wall of the Cobar Sound Chapel.

Some of the more active sections of the composition have an almost "apocalyptic" slant to them, in keeping with Blake's Jerusalem, and the composer has written about trying to "render the music of Blake's poem". He also speaks about the work being akin to "a vast canvas filled with audio graffiti".

The number 4 is an overarching feature of String Quartet(s), as it is of the Cobar Sound Chapel architecture by renowned architect Glenn Murcutt which houses the composition. The rhythmical proportions of 1/4/16 (or semibreves, crotchets and semiquavers in musical terms) is central to the music. String Quartet(s) is heard through four loudspeakers, which themselves often feature four musical lines each, or even four superimposed quartets. Thus the music, to the listener sitting on the Sound Chapel's central concrete plinth, consists of anything from silence or a single musical line to quartets within quartets within quartets.

According to Lentz, the process of recording itself became one of the central concerns of the composition and anything from high-end professional equipment to a tinny smartphone was used. Very different acoustics and distances to the microphone were also explored and thus dry close-up sounds and highly resonant music are sometimes heard over the top of each other, giving the impression of "chambers within chambers" (according to British musicologist Tim Rutherford-Johnson in the album booklet) or different perspectives at the same time.

== Influence of AI ==
The composer speaks of experimenting with "simple" AI tools in minor parts of the composition. More generally, he writes about "especially in the visual arts, (having) been impressed with some AI-generated material that I sensed was actually starting to produce results which I felt humans had not achieved in quite the same way. This led me to imagine an awe-inspiring musical AI that might be truly creative, and I found myself musing about what such an AI might sound like - in other words, I found myself imitating AI, rather than it imitating me!" Lentz writes about this approach turning "into one of the overarching drivers behind the creation of String Quartet(s)".

In June 2025, an audio-only conversation between Lentz and ChatGPT-4 about music and AI, recorded the previous month in the remoteness of the Australian Outback, was released on YouTube. It includes music from String Quartet(s) and talks about it amongst other topics.

== Indigenous inspiration and collaboration ==
Lentz's love of Australian Aboriginal art, especially the work of Kathleen Petyarre and within her work one painting in particular with innumerable tiny dots, is also a major inspiration behind String Quartet(s), as it is behind much of the composer's music. A four-part glass artwork in the Cobar Sound Chapel's blue corner windows by local Indigenous artist Sharron Ohlsen features winding vertical dots which, according to the composer, are also "in dialogue with" the starry dots found in the sound art.

== Recording ==
A stereo version of part of the music was released on the KAIROS label in late 2024.

== Reception ==
String Quartet(s) has been praised by music critics as "astonishing music" for its scope and ambition through its "huge and dynamic sonic architecture". It has been described as "ethereal..., a musical chamber for marvelling at the universe" (New York Times) and Lentz's "masterpiece".

Reviewing the 2024 album of String Quartet(s) on the Austrian KAIROS label, Dutch musicologist C. Cornell Evers praises its "seemingly endless vistas which alternate with ethereal, transparent meditations and improvisational explorations. The complex interplay of space, time and sonic textures offers a profound and immersive, even mystical, experience."

Italian musicologist Ettore Garzia finds the music "tremendously fascinating and bracing; there is an infatuation with the 'sublime' that the composer tries by all possible emotional means to transfer into music (which is) ... highly refined and lending itself to many interpretations". He describes it as "belonging very much to our time".

Michael Bleby in the Australian Financial Review describes it as being "more electronica than classical", as "mixing the high- and lowbrow" and refers to the "symmetry" of the composition through its connections to the number 4. This is picked up by British musicologist Tim Rutherford-Johnson who talks about the "long-standing idiosyncrasy of Lentz's music of dividing time into similar quartered proportions... to create rhythms that reveal unexpected openings across a regular surface... Is String Quartet(s) a wormhole to the Australian outback? A palimpsest of elsewheres and elsewhens? A spiritual fiction? ... The music is both porous and resistant, contained and uncontainable, disturbing - yet magnificent."
