= Auditory imagery =

Form of mental imagery

Auditory imagery is a form of mental imagery that is used to organize and analyze sounds when there is no external auditory stimulus present. This form of imagery is broken up into a couple of auditory modalities such as verbal imagery or musical imagery. This modality of mental imagery differs from other sensory images such as motor imagery or visual imagery. The vividness and detail of auditory imagery can vary from person to person depending on their background and condition of their brain. Through all of the research developed to understand auditory imagery behavioral neuroscientists have found that the auditory images developed in subjects' minds are generated in real time and consist of fairly precise information about quantifiable auditory properties as well as melodic and harmonic relationships. These studies have been able to recently gain confirmation and recognition due to the arrival of Positron emission tomography and fMRI scans that can confirm a physiological and psychological correlation.

== Audio properties ==
=== Tempo ===
The accuracy of tempo within an auditory image usually suffers when recalled; however, the consistency of a person's perception of tempo is preserved. When surveying subject's auditory imagery, their sense of tempo usually stays within 8% of the original tempo heard in a song that the subject heard at some point in the past. This was shown by having subjects compare the pitch of two words in a song. For instance, people can sing through "Jingle Bells" in their head and determine if there is a difference in pitch between the word 'Snow' and 'Sleigh'. Experiments like this have shown it takes longer to compare the pitches of two words if the space between the two words is larger. Therefore, the tempo structure of the melody is preserved in the auditory image. However, if someone had musical training then the person has more flexibility in his or her auditory imagery tempo representations.

=== Pitch ===
Humans retain a relatively strong auditory image for details in pitch, which can be improved with musical training. The development of cultivating an auditory image with absolute pitch, which is being able to determine a note upon hearing a sound, however, is dependent on childhood musical training and genetic factors. People are able to improve their discrimination of pitch; however, they cannot improve their detection. Auditory image pitch detection studies have shown that response time decreases when judging two high pitches as opposed to judging two low pitches. There has been an assumption about the link between auditory imagery and performance, which is related to the reports of accurate singers experiencing vivid auditory imagery. Although, no studies have related vocal pitch imitation to the accuracy of formation of auditory images.

=== Loudness ===
Of the many aspects of sound, loudness is a characteristic of auditory imagery that is usually lost or impaired. This is evident when people attempt to image a song and there is little noticeable volume dynamics in the auditory image. According to Pitt and Crowder, the encoding of loudness into our auditory imagery was shown to have little correlation with any physiological neural factors. Other scientists such as Intons-Petersons believe that there is encoding for loudness in our auditory images and that if so, it most likely occurs in a person's motor cortex. An experiment was done to determine whether imagined auditory representations contain loudness information. Wu states, "It was found that the amplitude of the imagery-related late positive complex (LPC) decreased with pitch but increased with loudness of the imagined sound, which was consistent with amplitude modulations of the auditory perception-related N1 component, thereby providing the first neural evidence that auditory imagery encodes perceptual attributes of auditory experiences."

=== Verbal ===
The auditory imagery developed from lyrics or words generally is also considered a part of inner speech. When people image their voice or the voices of others it is considered inner speech but some researchers argue that it is a lack of self-monitoring of speech. This generally refers to imagining speech which can occur when trying to remember what someone said or the sound of their voice which can be elicited voluntarily or involuntarily. Auditory verbal imagery is considered useful for practicing and organizing things people would like to say in person. For instance, practicing a speech or getting ready to sing a part in a song.

=== Perception ===
A study was conducted to explore the neural representation during imagery and perception of sounds by using magnetic resonance. In the study, univariate and multivariate analyses found distinct representation between auditory imagery and perception in the overlapping regions, including superior temporal gyrus and inferior frontal sulcus as well as the precentral cortex and pre-supplementary motor area.

== Physiology ==
=== Auditory imagery ===
Cognitive scientists are very interested in finding out what brain structures are involved with mental imaging in order to provide consistent, localized, and more tangible evidence. It has been established that auditory imagery makes use of the right lobe since people with right lobe lesions tend to have difficulty generating auditory images. This is because auditory imaging requires the usage of the frontal and superior temporal right lobe as well as a lot of the right auditory association cortices. These portions of the brain are usually involved with interpreting the inflections of sounds (such as sad or angry sounds).

The supplementary motor area is also involved in image generation and encodes motor processes to do, while the right thalamus is hypothesized to be a part of auditory image retrieval. The activation of the supplementary motor area is also relevant since it is a portion of the brain that is involved when a motor task is imagined as opposed to overly executed. This shows that developing an auditory image is partially a motor task.

During auditory verbal imagery, the inferior frontal cortex and the insula were activated as well as the supplementary motor area, left superior temporal/inferior parietal region, the right posterior cerebellar cortex, the left precentral, and superior temporal gyri. Other areas of the brain have been activated during auditory imagery however there hasn't been an encoding process attributed to it yet such as frontopolar areas, and the subcallosal gyrus.

=== Anticipatory imagery ===
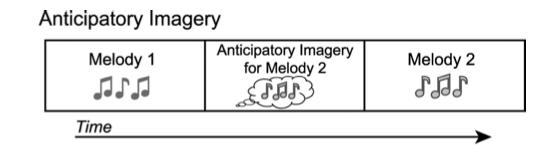
When people receive auditory input an auditory image is developed. As the associations with pieces of organized sound become stronger and more intricate, the silence involved in the sound can initiate auditory images in the brain.

As associations between pieces of sound such as music or repetitive dialogue become stronger and more complex even the silence involved in the sound can initiate auditory images in the brain. Studies have been done in which people listen to a CD over and over with silence in between tracks and the neural activity was analyzed using fMRI. It was consistently found the prefrontal cortex and premotor cortical areas were active during the anticipation of auditory imagery. The caudal PFC was used a lot during the early stages of learning of the song while in later stages the rostral PFC was used more indicating a shift in the cortex regions used during auditory imaging association. Studies suggest sub vocalization may be a factor in anticipatory auditory imagery. The study proved that singers with less accuracy show greater laryngeal activity during auditory imagery than singers who showed accuracy.

== Image perception ==
=== Musical training and experience ===
Musical training has consistently shown to be a powerful way to refine auditory imagery enabling people to discern and manipulate various characteristics of sound such as pitch, timbre, tempo, etc. Musical training can cause localized networks of neurons to fire synchronously a lot more easily through spatial temporal firing patterns (Hebbian theory), which may explain why non-musical auditory imagery is enhanced in musically trained subjects. For musically naïve people, music is mainly an external experience. Naïve people are significantly worse than highly trained individuals on all auditory imagery tasks. Auditory imagery was accessed in 14 pianists to examine the relationship between individual differences and temporal coordination in piano duos. There were given a task of producing rhythmic sequences with or without auditory feedback. The feedback suggested that coordination was not affected much by the visual contact they had but more by individual anticipatory auditory imagery. The findings suggest "auditory imagery facilitates interpersonal coordination by enhancing the operation of internal models that simulate one's own and others' actions during ensemble performance."

=== Difference in vividness ===
Even though subjects can't confuse an auditory image as a perceived sound some people may experience very vivid auditory images. The difference in vividness from person to person can be an important neuronal correlation of sensory processes and higher-order cognition. The Bucknell Auditory Imagery Score assesses the vividness of a person's auditory imagery and was shown to correlate directly with the neuronal activity of the superior temporal gyrus as well as the prefrontal cortex. Musical training does not produce an improvement in the vividness of auditory images however data showing if vividness can be improved or a circuit dedicated to vividness has shown to be inconclusive.

=== Dreaming ===
There have been a few studies conducted concerning auditory imagery generated in subjects during dreaming. There are different kinds of auditory imagery people experience in their dreams when waking up from rapid eye movement sleep. Auditory imagery is generally fairly common in rapid eye movement sleep with the majority of it being verbal auditory imagery. Studies found that the last auditory images in a dream are usually words spoken by the self-character in the dream. Some findings concerning the dream auditory imagery in patients with brain lesions and children's dreams have been done as well but are more speculative. Windt developed a "conceptual framework describing not only what it means to say that dreams are conscious experiences but also how to locate dreams relative to such concepts as perception, hallucination, and imagination, as well as thinking, knowledge, belief, deception, and self-consciousness."

=== Notational audiation ===
There is a lot of anecdotal evidence that reading musical notation can cause musicians to sense an auditory image of the notes they are reading which is a phenomenon called notational audiation. Present studies show that only some musicians who can read musical notation can hear an inner voice emulating the melody while reading the notation which has served as an interesting mode of study to understand the way information is encoded in the brain. Musicians have their sense of notational audiation significantly impaired during phonatory distractions due to the conflicting signals induced onto a single sensory modality. Some musicians who are proficient at reading sheet music may experience an auditory image while reading over the excerpt for Symphony No. 40 from Mozart below.

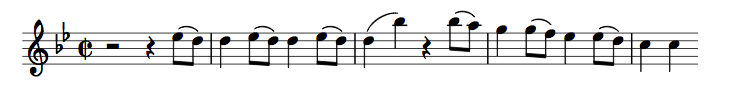

=== Schizophrenia ===
Schizophrenic patients have a weakened sense of reality and how to respond to reality. Moreover, 60% of patients with schizophrenia are hypothesized to have a much more vivid sense of auditory imagery. When normal subjects and schizophrenic subjects were both asked to generate an auditory image, schizophrenic patients were shown to have a much weaker activation of the posterior cerebral cortex, hippocampi, bilateral lenticular nuclei, right thalamus, middle and superior cortex, and left nucleus accumbens. These areas are important to inner speech and verbal self-monitoring which may explain why schizophrenia is more likely to induce auditory hallucinations. These auditory hallucinations differ from an internal monologue which is usually imagined in the first person. The hallucinations on the other hand are imagined in the second and third person which is speculated to be caused by increased activity in the left premotor, middle temporal and inferior parietal cortex, and supplementary motor area during second or third person imagery.

== Implications and research directions ==
Studies on auditory imagery can give insight to involuntary intrusive images called earworms. One study used to examine control of auditory imagery experiences is the self report Bucknell Auditory Imagery Scale. A relatable phenomenon in which the lay person has experienced an earworm is when a jingle gets stuck in a person's head. However, some people with obsessive compulsive disorder may have stubborn earworms that stay for a much longer period of time on the order of years in which research in auditory imagery may be able to salvage them and get rid of their auditory image. In a study by Zvyagintsev, subjects were asked to imagine a familiar melody and were asked for vividness rating while having an MRI session. This showed that it was difficult to separate memory and imagination.

These studies are important for psychologists who want to understand how human memory and musical cognition works. For most modes of memory, people do not spontaneously remember facts or ideas throughout their day unless it is pressing to their current situation, however auditory imagery can spontaneously and constantly occur to people so evidence tells that this mode of memory differs from others. For instance, the auditory images that are remembered are usually 10–20 seconds long, however remembering facts or scenes do not necessarily hold time stamps like auditory images do. This insight would hold relevance on understanding the relationship of music and memory. Auditory imagery can be studied using tonal stimuli. During this study, people's abilities will be assessed to determine if they are capable of creating their own imagery. For example, they could be asked whether a probe tone matches a pitch or if they could use continuation to fill in the missing pieces.

Moreover, musicians and music educators may be able to lessen the amount of practice they have to physically do by honing their auditory imagery due to the refinement of auditory discrimination and organization. By improving a person's ability to manipulate their 'inner ear' and concept of auditory images they can learn and play music better on a shorter time scale with less effort.

== See also ==
- Audiation
