= Cobar Sound Chapel =

Art installation in Australia

Coordinates: 31°29′18″S 145°48′41″E

The Cobar Sound Chapel is a permanent site-specific sound installation, located 1.5 km west of the town of Cobar, in Outback New South Wales, Australia.

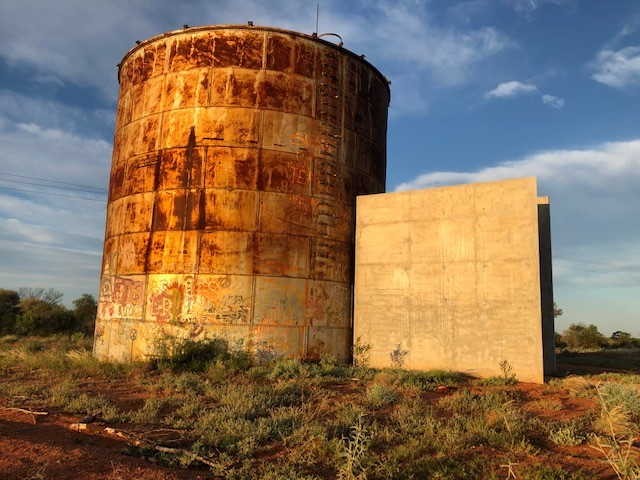
Cobar Sound Chapel, exterior view looking west

It is a multi-disciplinary artwork created by composer and sound artist Georges Lentz in collaboration with architect Glenn Murcutt. The Cobar Sound Chapel consists of a five metre concrete cube with an oculus in its ceiling and with loudspeakers in its four walls, cast in situ inside a ten metre tall disused water tank from 1901, and with a pair of 5-by-5-metre entrance walls leading into the tank.

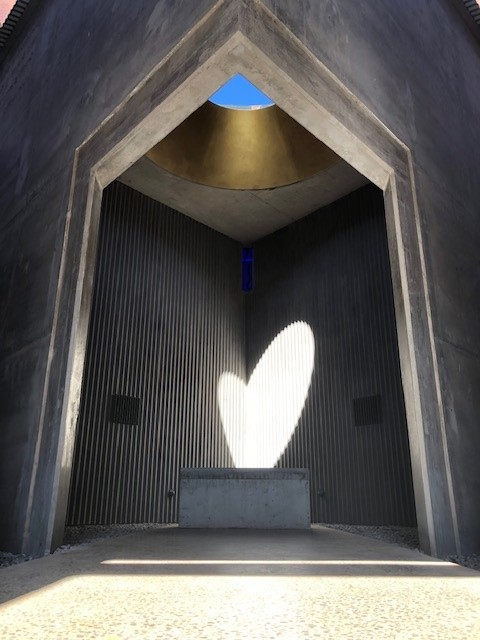
Cobar Sound Chapel, interior view

The Cobar Sound Chapel is the new permanent home of Lentz's digital 43-hour surround-sound "String Quartet(s)" (2000–2023), a composition recorded over many years by Sydney string quartet The Noise. The music is inspired by the outback landscape and its starry night skies. Its vast sound art canvas spills out of the tank day and night, with the inside of the tank visible from outside through a pair of steel gates and dimly lit up at night. Other influences of the artwork include aboriginal dot painting, the art and poetry of William Blake, the graffiti found on the tank's walls, as well as, in some parts, an exploration of AI-generated sound. The Cobar Sound Chapel also includes art in its blue corner windows, created by Cobar Indigenous artist Sharron Ohlsen.

According to composer Georges Lentz, the whole Cobar Sound Chapel is music, a giant "digital string quartet", and there are relationships between the proportions of the building and rhythmic patterns found in the music.

The Cobar Sound Chapel, twenty years in the making, officially opened on April 2, 2022.

== Gallery ==
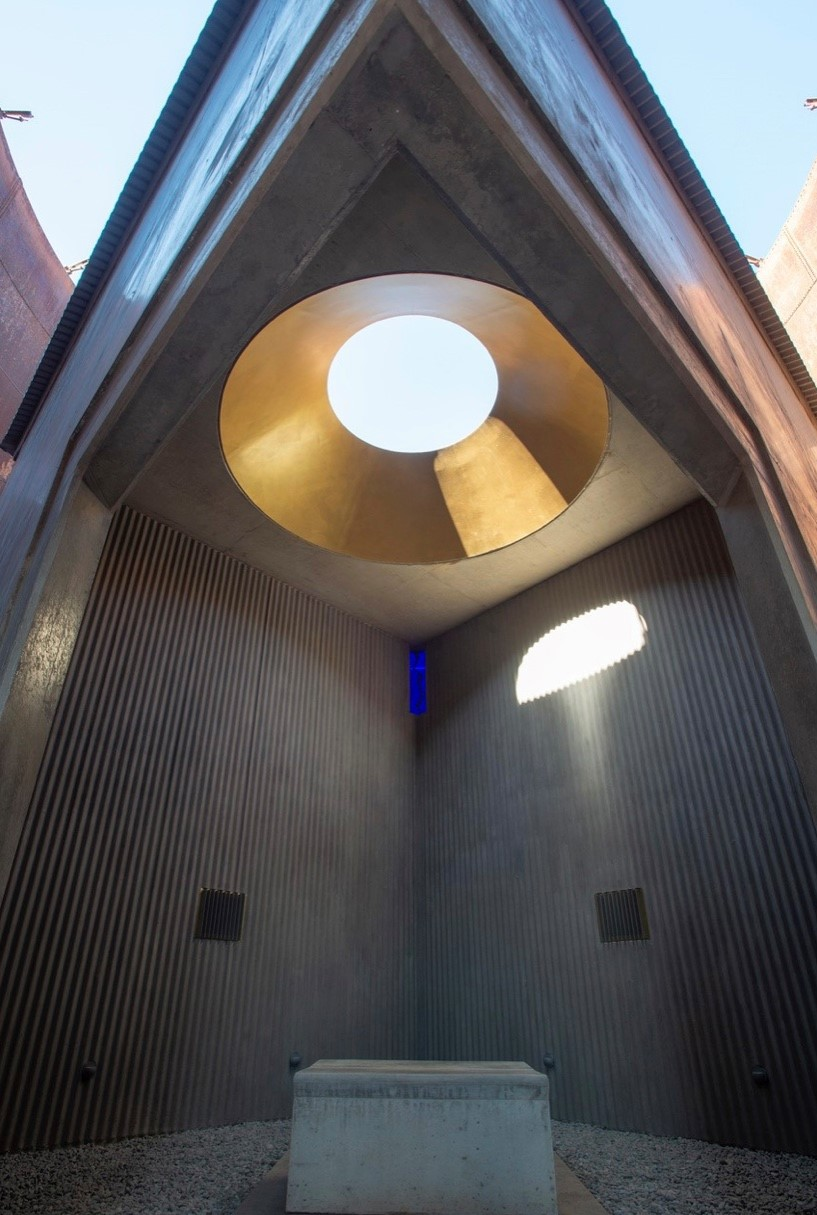
Interior, looking south

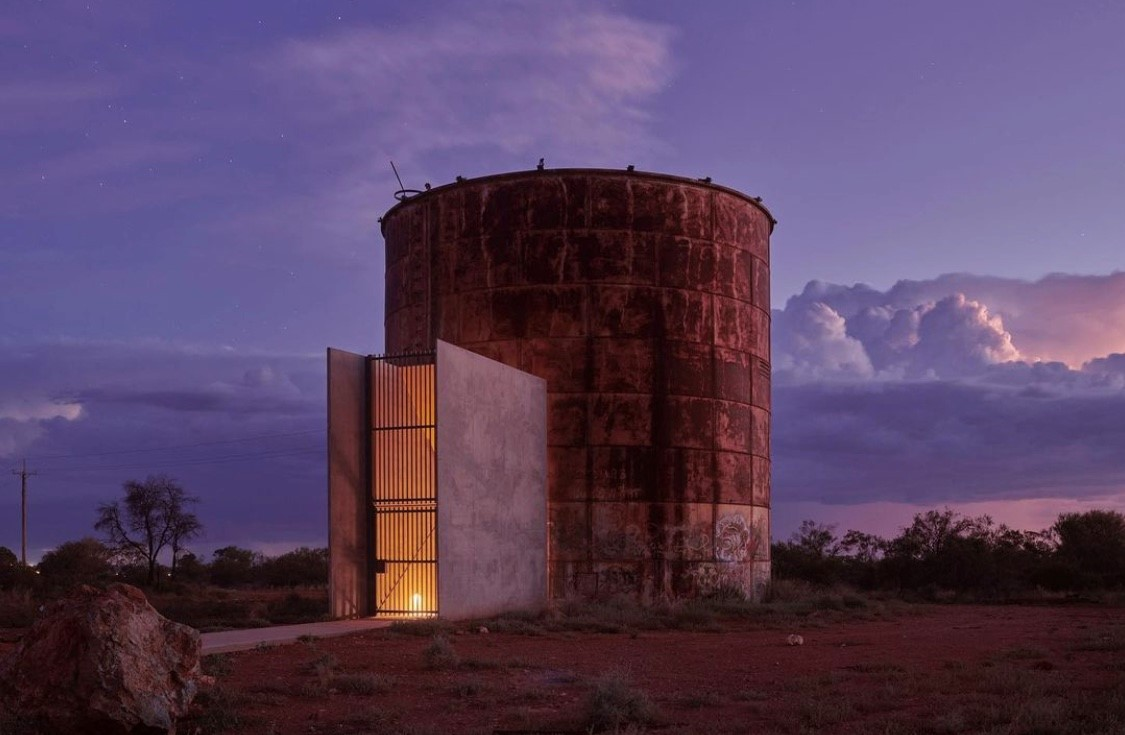
Chapel at nightfall, looking south-east

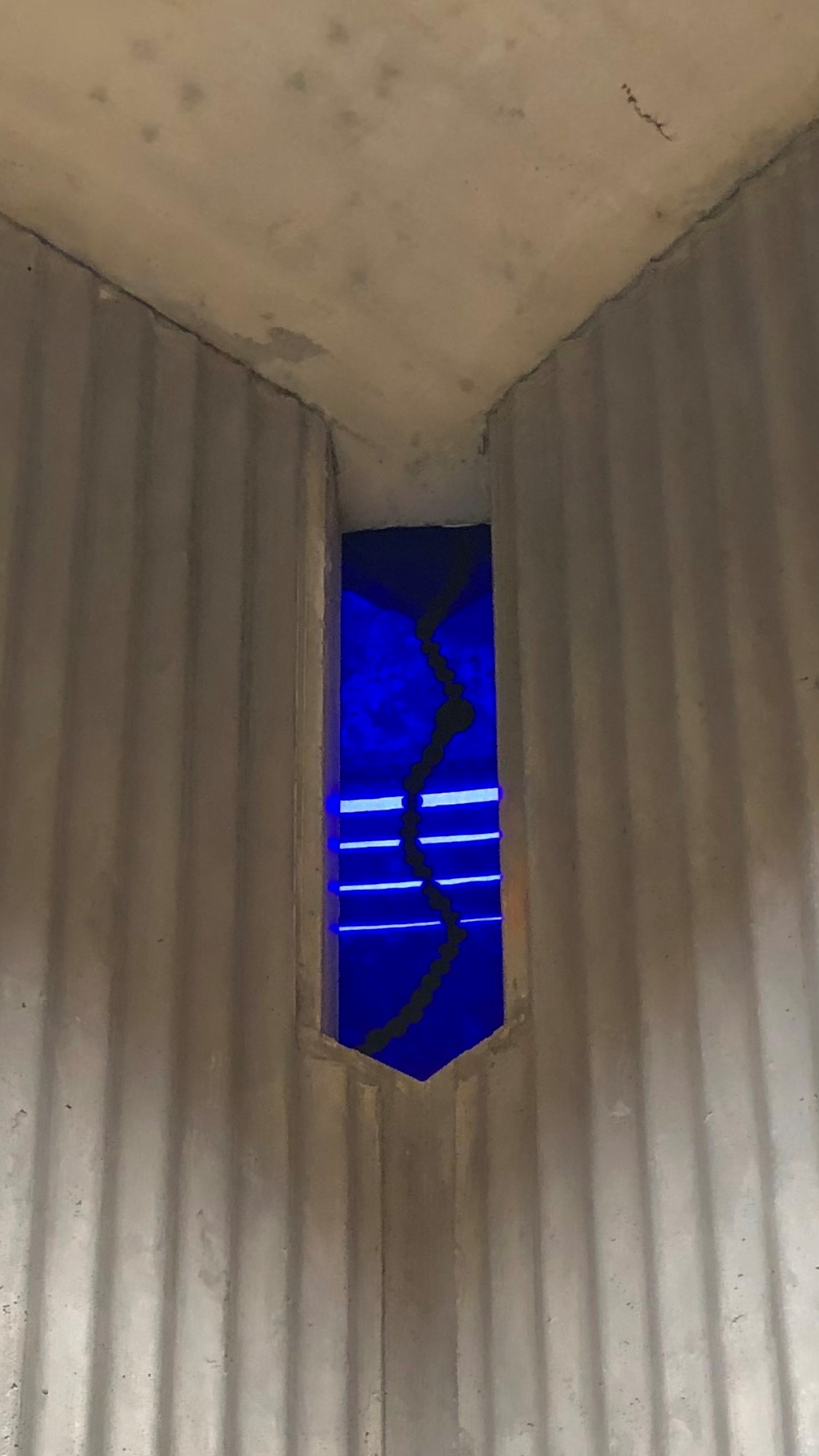
Western window

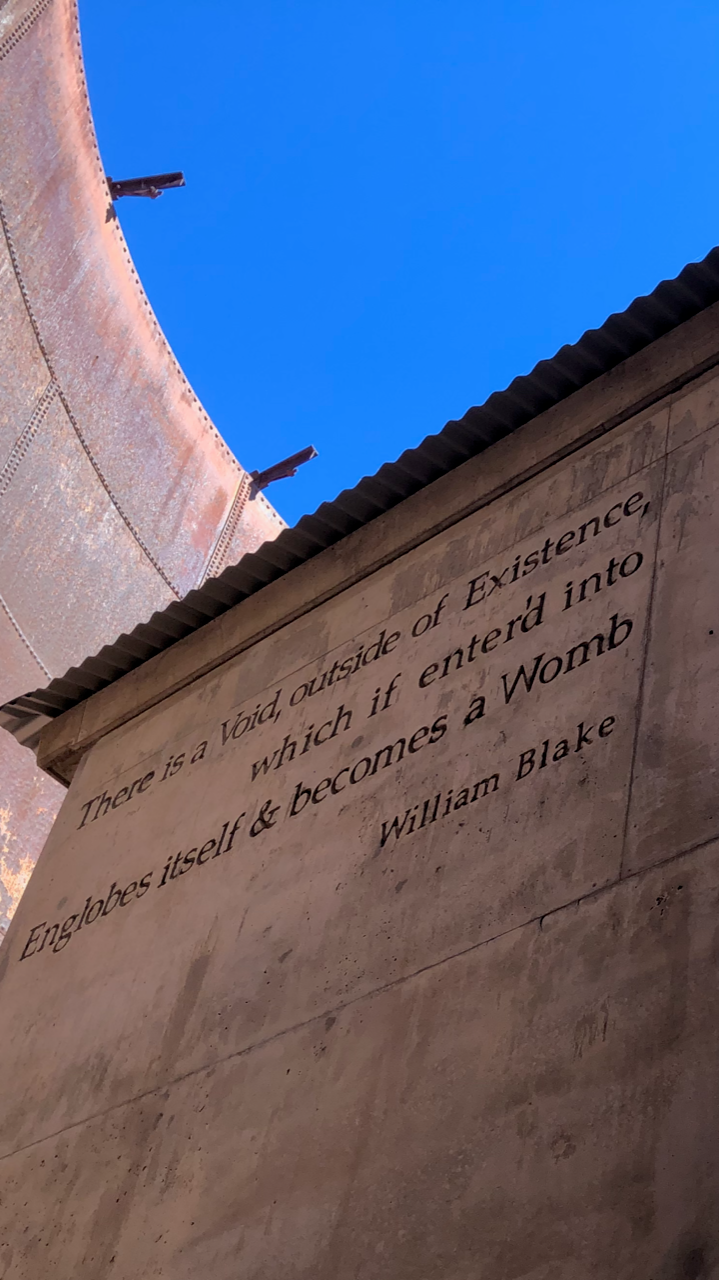
Blake inscription in the north-eastern wall

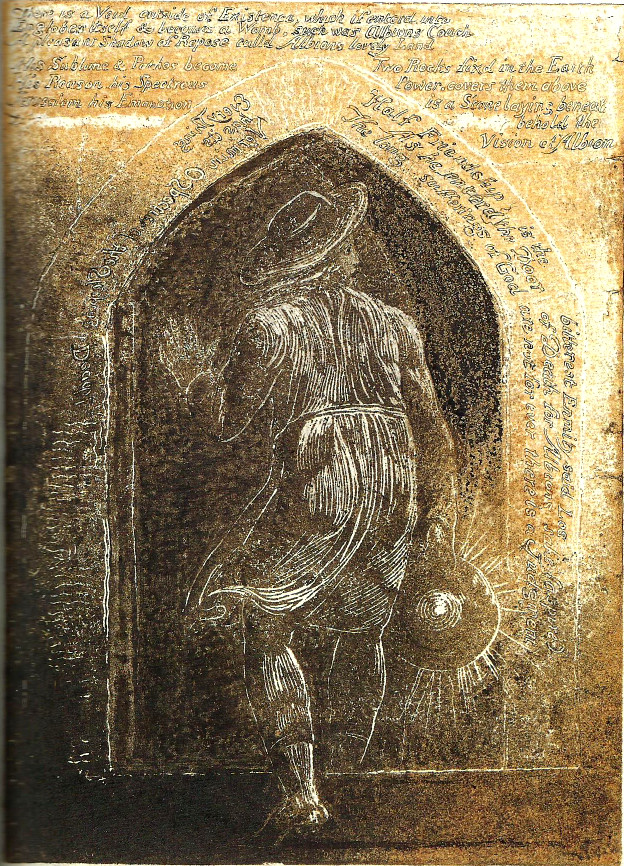
The first plate of Jerusalem by Blake, with text of inscription
