= The Noise (string quartet) =

Experimental string quartet from Sydney, Australia

- Origin: Sydney, Australia
- Genres: Experimental; improvised music; folk; new music; alternative rock
- Years active: 2006–present
- Members: Veronique Serret (violin); Mirabai Peart (violin); James Eccles (viola); Oliver Miller (cello)
- Website: thenoise.com.au

The Noise are an experimental string quartet from Sydney, Australia, formed in 2006. The members are Veronique Serret and Mirabai Peart (violins), James Eccles (viola) and Oliver Miller (cello). They perform notated music, but specialize in live improvisation, often with effects pedals, in a number of musical genres and in reflection of the varied musical experience of the group's members. All four musicians are classically trained and have performed with the Australian Chamber Orchestra, Opera Australia and Pinchgut Opera, but their experience extends to world music, jazz, rock and alternative. The Noise's commitment to experimental New Music has seen the group record the 2013 album composed NOISE, consisting of all new string quartets with elements of improvisation by seven leading Australian composers including Andrew Ford and Rosalind Page. Their 2015 release Stream was a double album consisting of all improvised material, which just like composed NOISE received four-star reviews in the Sydney Morning Herald, with SMH jazz critic John Shand describing the aesthetic as "...melodic, evocative, starkly beautiful... and coher[ing] with sometimes uncanny precision...". An album of Georges Lentz's composition String Quartet(s), on which The Noise collaborated, was released in 2024.
