= Mind–body interventions =

Health and fitness interventions

Mind–body interventions (MBI) or mind-body training (MBT) are health and fitness interventions that are intended to work on a physical and mental level such as yoga, tai chi, and Pilates.

The category was introduced in September 2000 by the United States National Center for Complementary and Integrative Health (NCCIH), a government agency, and encompasses alternative medicine interventions. It excludes scientifically validated practices such as cognitive behavioral therapy. Cochrane reviews have found that studies in this area are small and have low scientific validity.

Since 2008, authors documenting research conducted on behalf of the NCCIH have used terms mind and body practices and mind-body medicine interchangeably with mind-body intervention to denote therapies, as well as physical and mental rehabilitative practices, which "focus on the relationships between the brain, mind, body, and behavior, and their effect on health and disease." According to the NCCIH, "mind and body practices include a large and diverse group of procedures or techniques administered or taught by a trained practitioner or teacher".

== Definitions ==
The United States National Center for Complementary and Integrative Health (NCCIH) defines mind-body interventions as activities that purposefully affect mental and physical fitness, listing activities such as yoga, tai chi, pilates, guided imagery, guided meditation and forms of meditative praxis, hypnosis, hypnotherapy, and prayer, as well as art therapy, music therapy, and dance therapy.

The Cochrane Library contains 3 systematic reviews that explicitly cite and define MBI as MBT. The reviews consider biofeedback, mindfulness, autogenic training, hypnotherapy, imagery, meditation, and prayer as MBT despite them focusing more strictly on the mind.

One review uses a narrower definition, defining MBT as an 'active' intervention in which mental and physical exercises are alternated. A web search will yield mentions of mind-body training in offerings of entities that give yoga, pilates, or meditation training, but explicit definitions are rare.

== Origins and history ==
Western MBI was popularized in the early 20th century but dates back to Ancient Greece. The Greek values of strength and beauty in combination with Greek mythology led to activities intended to promote confidence.

Eastern MBI in the form of yoga originated in Ancient India and has been around since at least 500 BCE and possibly as early as 3300 BCE.

A renewed interest developed in mind-body work in the late 19th and early 20th century. Possibly due to visits from yoga gurus and increased interest, some medical practitioners and movement specialists developed movement therapies with a deliberate mental focus.

Two prominent names in modern mind-body training are Joseph Pilates (1880–1967) and Margaret Morris (1891–1980). A famous statement of Joseph Pilates was "Physical fitness is the first requisite of happiness." Margaret Morris had a background in dance and claimed a connection between a free dance and a free mind.

== In conventional medicine ==
All mind-body interventions focus on the interaction between the brain, body, and behavior and are practiced with intention to use the mind to alter physical function and promote overall health and well-being.

However, the NCCIH does not consider mind-body interventions as within the purview of complementary and alternative medicine when there is sufficient scientific evidence for the benefit of such practices along with their professional application in conventional medicine. Cognitive behavioral therapy is defined by the NCCIH as a mind-body intervention because it utilizes the mind's capacity to affect bodily function and symptoms, but also there is sufficient scientific evidence and mainstream application for it to fall outside the purview of complementary and alternative medicine.

== Evidence for efficacy ==
Most studies of MBI and related techniques are small and have low scientific validity, a finding that dominates many Cochrane Reviews. Some of the individual studies do show positive results, but this may be due to chance or placebo effects and the significance may diminish when groups are randomized.

Proponents of MBI techniques suggest that a rationale for mind-body training is that the mind follows the body and the body follows the mind. The body-mind connection can be attributed to hormones and chemicals released during movement, although the mind-body connection is dominated by the brain and is considered to be more of a neurological mechanism. There are some indications that movement complexity may have an impact on brain development.

When it comes to explicitly alternating mental and physical exercise sections, proponents rationalize that physical activity induces an elevated heart-rate and increases in stress, which mimics conditions in which athletes need their mental skills the most. It is believed that these conditions make training more functional and there is some limited scientific evidence supporting effectiveness because of this type of approach.

There are documented benefits of several mind-body interventions derived from scientific research: first, by MBI use contributing to the treatment a range of conditions including headaches, coronary artery disease and chronic pain; second, in ameliorating disease and the symptoms of chemotherapy-induced nausea, vomiting, and localized physical pain in patients with cancer; third, in increasing the perceived capacity to cope with significant problems and challenges; and fourth, in improving the reported overall quality of life. In addition, there is evidence supporting the brain and central nervous system's influence on the immune system and the capacity for mind-body interventions to enhance immune function outcomes, including defense against and recovery from infection and disease.

Side effects are rarely reported in mind-body training. Some studies have indicated that meditation can have undesired adverse effects on specific clinical populations (e.g., people with a history of PTSD), although these are smaller studies.

There is limited high-quality evidence as well with regard to the effect of intensity and duration. In a small study observing 87 healthy female participants undergoing either mind-body training or no training, participants who actively participated in an online program showed significantly greater resilience toward stress, anger, anxiety, and depression at 8 weeks than at 4 weeks into the study. However, this study was not randomized and the placebo effect may be large on the subjective psychological test scores. Recent meta-analyses of randomized controlled trials (RTCs) confirmed the efficacy of smartphone interventions for mental health problems, including depression, anxiety, and stress.

== Popularity ==
Mind–body interventions are the most commonly used form of complementary and alternative medicine in the United States, with yoga and meditation being the most popular forms.

== See also ==
- Acupuncture – Pseudoscientific needling treatment
- Alexander technique – Postural awareness technique
- Art therapy – Creation of art to improve mental health
- Autosuggestion – Psychological technique related to the placebo effect
- Breathing exercises – Breathing exercises
- Bodywork (alternative medicine) – Any alternative therapy involving physically working with the body
- Chiropractic – Form of pseudoscientific alternative medicine
- Dance therapy – Psychotherapeutic use of movement and dance
- Guided imagery – Mind-body therapy
- Guided meditation – Techniques to train attention and awareness
- Hypnosis – State of increased suggestibility
- Hypnotherapy – Type of complementary and alternative medicine
- Massage therapy – Manual kneading of the body's soft tissues
- Meditation – Techniques to train attention and awareness
- Medicus curat, natura sanat – Medical aphorism ("the physician treats, nature heals")
- Mind–body dualism – Philosophical view that consiousness and the body are fundamentally different
- Mindfulness-Oriented Recovery Enhancement – Mind-body therapy program
- Music therapy – Health profession
- Osteopathic manipulation – Pseudoscientific alternative medicine emphasizing muscle and bone manipulation
- Pilates – Physical fitness system]
- Prayer – Invocation or act that seeks to activate a rapport with a deity
- Progressive muscle relaxation – Muscle relaxation technique
- Psychoneuroimmunology – Area of study within psychosomatic medicine
- Psychosomatic medicine – Interdisciplinary medical field exploring various influences on bodily processes
- Qigong – Chinese system of coordinated posture and movement, breathing, and meditation
- Rolfing – Form of alternative medicine
- Tai chi – Chinese martial art
- Tension and Trauma Releasing Exercises (TRE) – Body-based stress reduction method
- Trager approach – Form of somatic education
- Vis medicatrix naturae – Latin phrase affirming the body's self-healing nature
- Yoga – Spiritual practices from ancient India
