= O. Carl Simonton =

American physician

Oscar Carl Simonton
- Born: June 29, 1942; Los Angeles, California, U.S.
- Died: June 18, 2009 (aged 66); Agoura Hills, California, U.S.
- Education: University of Oregon
- Children: 4

O. Carl Simonton (June 29, 1942 – June 18, 2009) was a specialist in radiology and oncology most notable for his unproven cancer treatment methods.

== Career ==
He founded and directed the Simonton Cancer Center (SCC) in Malibu (USA) and was one of the pioneers of psycho-oncology. For over 30 years he worked with cancer patients who wanted to actively support their recovery process. Key elements of his philosophy and techniques affect the practical consulting work in the psycho-oncology in the United States, Europe and Japan.

== Criticism ==
Simonton was the author of the book Getting Well Again (1992). He claimed that cancer can be treated by relaxation and visualization techniques and that patients were healed using his methods. However, an investigation into five of his most impressive cases discovered that some of his patients had undergone standard treatment or probably did not have cancer to begin with. Medical health experts describe his therapy as dubious.

Physician Edward R. Friedlander, who investigated Simonton's techniques in depth, noted that although some patients found his approach helpful, his case histories are "very poor evidence" for the claim that his treatment controls tumours.

Psychologist Tomasz Witkowski devoted a whole chapter of his book Psychology Led Astray: Cargo Cult in Science and Therapy to Simonton and his method and concluded: "A deadly illness and its terminus are extreme situations; too difficult to be judged from the perspective of an outsider. However, when the process is joined by professionals, not only can we, but we should assess what they are doing. The effectiveness of psychotherapy according to the methods of O. Carl Simonton has, for almost forty years, not been verified in accordance with the standards applicable in science and medicine. The majority of trustworthy studies indicates that the descriptions of effectiveness in advertisements for the method are false. The sources invoked by its supporters do not account either for the position of the American Cancer Society, nor other critical studies(…)".

The American Cancer Society issued a statement entitled Unproven Methods of Cancer Management that summarized Simonton's methods by: "After careful study of the literature and other information available to it, the American Cancer Society does not have evidence that treatment with O. Carl Simonton's psychotherapy method results in objective benefit in the treatment of cancer in human beings".

== Publications ==
- Simonton, O.C. & Simonton S.S., "Belief Systems and Management of the Emotional Aspects of Malignancy, The Journal of Transpersonal Psychology, Vol.7, No.1, (January 1975), pp.29-47.
- Getting Well Again (1992)
- The Healing Journey (2002)

== Personal life ==
Simonton married Stephanie Matthews in 1973, who had two kids named Sheryl and Shannon before they divorced. Simonton later married Karen, who had two kids named Chase and Elizabeth.
