= Mental image =

Representation in the mind of objects, activities or events, whether they existed or not

In the philosophy of mind, neuroscience, and cognitive science, a mental image is an experience that, on most occasions, significantly resembles the experience of "perceiving" some object, event, or scene but occurs when the relevant object, event, or scene is not actually present to the senses. There are sometimes episodes, particularly on falling asleep (hypnagogic imagery) and waking up (hypnopompic imagery), when the mental imagery may be dynamic, phantasmagoric, and involuntary in character, repeatedly presenting identifiable objects or actions, spilling over from waking events, or defying perception, presenting a kaleidoscopic field, in which no distinct object can be discerned. Mental imagery can sometimes produce the same effects as would be produced by the behavior or experience imagined.

The nature of these experiences, what makes them possible, and their function (if any) have long been subjects of research and controversy in philosophy, psychology, cognitive science, and, more recently, neuroscience. As contemporary researchers use the expression, mental images or imagery can comprise information from any source of sensory input; one may experience auditory images, olfactory images, and so forth. However, the majority of philosophical and scientific investigations of the topic focus on visual mental imagery. It has sometimes been assumed that, like humans, some types of animals are capable of experiencing mental images. Due to the fundamentally introspective (reflective) nature of the phenomenon, it has been difficult to assess whether or not non-human animals experience mental imagery.

Philosophers such as George Berkeley and David Hume, and early experimental psychologists such as Wilhelm Wundt and William James, understood ideas in general to be mental images. Today, it is widely believed that much imagery functions as mental representations (or mental models), playing an important role in memory and thinking. William Brant (2013, p. 12) traces the scientific use of the phrase "mental images" back to John Tyndall's 1870 speech called the "Scientific Use of the Imagination". Some have suggested that images are best understood to be, by definition, a form of inner, mental, or neural representation. Others reject the view that the image experience may be identical with (or directly caused by) any such representation in the mind or the brain, but do not take account of the non-representational forms of imagery.

== Mind's eye ==
The notion of a "mind's eye" goes back at least to Cicero's reference to mentis oculi during his discussion of the orator's appropriate use of simile.

In this discussion, Cicero observed that allusions to "the Syrtis of his patrimony" and "the Charybdis of his possessions" involved similes that were "too far-fetched"; and he advised the orator to, instead, just speak of "the rock" and "the gulf" (respectively)—on the grounds that "the eyes of the mind are more easily directed to those objects which we have seen, than to those which we have only heard".

The concept of "the mind's eye" first appeared in English in Chaucer's (c. 1387) Man of Law's Tale in his Canterbury Tales, where he tells us that one of the three men dwelling in a castle was blind, and could only see with "the eyes of his mind"; namely, those eyes "with which all men see after they have become blind".

== Physical basis ==
The biological foundation of mental imagery is not fully understood. Studies using fMRI have shown that the lateral geniculate nucleus and the V1 area of the visual cortex are activated during mental imagery tasks. Ratey writes:

The visual pathway is not a one-way street. Higher areas of the brain can also send visual input back to neurons in lower areas of the visual cortex. [...] As humans, we have the ability to see with the mind's eye—to have a perceptual experience in the absence of visual input. For example, PET scans have shown that when subjects, seated in a room, imagine they are at their front door starting to walk either to the left or right, activation begins in the visual association cortex, the parietal cortex, and the prefrontal cortex—all higher cognitive processing centers of the brain.

Not all people have the same mental imagery ability. For some, when the eyes are closed, the perception of darkness prevails. However, some people are able to perceive colorful, dynamic imagery. The use of hallucinogenic drugs increases the subject's ability to consciously access mental imagery including synaestesia.

Furthermore, the pineal gland is a hypothetical candidate for producing a mind's eye. Rick Strassman and others have postulated that during near-death experiences (NDEs) and dreaming, the gland might secrete the hallucinogenic chemical dimethyltryptamine (DMT) to produce internal visuals when external sensory data is occluded. However, this hypothesis has yet to be fully supported with neurochemical evidence and plausible mechanism for DMT production.

The condition where a person lacks mental imagery is called aphantasia. The term was first suggested in a 2015 study.

Common examples of mental images include daydreaming and the mental visualization that occurs while reading a book. Another is of the pictures summoned by athletes during training or before a competition, outlining each step they will take to accomplish their goal. When a musician hears a song, they can sometimes "see" the song notes in their head, as well as hear them with all their tonal qualities. This is considered different from an after-effect, such as an afterimage. Calling up an image in our minds can be a voluntary act, so it can be characterized as being under various degrees of conscious control.

There are several theories as to how mental images are formed in the mind. These include the dual-code theory, the propositional theory, and the functional-equivalency hypothesis. The dual-code theory, created by Allan Paivio in 1971, is the theory that we use two separate codes to represent information in our brains: image codes and verbal codes. Image codes are things like thinking of a picture of a dog when you are thinking of a dog, whereas a verbal code would be to think of the word "dog". Another example is the difference between thinking of abstract words such as justice or love and thinking of concrete words like elephant or chair. When abstract words are thought of, it is easier to think of them in terms of verbal codes—finding words that define them or describe them. With concrete words, it is often easier to use image codes and bring up a picture of a human or chair in your mind rather than words associated or descriptive of them.

The propositional theory involves storing images in the form of a generic propositional code that stores the meaning of the concept not the image itself. The propositional codes can either be descriptive of the image or symbolic. They are then transferred back into verbal and visual code to form the mental image.

The functional-equivalency hypothesis is that mental images are "internal representations" that work in the same way as the actual perception of physical objects. In other words, the picture of a dog brought to mind when the word dog is read is interpreted in the same way as if the person was observing an actual dog before them.

Research has occurred to designate a specific neural correlate of imagery; however, studies show a multitude of results. Most studies published before 2001 suggest neural correlates of visual imagery occur in Brodmann area 17. Auditory performance imagery has been observed in the premotor areas, precunes, and medial Brodmann area 40. Auditory imagery in general occurs across participants in the temporal voice area (TVA), which allows top-down imaging manipulations, processing, and storage of audition functions. Olfactory imagery research shows activation in the anterior piriform cortex and the posterior piriform cortex; experts in olfactory imagery have larger gray matter associated to olfactory areas. Tactile imagery is found to occur in the dorsolateral prefrontal area, inferior frontal gyrus, frontal gyrus, insula, precentral gyrus, and the medial frontal gyrus with basal ganglia activation in the ventral posteriomedial nucleus and putamen (hemisphere activation corresponds to the location of the imagined tactile stimulus). Research in gustatory imagery reveals activation in the anterior insular cortex, frontal operculum, and prefrontal cortex. Novices of a specific form of mental imagery show less gray matter than experts of mental imagery congruent to that form. A meta-analysis of neuroimagery studies revealed significant activation of the bilateral dorsal parietal, interior insula, and left inferior frontal regions of the brain. Causal evidence from neurological patients with brain lesions demonstrates that vivid visual mental imagery is possible even when occipital visual areas are lesioned or disconnected from more anterior cortex. Visual mental imagery can instead be impaired by left temporal damage. Consistent with these findings, a meta-analysis of 27 neuroimaging studies demonstrated imagery-related activity in a region of the left ventral temporal cortex, which was dubbed the Fusiform Imagery Node. An additional Bayesian analysis excluded a role for occipital cortex in visual mental imagery, consistent with the evidence from neurological patients.

Imagery has been thought to cooccur with perception; however, participants with damaged sense-modality receptors can sometimes perform imagery of said modality receptors. Neuroscience with imagery has been used to communicate with seemingly unconscious individuals through fMRI activation of different neural correlates of imagery, demanding further study into low quality consciousness. A study on one patient with one occipital lobe removed found the horizontal area of their visual mental image was reduced.

== Neural substrates of visual imagery ==
Visual imagery is the ability to create mental representations of things, people, and places that are absent from an individual's visual field. This ability is crucial to problem-solving tasks, memory, and spatial reasoning. Neuroscientists have found that imagery and perception share a number of the same neural substrates, or areas of the brain that function similarly during both imagery and perception, such as the visual cortex and higher visual areas. Kosslyn and colleagues (1999) showed that the early visual cortex, Area 17 and Area 18/19, is activated during visual imagery. They found that inhibition of these areas through repetitive transcranial magnetic stimulation (rTMS) resulted in impaired visual perception and imagery. Furthermore, research conducted with lesioned patients has revealed that visual imagery and visual perception have the same representational organization. This has been concluded from patients in which impaired perception also experience visual imagery deficits at the same level of the mental representation.

Behrmann and colleagues (1992) describe a patient C.K., who provided evidence challenging the view that visual imagery and visual perception rely on the same representational system. C.K. was a 33-year old man with visual object agnosia acquired after a vehicular accident. This deficit prevented him from being able to recognize objects and copy objects fluidly. Surprisingly, his ability to draw accurate objects from memory indicated his visual imagery was intact and normal. Furthermore, C.K. successfully performed other tasks requiring visual imagery for judgment of size, shape, color, and composition. These findings conflict with previous research as they suggest there is a partial dissociation between visual imagery and visual perception. C.K. exhibited a perceptual deficit that was not associated with a corresponding deficit in visual imagery, indicating that these two processes have systems for mental representations that may not be mediated entirely by the same neural substrates.

Schlegel and colleagues (2013) conducted a functional MRI analysis of regions activated during manipulation of visual imagery. They identified 11 bilateral cortical and subcortical regions that exhibited increased activation when manipulating a visual image compared to when the visual image was just maintained. These regions included the occipital lobe and ventral stream areas, two parietal lobe regions, the posterior parietal cortex and the precuneus lobule, and three frontal lobe regions, the frontal eye fields, dorsolateral prefrontal cortex, and the prefrontal cortex. Due to their suspected involvement in working memory and attention, the authors propose that these parietal and prefrontal regions, and occipital regions, are part of a network involved in mediating the manipulation of visual imagery. These results suggest a top-down activation of visual areas in visual imagery.

Using Dynamic Causal Modeling (DCM) to determine the connectivity of cortical networks, Ishai et al. (2010) demonstrated that activation of the network mediating visual imagery is initiated by prefrontal cortex and posterior parietal cortex activity. Generation of objects from memory resulted in initial activation of the prefrontal and the posterior parietal areas, which then activate earlier visual areas through backward connectivity. Activation of the prefrontal cortex and posterior parietal cortex has also been found to be involved in retrieval of object representations from long-term memory, their maintenance in working memory, and attention during visual imagery. Thus, Ishai et al. suggest that the network mediating visual imagery is composed of attentional mechanisms arising from the posterior parietal cortex and the prefrontal cortex.

Vividness of visual imagery is a crucial component of an individual's ability to perform cognitive tasks requiring imagery. Vividness of visual imagery varies not only between individuals but also within individuals. Dijkstra and colleagues (2017) found that the variation in vividness of visual imagery is dependent on the degree to which the neural substrates of visual imagery overlap with those of visual perception. They found that overlap between imagery and perception in the entire visual cortex, the parietal precuneus lobule, the right parietal cortex, and the medial frontal cortex predicted the vividness of a mental representation. The activated regions beyond the visual areas are believed to drive the imagery-specific processes rather than the visual processes shared with perception. It has been suggested that the precuneus contributes to vividness by selecting important details for imagery. The medial frontal cortex is suspected to be involved in the retrieval and integration of information from the parietal and visual areas during working memory and visual imagery. The right parietal cortex appears to be important in attention, visual inspection, and stabilization of mental representations. Thus, the neural substrates of visual imagery and perception overlap in areas beyond the visual cortex and the degree of this overlap in these areas correlates with the vividness of mental representations during imagery.

== Philosophical ideas ==
Mental images are an important topic in classical and modern philosophy, as they are central to the study of knowledge. In the Republic, Book VII, Plato has Socrates present the Allegory of the Cave: a prisoner, bound and unable to move, sits with his back to a fire watching the shadows cast on the cave wall in front of him by people carrying objects behind his back. These people and the objects they carry are representations of real things in the world. Unenlightened man is like the prisoner, explains Socrates, a human being making mental images from the sense data that he experiences.

The eighteenth-century philosopher Bishop George Berkeley proposed similar ideas in his theory of idealism. Berkeley stated that reality is equivalent to mental images—our mental images are not a copy of another material reality but that reality itself. Berkeley, however, sharply distinguished between the images that he considered to constitute the external world, and the images of individual imagination. According to Berkeley, only the latter are considered "mental imagery" in the contemporary sense of the term.

The eighteenth century British writer Dr. Samuel Johnson criticized idealism. When asked what he thought about idealism, he is alleged to have replied "I refute it thus!" as he kicked a large rock and his leg rebounded. His point was that the idea that the rock is just another mental image and has no material existence of its own is a poor explanation of the painful sense data he had just experienced.

David Deutsch, a physicist, addresses Johnson's objection to idealism in his 1997 book The Fabric of Reality. when he states that, if we judge the value of our mental images of the world by the quality and quantity of the sense data that they can explain, then the most valuable mental image—or theory—that we currently have is that the world has a real independent existence and that humans have successfully evolved by building up and adapting patterns of mental images to explain it. Essentially, he believes that if something behaves as if it exists, we should assume it exists. He uses logic similar to Occam's Razor in thought experiments in which he proposes that invisible angels move planets or photons, and concludes we have better, more plausible explanations, so we should accept those. This also works to counter Descartes' ideas like the malicious demon.

Critics of scientific realism ask how the inner perception of mental images actually occurs. This is sometimes called the "homunculus problem" (see also the mind's eye). The problem is similar to asking how the images you see on a computer screen exist in the memory of the computer. To scientific materialism, mental images and the perception of them must be brain-states. According to critics, scientific realists cannot explain where the images and their perceiver exist in the brain. To use the analogy of the computer screen, these critics argue that cognitive science and psychology have been unsuccessful in identifying either the component in the brain (i.e., "hardware") or the mental processes that store these images (i.e. "software").

== In experimental psychology ==
Cognitive psychologists and (later) cognitive neuroscientists have empirically tested some of the philosophical questions related to whether and how the human brain uses mental imagery in cognition.

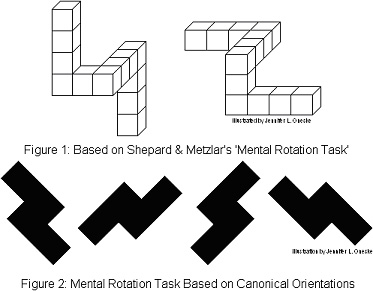
The types of rotation tests used by Shepard and Metzler

One theory of the mind that was examined in these experiments was the "brain as serial computer" philosophical metaphor of the 1970s. Psychologist Zenon Pylyshyn theorized that the human mind processes mental images by decomposing them into an underlying mathematical proposition. Roger Shepard and Jacqueline Metzler challenged that view by presenting subjects with 2D line drawings of groups of 3D block "objects" and asking them to determine whether that "object" is the same as a second figure, some of which are rotations of the first "object". Shepard and Metzler proposed that if we decomposed and then mentally re-imaged the objects into basic mathematical propositions, as the then-dominant view of cognition "as a serial digital computer" assumed, then it would be expected that the time it took to determine whether the object is the same or not would be independent of how much the object had been rotated. Shepard and Metzler found the opposite: a linear relationship between the degree of rotation in the mental imagery task and the time it took participants to reach their answer.

This mental rotation finding implied that the human mind—and the human brain—maintains and manipulates mental images as topographic and topological wholes, an implication that was quickly put to test by psychologists. Stephen Kosslyn and colleagues showed in a series of neuroimaging experiments that the mental image of objects like the letter "F" are mapped, maintained and rotated as an image-like whole in areas of the human visual cortex. Moreover, Kosslyn's work showed that there are considerable similarities between the neural mappings for imagined stimuli and perceived stimuli. The authors of these studies concluded that, while the neural processes they studied rely on mathematical and computational underpinnings, the brain also seems optimized to handle the sort of mathematics that constantly computes a series of topologically-based images rather than calculating a mathematical model of an object.

Recent studies in neurology and neuropsychology on mental imagery have further questioned the "mind as serial computer" theory, arguing instead that human mental imagery manifests both visually and kinesthetically. For example, several studies have provided evidence that people are slower at rotating line drawings of objects such as hands in directions incompatible with the joints of the human body, and that patients with painful, injured arms are slower at mentally rotating line drawings of the hand from the side of the injured arm.

Some psychologists, including Kosslyn, have argued that such results occur because of interference in the brain between distinct systems in the brain that process the visual and motor mental imagery. Subsequent neuroimaging studies showed that the interference between the motor and visual imagery system could be induced by having participants physically handle actual 3D blocks glued together to form objects similar to those depicted in the line-drawings. Amorim et al. have shown that, when a cylindrical "head" was added to Shepard and Metzler's line drawings of 3D block figures, participants were quicker and more accurate at solving mental rotation problems. They argue that motoric embodiment is not just "interference" that inhibits visual mental imagery but is capable of facilitating mental imagery.

As cognitive neuroscience approaches to mental imagery continued, research expanded beyond questions of serial versus parallel or topographic processing to questions of the relationship between mental images and perceptual representations. Both brain imaging (fMRI and ERP) and studies of neuropsychological patients have been used to test the hypothesis that a mental image is the reactivation, from memory, of brain representations normally activated during the perception of an external stimulus. In other words, if perceiving an apple activates contour and location and shape and color representations in the brain's visual system, then imagining an apple activates some or all of these same representations using information stored in memory. Early evidence for this idea came from neuropsychology. Patients with brain damage that impairs perception in specific ways, for example by damaging shape or color representations, seem generally to have impaired mental imagery in similar ways. Studies of brain function in normal human brains support this same conclusion, showing activity in the brain's visual areas while subjects imagined visual objects and scenes.

The previously mentioned and numerous related studies have led to a relative consensus within cognitive science, psychology, neuroscience, and philosophy on the neural status of mental images. In general, researchers agree that, while there is no homunculus inside the head viewing these mental images, our brains do form and maintain mental images as image-like wholes. The problem of exactly how these images are stored and manipulated within the human brain, in particular within language and communication, remains a fertile area of study.

One of the longest-running research topics regarding mental images is the individual differences of vividness of mental imagery when compared to perception. Questionnaires have been developed to assess such differences, including the Vividness of Visual Imagery Questionnaire (VVIQ). Recent studies have found that individual differences in VVIQ scores can be used to predict changes in a person's brain while visualizing different activities. Functional magnetic resonance imaging (fMRI) was used to study the association between early visual cortex activity relative to the whole brain while participants visualized themselves or another person bench pressing or stair climbing. In that study, reported image vividness correlated significantly with the relative fMRI signal in the visual cortex.

Beyond visual imagery is the Plymouth Sensory Imagery Questionnaire which measures seven senses. This form of imagery assessment correlates with the VVIQ for visual imagery and shows how other senses vary dependent on individual differences.

== Training and learning styles ==
Some educational theorists have drawn from the idea of mental imagery in their studies of learning styles. Proponents of these theories state that people often have learning processes that emphasize visual, auditory, and kinesthetic systems of experience. According to these theorists, teaching in multiple overlapping sensory systems benefits learning, and they encourage teachers to use content and media that integrates well with the visual, auditory, and kinesthetic systems whenever possible.

Educational researchers have examined whether the experience of mental imagery affects the degree of learning. For example, imagining playing a five-finger piano exercise (mental practice) resulted in a significant improvement in performance over no mental practice—though not as significant as that produced by physical practice. The authors of the study stated that "mental practice alone seems to be sufficient to promote the modulation of neural circuits involved in the early stages of motor skill learning".

Imagery training has been effective in a series of studies, mostly in sport where participants are taught formal skills to improve a mental image. Imagery training has also been effective with individuals with low abilities.

== Visualization and religion ==
Mental visualization is used across world religions, particularly as an aid for prayer or meditation.

=== Christianity ===
Opinions on the value of visualization vary within Christianity. In Catholicism, visualization plays a central role in the recitation of the Rosary, where it may be used to reach a meditative state involving visualization of Biblical scenes. This process requires repetitive verbal prayer and movement of the Rosary's beads while focusing intently on generating mental imagery. Ideally, this consists of hyper specific imagery of Biblical events, including sensory aspects beyond visual alone. The ability to generate this mental imagery is often a skill that must be developed. In Eastern Orthodoxy, however, image-based prayer is generally frowned upon, because it is seen as an opening for demonic influence, and as contradictory to the aims of hesychastic prayer.

=== Tibetan traditions ===
In general, Vajrayana Buddhism and Bön utilize sophisticated visualization or imaginal (in the language of Jean Houston of Transpersonal Psychology) processes in the Tulpa construction of the yidam sadhana, kye-rim, and dzog-rim modes of meditation and in the yantra, thangka, and mandala traditions, where holding the fully realized form in the mind is a prerequisite prior to creating an 'authentic' new art work that will provide a sacred support or foundation for deity.

== Substitution effects ==
Mental imagery can act as a substitute for the imagined experience: Imagining an experience can evoke similar cognitive, physiological, and behavioral consequences as having the corresponding experience in reality. At least four classes of such effects have been documented.

1. Imagined experiences are attributed evidentiary value like physical evidence.
2. Mental practice can instantiate the same performance benefits as physical practice and reduction central neuropathic pain.
3. Imagined consumption of a food can reduce its actual consumption.
4. Imagined goal achievement can reduce motivation for actual goal achievement.

== Psychedelic drugs ==
Some people with aphantasia have been reported to have acquired visual mental imagery after using psychedelics. While enhanced mental imagery may seem appealing, it may also pose risks such as increased risk of psychiatric disorders.

== See also ==
- Aphantasia
- Animal cognition
- Attention
- Audiation (imaginary sound)
- Cognition
- Creative visualization
- Fantasy (psychology)
- Fantasy prone personality
- Guided imagery
- Imagination
- Internal monologue
- Mental event
- Mental rotation
- Mind
- Motor imagery
- Spatial ability
- Tulpa
- Visual space
