= Adam Zeman (neurologist) =

British neurologist

- Born: September 1957 (age 69)
- Known for: coining the term "aphantasia"
- Scientific career
- Fields: Neurology
- Workplaces: University College London; University of Edinburgh; University of Exeter

Adam Zbynek James Zeman (born September 1957) is a British neurologist, who coined the term "aphantasia" for an inability to create mental images.

== Biography ==
Zeman is the son of Czech-born historian Zbyněk Zeman.

He was educated at Westminster School, then at Magdalen College and Merton College, Oxford, where he took a first degree in philosophy and psychology then trained in medicine. He trained in neurology at the National Hospital for Neurology in Queen Square, London, and Addenbrooke's Hospital in Cambridge. He completed a doctorate at Oxford in 1994.

He was appointed a lecturer at University College London in 1990, was a lecturer at the University of Edinburgh from 1996 to 2005, and has been Professor of Cognitive and Behavioural Neurology at the Peninsula Medical School (now the University of Exeter Medical School) since 2005. He is lead clinician of the Sleep Centre at the Royal Devon and Exeter Hospital. He was Chairman of the British Neuropsychiatry Association from 2007 to 2010.

His research interests include neurological disorders of sleep, disorders of visual imagery, and memory disorders associated with epilepsy, including transient epileptic amnesia.

== Aphantasia ==
Zeman first became aware that some people cannot form mental images when a man (known as "MX") reported that, after minor heart surgery, he had no mental image of people or places when he thought of them. (Note: This occurred in 2003 or 2005.) The case was reported in 2010. After several people (responding to an article on the MX case by Carl Zimmer) reported that they had never been able to visualise, Zeman and his team (including Sergio Della Sala) conducted a survey of 21 people with a self-reported lifelong lack of visual imagery, using the Vividness of Visual Imagery Questionnaire developed by David Marks. They reported in 2015, finding that despite their inability to form mental images voluntarily, most of the respondents experienced involuntary imagery as "flashes" while awake or in dreams; that they have some difficulty recalling details of their own lives; that many have compensating verbal, mathematical and logical strengths; and that they successfully perform tasks that would normally involve visualisation, such as recalling visual details, by other strategies. The paper introduced the Greek-derived term "aphantasia". It is ranked within the top 1% of research output from its time period.

Zeman leads the research project The Eye's Mind, launched in 2015, in collaboration with art historian John Onians. The project, funded by an Arts and Humanities Research Council Innovation Award, explores visualisation from scientific and artistic perspectives. One of the project's three strands studies individuals with visual imagery at the extremes of the vividness spectrum—both aphantasia and hyperphantasia (unusually vivid mental imagery). In 2019, the project organised the exhibition Extreme Imagination: Inside the Mind’s Eye, hosted at Tramway in Glasgow and the Royal Albert Memorial Museum in Exeter, which showcased works of art created by aphantasics and hyperphantasics.

He appeared on the BBC Radio 4 science programme The Curious Cases of Rutherford & Fry in 2023, to discuss aphantasia.

== Published works ==
Zeman has authored or co-authored books including:

- Zeman, Adam (2002). Consciousness: A User's Guide. Yale University Press. ISBN 0300104979.
- Zeman, Adam (2008). A Portrait of the Brain. Yale University Press. ISBN 9780300114164.
- Zeman, Adam; Jones-Gotman, Marilyn; Kapur, Narinder (2012). Epilepsy and Memory. OUP. ISBN 9780199580286.
- Zeman, Adam; Macpherson, Fiona; Onians, John (2018). Extreme Imagination: Inside the Mind's Eye. Eye's Mind, University of Exeter College of Medicine and Health. ISBN 9781527233102.
- Zeman, Adam (2025). The Shape of Things Unseen: A New Science of Imagination. Bloomsbury Publishing. ISBN 9781526609779.
