= Boundaries of the mind =

Postulated personality trait

Boundaries of the mind refers to a postulated personality trait concerning the degree of separateness ("thickness") or connection ("thinness") between mental functions and processes. Thin boundaries have been linked with open-mindedness, sensitivity, vulnerability, creativity, and artistic ability. It has been postulated that people with thin boundaries tend to confuse fantasy and reality and have a fluid sense of identity, leading them to merge or lose themselves in their relations with others. People with thick boundaries are said to differentiate clearly between reality and fantasy and between self and other, and tend to prefer well-defined social structures.

The concept was developed by psychoanalyst Ernest Hartmann from his observations of the personality characteristics of frequent nightmare sufferers. The construct has been particularly studied in relation to dream recall and lucid dreaming.

== Thin and thick boundaries ==
Ernest Hartmann proposed that people who suffer frequent nightmares have distinctive personality characteristics which he described as "unguarded", "undefended", "vulnerable", "artistic", and "open". People with such characteristics seemed to him unable to screen out frightening images and feelings originating in their dreams. They also seemed to lack barriers between their own identity and those of others, or between their own beliefs and unconventional ideas. Hartmann proposed that such people have "thin" boundaries between their mental processes and argued that thinness or thickness of boundaries was "a broad dimension of personality and an aspect of the overall organization of the mind." He considered the concept to be similar to William James's concept of "tender-mindedness" and to Blatt and Ritzler's "permeable ego boundaries". The construct is measured with the Boundary Questionnaire which assesses thinness of boundaries in relation to a variety of areas, including boundaries between sleeping and waking, thoughts and feelings, and persons, places, and values. People with thick boundaries tend to see the world in "black-and-white" terms, whereas those with thin boundaries tend to be more aware of "shades of gray". Women tend to have thinner boundaries than men, and boundaries tend to become thicker with age.

== Measurement ==
The Boundary Questionnaire consists of 145 five-point scales covering the following 12 areas:

1. sleep/wake/dreams
2. unusual experiences
3. thoughts/feelings/mood
4. childhood/adolescence/adulthood
5. interpersonal relationships
6. sensitivity
7. neat/exact/precise
8. edges/lines/clothing
9. opinions about children
10. opinions about organisations
11. opinions about people, nations, and groups
12. opinions about beauty and truth.

Additionally, a total score (SumBound) reflecting boundary thinness was derived by summing the ratings of 138 items.

== Relationship to other personality traits ==
The Boundary Questionnaire has been related to the Five Factor Model of personality, and "thin boundaries" are mostly associated with openness to experience, particularly the facets of openness to fantasy, aesthetics, and feelings, although some of the content was correlated with neuroticism, extraversion, and low conscientiousness. Scores on the questionnaire are also positively correlated with absorption, transliminality, hypnotisability, and suggestibility. Thin boundaries are also associated with the Feeling and Intuition scales of the Myers-Briggs Type Indicator.

== Psychopathology ==
It has been suggested that persons diagnosed with schizotypal personality disorder or with borderline personality disorder tend to have thinner boundaries than the rest of the population, whereas people with obsessive-compulsive disorder tend to have thicker boundaries. On the Minnesota Multiphasic Personality Inventory, thin boundaries have appeared to be associated with high scores on the paranoia scale, and in males with high femininity and low defensiveness. Thin boundaries in males have therefore been linked to willingness to accept "feminine" aspects of the self, whereas men with thick boundaries may tend to believe that "men are men, women are women".

== Dreaming ==
One study reported that people with thin boundaries have more frequent dream recall, have more nightmares, and may also have longer, more intense dreams, with more bizarre content. Additionally, people with thin boundaries appeared to value their dreams more, especially in terms of their meaningfulness and creative aspects. A finding that people with thin boundaries were more likely to report having had childhood nightmares led the authors to suggest that boundary thinness may be relatively stable across the lifespan.

== New age beliefs ==
Adherence to new age beliefs and practices, such as yoga, reiki, divination, and astrology, have been linked with thin boundaries as well as with measures of schizotypy and magical thinking. New age beliefs and thin boundaries may be related through such shared factors as a sense of "connectedness", holism and emotional sensitivity, as well as a thinking style defined by looseness of association.

== See also ==
- Hyperphantasia
- Personal boundaries
- Fantasy-prone personality
- Schizotypal personality disorder
