= Maladaptive daydreaming =

Trait associated with some mental disorders

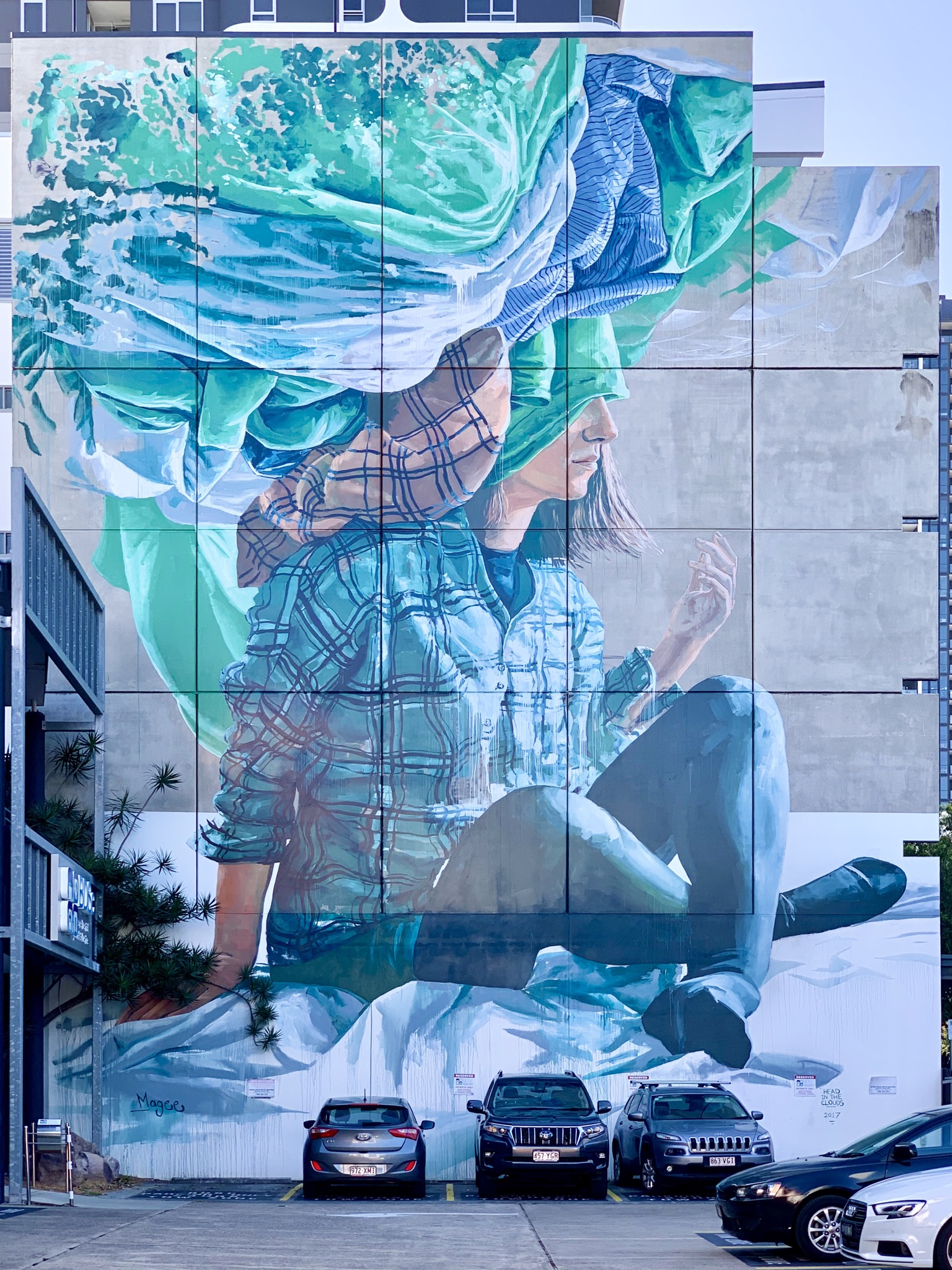
Daydreaming can become maladaptive when it interferes with everyday life.

Maladaptive daydreaming, also called excessive daydreaming, is when an individual experiences excessive daydreaming that interferes with daily life. It is a diagnosis proposed by Eli Somer for a disordered form of dissociative absorption, associated with excessive fantasy that is not recognized by any major medical or psychological criteria. Maladaptive daydreaming can result in distress, can replace human interaction, and may interfere with normal functioning such as social life or work. The term was coined in 2002 by Eli Somer of the University of Haifa. Somer's definition of the proposed condition is "extensive fantasy activity that replaces human interaction and/or interferes with academic, interpersonal, or vocational functioning." There has been limited research outside of Somer's.

== Range of daydreaming ==
Daydreaming, a form of normal dissociation associated with absorption, is a highly prevalent mental activity experienced by almost everyone. Some individuals reportedly possess the ability to daydream so vividly that they experience a sense of presence in the imagined environment. This experience is reported to be extremely rewarding to the extent that some of those who experience it develop a compulsion to repeat it that it has been described as an addiction.

Somer proposed "stimuli" for maladaptive daydreams that may relate to specific locations. The main proposed symptom is extremely vivid fantasies with "story-like features", such as the daydream's characters, plots and settings. Somer argued that maladaptive daydreaming is not a form of psychosis, as people with maladaptive daydreaming can tell that their fantasies are not real, while those with psychotic disorders have difficulty separating hallucinations or delusions from reality.

== Causes ==
There is no consensus among psychologists as to the causes of maladaptive daydreaming, although some experts believe it may be a coping mechanism. Teenagers and young adults, particularly those with childhood trauma or abuse, more frequently report having the condition than older adults do. Individuals with the condition sometimes share traits with other behavioral addictions, such as gambling or video games, and may use their daydreams as a means to escape reality.

== Common themes ==
Research indicates that individuals who experience maladaptive daydreaming often engage in the dissociative behaviors for a few reasons that appear to be a pattern. Violence is one of the factors, as some individuals who have maladaptive daydreaming report engaging in their daydreams to fulfill fantasies of aggression or slaughter. Others report engaging in maladaptive daydreaming to think about their idealized selves, and found it pleasing to imagine themselves as who they wish to be. Some individuals who experience maladaptive daydreaming have also proclaimed to engage in the behaviors to feel a sense of power, an escape, or for sexual arousal.

== Treatment ==
While maladaptive daydreaming is not a recognized psychiatric disorder, it has spawned online support groups since Somer first reported the proposed disorder in 2002. Although there are no specific treatments recommended for maladaptive daydreaming, Harvard Medical School suggests individuals with the condition may find treating other mental health conditions to be effective.

== Research ==
Maladaptive daydreaming is currently studied by a consortium of researchers (The International Consortium for Maladaptive Daydreaming Research or ICMDR) from diverse countries including the United States, Poland, Switzerland, Israel, Greece and Italy.

== Diagnosis ==
There are no official ways to diagnose maladaptive daydreaming in patients because it has not yet been recognized in any official diagnostic manual for psychiatry, such as the DSM-5-TR. However, some methods have been developed in an attempt to gauge the proposed mental disorder's prevalence.

=== Maladaptive Daydreaming Scale (MDS-16) ===
In 2015, a 14-item self-report measurement, known as the Maladaptive Daydreaming Scale or MDS-16, was designed to identify abnormalities in the daydreaming of individuals. The purpose of designing this instrument was to provide a reliable and valid measurement of the existence of the proposed condition in patients and to garner attention to the potential existence of maladaptive daydreaming as a mental disorder. An additional two items were later added, assessing the use of music in fostering daydreaming. The MDS-16 has been used in several countries, such as the United States, Turkey, the United Kingdom, Italy, and Israel.

=== Potential comorbidity ===
Maladaptive daydreaming has been identified to potentially have comorbidity with a number of already existing recognized mental disorders such as attention deficit hyperactivity disorder, anxiety disorder, autism spectrum disorder, major depressive disorder, and obsessive–compulsive disorder. In one case study, a patient believed to have the condition was administered fluvoxamine, a medication typically used to treat those with OCD. The patient found she was better able to control the frequency of her daydreaming episodes. Maladaptive daydreaming has also shown to have a comorbidity with general mental health problems, such as low emotional regulation, low self-efficacy, low self-esteem, personality disorders, feelings of loneliness, and overall higher levels of psychological distress.

== In media ==
James Thurber's story The Secret Life of Walter Mitty, written in 1939, showcases the main character, Walter, as he experiences maladaptive daydreaming while working in an office and regularly imagines himself in heroic situations. The character is also related to that of a fantasy-prone personality. The story has been adapted twice into film, first in 1947 by Norman Z. McLeod, and again in 2013 by Ben Stiller.

Reality shifting is a pseudoscientific trend that appears to be a form of excessive daydreaming, which emerged as an internet phenomenon on TikTok around 2020. Professionals often describe it as a maladaptive coping mechanism because its primary goal is to provide an elaborate escape from the individual's "current reality".

== See also ==
- Avoidant personality disorder
- Cognitive shifting
- Hyperphantasia
- Hyperthymesia
- Mind-wandering
- Procrastination
- Schizoid personality disorder
- Schizotypal personality disorder
