= Transliminality =

Parapsychology concept

Transliminality (lit. 'going beyond the threshold') is a concept introduced by the parapsychologist Michael Thalbourne, an Australian psychologist who was based at the University of Adelaide. It is defined as a hypersensitivity to psychological material (imagery, ideation, affect, and perception) originating in (a) the unconscious, and/or (b) the external environment (Thalbourne & Maltby, 2008). High degrees of this trait have been shown by Thalbourne to be associated with increased tendency to mystical experience, greater creativity, and greater belief in the paranormal, but Thalbourne has also found evidence that transliminality may be positively correlated with psychoticism. He has published articles on transliminality in journals on parapsychology and psychology.

== Measurement and correlates ==
The original transliminality scale had 29 items. A revised version with 17 items was developed to eliminate bias associated with age and gender differences. The revised version of the transliminality scale includes items assessing magical ideation, mystical experience, absorption, hyperaesthesia, manic experience, dream interpretation, and fantasy proneness.

=== Dreaming ===
The revised scale was found to be positively correlated with seven types of dream experiences:

- lucid dreams
- archetypal dreams - dreams "carrying a sense of awe and fascination and/or encounters with strange and unusual beings"
- fantastic nightmares - upsetting and very vivid memorable dreams, involving a range of negative emotions
- prelucid dreams - where one questions whether one is dreaming but cannot decide
- control dreams - control not possible in waking life is exercised in the dream
- posttraumatic nightmares - a traumatic real event is relived
- night terrors - awakening in terror with no recall of dream content

=== Personality ===
Transliminality is positively correlated with openness to experience and negatively correlated with tough-mindedness and self-control from the 16PF Questionnaire. Some of the item content assesses absorption and the scale is therefore correlated with the Tellegen Absorption Scale. Transliminality is conceptually similar to Ernest Hartmann's concept of "boundaries of the mind" and accordingly is correlated with the Boundary Questionnaire.

== See also ==
- Schizotypy
- Self-transcendence
