= Aphantasia =

Inability to picture something in one's mind

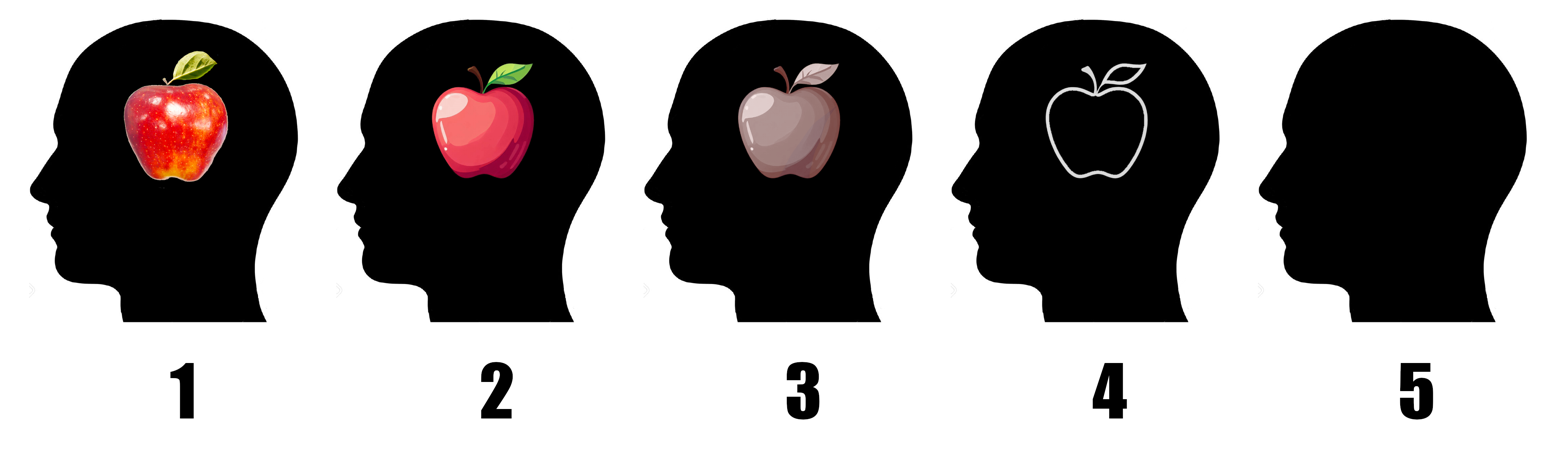
A representation of how people with differing visualization abilities might picture an apple in their mind. The first image is bright and photographic, levels 2 through 4 show increasingly simpler and more faded images, and the last—representing complete aphantasia—shows no image at all.

Aphantasia (/ˌeɪfænˈteɪʒə/ AY-fan-TAY-zhə, /ˌæfænˈteɪʒə/ AF-an-TAY-zhə) is the inability to voluntarily visualize mental images. Aphantasia can be considered the opposite of hyperphantasia, the condition of having extremely vivid mental imagery.

The phenomenon was first described by Francis Galton in 1880, but it has remained relatively unstudied until recently. Interest in the phenomenon was renewed after the publication of a study in 2015 by a team led by the neurologist Adam Zeman of the University of Exeter. Zeman's team coined the term aphantasia, derived from the Ancient Greek word phantasia (φαντασία), which means 'appearance/image', and the prefix a- (ἀ-), which means 'without'. People with aphantasia are called aphantasics, or less commonly aphants, or aphantasiacs.

== History ==
The phenomenon was first described by Francis Galton in 1880, in a statistical study on mental imagery. Galton wrote:

To my astonishment, I found that the great majority of the men of science to whom I first applied, protested that mental imagery was unknown to them, and they looked on me as fanciful and fantastic in supposing that the words "mental imagery" really expressed what I believed everybody supposed them to mean. They had no more notion of its true nature than a colour-blind man who has not discerned his defect has of the nature of colour.

In 1897, the psychologist Théodule-Armand Ribot reported a kind of "typographic visual type" imagination, consisting in mentally seeing ideas in the form of the corresponding printed words. As paraphrased by Jacques Hadamard,

The first discovery of this by Ribot was the case of a man whom he mentions as a well-known physiologist. For that man, even the words "dog, animal" (while he was living among dogs and experimenting on them daily) were not accompanied by any image, but were seen by him as being printed. Similarly, when he heard the name of an intimate friend, he saw it printed and had to make an effort to see the image of this friend... Moreover, according to Ribot, men belonging to the typographic-visual type cannot conceive how other people's thought can proceed differently.

The phenomenon remained largely unstudied until 2005, when Professor Adam Zeman of the University of Exeter was approached by a man who seemed to have lost the ability to visualize after undergoing minor surgery. Following the publication of this patient's case in 2010, a number of people approached Zeman reporting a lifelong inability to visualize. In 2015, Zeman's team published a paper on what they termed "congenital aphantasia"—a form of aphantasia in which individuals have never had the ability to generate voluntary mental images— sparking renewed interest in the phenomenon.

One way of considering aphantasia is to ask a person to imagine a red apple (or red star) and rate their "mind's eye" depiction of it on a scale from 1 (photographic visualisation) through to 5 (no visualisation at all). Such a test was popularised on social media in 2020. Many people are shocked to learn that their own ability or inability to visualise objects is not universal.

== Research ==
Zeman's 2015 paper used the Vividness of Visual Imagery Questionnaire (VVIQ), developed by David Marks in 1973, to evaluate the quality of the mental image of 21 self-diagnosed and self-selected participants. He found that most aphantasics lack voluntary visualizations only; the majority of test subjects did report involuntary visualizations such as dreams. Along with Zeman's reports of involuntary mental imagery occurring during dream states, a 2020 study found that individuals with aphantasia experience less control and fewer sensory emotions during dreams compared to those with a strong ability to generate voluntary mental images while awake. The lack of intense emotions is thought to result from a functional trade-off—competition between two neural systems—occurring between semantic information and sensory qualities, which is strongly associated with individuals who have low VVIQ scores.

In 2017, a paper measured the sensory capacity of mental imagery using binocular-rivalry (BR) and imagery-based priming and found that when asked to imagine a stimulus, the self-reported aphantasics experienced almost no perceptual priming, compared to those who reported higher imagery scores where perceptual priming had an effect. In 2020, Keogh and Pearson published another paper illustrating measurable differences correlated with visual imagery, this time by indirectly measuring cortical excitability in the primary visual cortex (V1).

In 2018, a study analyzing the visual working memory of a person with aphantasia found that mental imagery has a "functional role in areas of visual cognition, one of which is high-precision working memory" and that the person with aphantasia performed significantly worse than controls on visual working memory trials requiring the highest degree of precision, and lacked metacognitive insight into their performance.

A 2020 study concluded that those who experience aphantasia also experience reduced imagery in other senses, and have less vivid autobiographical memories. In addition to deficits in autobiographical memories compared to people without aphantasia, people with aphantasia had significant differences in all aspects of memory when compared to the performance of people without aphantasia. A 2021 study concluded that while those with aphantasia reported fewer objects in drawing recall, they showed high spatial memory concerning controls in drawings, with these differences only appearing during the recall stage of the study.

In March 2021, a study that measured the perspiration (via skin conductance levels) of participants in response to reading a frightening story and then viewing fear-inducing images found that participants with aphantasia, but not the general population, experienced a flat-line physiological response during the reading experiment, but found no difference in physiological responses between the groups when participants viewed fear-inducing images. The study concluded the evidence supported the emotional amplification theory of visual imagery.

In August 2021, a study found that people with aphantasia have slower reaction times than people without aphantasia in a visual search task in which they were presented with a target and a distractor. But both groups saw a similar reduction in reaction time when primed with the color of the target compared to if primed with the color of the distractor or a third color, suggesting that people with and without aphantasia were primed in the same way. The researchers hypothesized that this may be because the color of the prime is not relevant to the search task. To explore this, a follow-up experiment by the same researchers found people without aphantasia saw a greater reduction in reaction time when selecting the target from two images compared to from two words. At the same time, both people with and without aphantasia were faster in the image task than the word task. A 2023 study explored more natural scenarios and found that aphantasics are slower at solving hidden object pictures.

In October 2021, a study by Keogh, Wicken, and Pearson focusing on the role of visual imagery in visual working memory tasks specifically considered the strategies people with aphantasia use in these tasks. It found no significant differences in visual working memory task performances for those with aphantasia when compared to controls. However, significant differences were found in the reported strategies used by aphantasic individuals across the memory tasks.

A 2021, study relating aphantasia, synesthesia, and autism was published that found that people with aphantasia reported more autistic traits than people without aphantasia, with weaknesses in imagination and social skills. In addition to congenital aphantasia, there have been cases reported of acquired aphantasia—characterized by new onset of diminished voluntary visual imagery—due either to brain injury or psychological causes. Another 2021 study reported on acquired aphantasia following a case of COVID-19.

An October 2021 study aimed to provide insights into the correlation between auditory and visual imagery. The research, conducted on a sample of 128 participants, included 34 individuals who self-identified as having aphantasia. The study found a strong association between auditory imagery (measured using the Bucknell Auditory Imagery Scale-Vividness, BAIS-V) and visual imagery (measured using the Vividness of Visual Imagery Questionnaire-Modified, VVIQ-M). They found most people who self-reported having aphantasia also reported weak or entirely absent auditory imagery. Moreover, participants lacking auditory imagery tended to be aphantasic. The authors proposed a new term, "anauralia", to describe the absence of auditory imagery, particularly the lack of an "inner voice". A subsequent study, corroborated this finding, showing that the majority of a sample of people recruited on the basis of visual aphantasia also reported having reduced auditory imagery; however, this self-reported reduction in auditory imagery was not evident in performance on tasks thought to require auditory imagery, including a musical pitch imagery and voice recognition task.

A 2022 study estimated the prevalence of aphantasia among the general population by screening undergraduate students and people from an online crowdsourcing marketplace through the Vividness of Visual Imagery Questionnaire. They found that 0.8% of the population was unable to form visual mental images, and 3.9% of the population was either unable to form mental images or had dim or vague mental imagery. Sitek and Konieczna have posed that its progressive form may be a harbinger of dementia. A group of authors interviewed people with aphantasia about their lives and found that they generated fewer episodic details than controls for both past and future events, indicating that visual imagery is an important cognitive tool for dynamic retrieval and recombination of episodic details.

There have been various approaches to find a general theory of aphantasia or incorporate it into philosophical, psychological, and linguistic research. Blomkvist has suggested that aphantasia is best explained as a malfunction of processes in the episodic system and sees it as an episodic system condition. Nanay has argued that at least some instances of this condition can be explained in terms of unconscious mental imagery. Alternative explanations for aphantasia have also been proposed in the scientific literature. Lorenzatti provides a summary of these views. Aphantasia also has been studied from philosophical perspectives. Šekrst proposed that a gradual range of perceptions and mental images, from aphantasia to hyperphantasia, influences philosophical analysis of mental imagery from a fuzzy standpoint, along with influence on linguistics and semiotics. Whiteley argues that a modified theory of dreaming has to incorporate aphantasia, by involving the claim that dreams are a non-voluntary form of imagination. Additionally, research by Boran into romantic desire has shown a potential link between vividness of mental imagery and romantic feelings, suggesting that mental imagery may also play a role in emotional memory and relationships.

In 2024, a research team led by Jonathan Rhodes from the University of Plymouth assessed the imagery abilities of over 300 athletes finding a small sample of 27 who had aphantasia or low imagery abilities. The researchers developed a training program over six weeks to improve imagery ability, finding that it can be significantly improved for the majority of participants. In addition, the research of Keogh and Pearson's follow-up with over 50 participants further confirmed the absence of sensory imagery in aphantasia, adding evidence to the field of study. Zeman also proposes that alterations in connectivity between the frontoparietal and visual networks may provide the neural substrate for extreme variations in visual imagery. Some people with aphantasia have acquired visual mental imagery after using psychedelics like ayahuasca or psilocybin. There is also research into multisensory aphantasia, where people experience a deficit with mental imagery in other domains such as sound, touch, smell, taste, motion, etc.

== Notable cases ==
- 15, American software engineer and creator of 15.ai
- Jonathan Blow, American video game designer and programmer
- Ed Catmull, co-founder of Pixar and former president of Walt Disney Animation Studios. Catmull surveyed 540 colleagues from Pixar about their mental visualization and found that the production managers tended to have stronger visualizations than the artists.
- Gordon Clark, 20th-century American Presbyterian theologian and philosopher. This may have influenced his development of an epistemology that did not rely on physical sensation but on rational propositional revelation from the Bible.
- Laura Kate Dale, English writer and activist
- Wolfe Glick, professional esports player
- John Green, American author, educator, and YouTube influencer
- James Harkin, British podcaster and television writer
- Richard Herring, British comedian and podcaster
- Aldous Huxley, English writer and philosopher, who described in The Doors of Perception a lifelong near-absence of visual imagination, a profile strongly consistent with modern descriptions of aphantasia.
- Penn Jillette, American magician and television personality
- Glen Keane, animator, author, and illustrator
- Lynne Kelly, writer on mnemonics and memory techniques. Kelly has reported that she has aphantasia, but notes that she still uses personal memory methods, such as the memory palace, which are typically thought to rely on visual memory.
- Mark Lawrence, fantasy author
- Yoon Ha Lee, science fiction author
- Laura Lexx, comedian
- Emad Mostaque, founder and the CEO of Stability AI
- Bob Muyskens, podcast host
- Derek Parfit, British philosopher. His aphantasia may have influenced his longtime interest in photography.
- Hollis Robbins, academic, essayist, and poet
- Blake Ross, co-creator of the web browser Mozilla Firefox. In April 2016, Ross published an essay describing his own aphantasia and his realization that not everyone experiences it. The essay gained wide circulation on social media and in a variety of news sources.
- Michelle Sagara, fantasy author
- Sharon Slater, Irish writer and historian
- Craig Venter, geneticist
- Andy Weir, American science-fiction novelist.
- Matthew Yglesias, journalist and co-founder of Vox

== See also ==
- Charcot–Wilbrand syndrome
- Hyperphantasia – Opposite side of the visualisation spectrum to aphantasia, extremely vivid mental imagery
- Creative visualization – Purposeful visualisation for neuropsychological, physiological or social effects
- Number form – Mental map of numbers
- Prefrontal synthesis – Conscious process of synthesizing mental images
- Prosopagnosia – Cognitive disorder of face perception
- Synesthesia
