= MPQ =

MPQ may refer to

- Marvel Puzzle Quest
- Max Planck Institute of Quantum Optics
- MPQ (file format)
- Multidimensional Personality Questionnaire
