= Eli Somer =

Israeli clinical psychologist (born 1951)

- אלי זומר
- Born: Haifa, Israel
- Scientific career
- Fields: Clinical psychology, Maladaptive daydreaming, trauma and dissociation
- Workplaces: University of Haifa
- Doctoral advisor: Carolyn M. Tucker

Eliezer "Eli" Somer (Hebrew: אלי זומר; born 1951) is an Israeli clinical psychologist and Professor Emeritus at the University of Haifa. He is known for introducing the concept of maladaptive daydreaming, a proposed psychological condition describing immersive, compulsive fantasy activity that interferes with daily functioning. His research focuses on trauma, dissociation, childhood abuse, and the assessment and treatment of trauma-related disorders. Somer is a former president of both the International Society for the Study of Trauma and Dissociation (ISSTD) and the European Society for Trauma and Dissociation (ESTD), and has received several awards for his contributions to trauma psychology and dissociation research.

== Biography ==
=== Early life and education ===
Somer was born in Israel on 26 August 1951 to parents who were Holocaust survivors. He studied psychology at the University of Haifa, where he received a bachelor's degree in 1976 and a master's degree in 1980. He earned a Ph.D. in counseling psychology from the University of Florida in 1984 under the supervision of Carolyn M. Tucker. His doctoral dissertation examined the influence of marital adjustment and patient engagement on treatment adherence among individuals receiving chronic hemodialysis. Following his doctoral studies, Somer completed postdoctoral training in traumatic stress and clinical psychology before returning to Israel.

=== Academic and clinical career ===
Somer joined the University of Haifa in 1987 through the R. D. Wolfe Center for the Study of Psychological Stress and became a faculty member of the School of Social Work in 1992. He later served as Professor of Clinical Psychology and was subsequently appointed Professor Emeritus. Alongside his academic career, he was clinical director of the Maytal – Israel Institute for Treatment and Study of Stress from 1987 to 2007.

His work has combined academic research with clinical practice, focusing on trauma-related disorders, dissociation, hypnosis, childhood abuse, and imagination-related psychopathology. Somer is certified by the Israeli Ministry of Health as a supervisor in both clinical psychology and hypnosis and has continued to work as a psychotherapist and clinical supervisor while maintaining an active research program. He also has served as scientific adviser to Trauma and Dissociation Israel and has held leadership positions in several international professional organizations devoted to trauma and dissociation.

== Research ==
Somer's research focuses on psychological trauma, dissociation, the outcome of childhood maltreatment, and the clinical assessment of trauma-related disorders. His early work examined delayed disclosure of childhood sexual abuse, therapist misconduct, dissociative experiences, psychosocial stress, and the psychological consequences of terrorism and armed conflict. He has also contributed to research on hypnosis, attachment, emotion regulation, and cross-cultural aspects of trauma.

In 2002, Somer introduced the term maladaptive daydreaming in a qualitative study of six patients, describing immersive fantasy activity that interfered with interpersonal, academic, or vocational functioning. His original qualitative study established the theoretical foundation for subsequent research into the phenomenon, which has since become an international area of investigation involving researchers from psychology, psychiatry, and neuroscience.

Following his initial description of maladaptive daydreaming, Somer collaborated with researchers internationally on its assessment and characterization. In 2016, Somer, Jonathan Lehrfeld, Jayne Bigelsen, and Daniela S. Jopp developed and validated the Maladaptive Daydreaming Scale (MDS), a 14-item self-report measure designed to assess maladaptive daydreaming. The original MDS identified three related dimensions: yearning, kinesthesia, and impairment, and demonstrated internal consistency, temporal stability, and validity in distinguishing participants with and without maladaptive daydreaming. The scale was subsequently expanded to 16 items, with two additional items addressing the role of music in initiating or maintaining daydreaming; this version became known as the MDS-16.

In 2017, Somer, Nirit Soffer-Dudek, Colin A. Ross, and Naomi Halpern developed the Structured Clinical Interview for Maladaptive Daydreaming (SCIMD) and proposed diagnostic criteria for the condition. The interview was adapted from the structure of the Structured Clinical Interview for DSM-5 and was designed to assess the proposed diagnostic criteria through a structured clinical interview. In an initial study involving participants with and without maladaptive daydreaming, the researchers examined the agreement between interviewers and the relationship between the interview and the MDS. Subsequent studies have used the SCIMD alongside the MDS-16 in examining maladaptive daydreaming.

Somer's subsequent research has examined the prevalence and characteristics of maladaptive daydreaming and its associations with obsessive-compulsive symptoms, dissociation, attention-deficit/hyperactivity disorder, anxiety, depression, and other psychological conditions. Research has also examined associations between maladaptive daydreaming and traumatic experiences. Some studies have reported relationships between maladaptive daydreaming and childhood trauma, while other research has identified maladaptive daydreaming in individuals without reported trauma histories. These findings have led researchers to consider trauma as one possible developmental factor rather than a universal explanation for the phenomenon.

During the late 2010s and 2020s, Somer's scholarship expanded into longitudinal and cross-cultural investigations of maladaptive daydreaming. His publications examined the condition during the COVID-19 pandemic, investigated its overlap with depersonalization-derealization disorder and dissociative identity disorder, and evaluated emerging phenomena such as "reality shifting''. He has also contributed to international position papers discussing the current evidence, diagnostic challenges, and future directions for maladaptive daydreaming research.

A 2022 study estimated a point prevalence of 2.5 percent in the general Israeli-Jewish population, with higher rates among young adults and student samples. Prevalence in other national and cultural populations remains to be established.

Somer's research on maladaptive daydreaming has received coverage from international media, including BBC News, The Wall Street Journal, The Guardian, Scientific American, and New Scientist.

Alongside his journal articles, Somer has authored and edited books on psychotherapy, trauma, dissociation, and mental health. His 1999 book on dual relationships in psychotherapy examined ethical issues surrounding therapist-client sexual exploitation, while Mental Health in Terror's Shadow (2005), co-edited with Arieh Bleich, explored the psychological impact of terrorism in Israel. In 2026, he published Trapped in Fantasy: When Fantasy Takes Over Life a Hebrew-language volume synthesizing more than two decades of clinical and scientific work on maladaptive daydreaming, bringing together current knowledge on its assessment, treatment, and relationship to trauma and dissociation.

== Professional leadership ==
Somer has held leadership positions in several international organizations devoted to the study and treatment of trauma and dissociation. He served as president of the International Society for the Study of Trauma and Dissociation (ISSTD) from 2005 to 2006 and of the European Society for Trauma and Dissociation (ESTD) from 2009 to 2011. He has also served as scientific adviser to Trauma and Dissociation Israel (TDIL), contributed to professional education and clinical training, and participated in editorial and advisory activities related to trauma, dissociation, and psychotherapy.

== Forensic and public work ==
Alongside his academic research and clinical practice, Somer has served as an expert witness and consultant in Israeli legal proceedings involving psychological trauma, dissociation, childhood sexual abuse, and delayed disclosure. His expert opinions have been cited in court proceedings and public discussions concerning traumatic memory and the psychological effects of abuse. He has studied delayed disclosure of abuse, dissociation, therapist sexual misconduct, and the psychological consequences of interpersonal violence. His research on therapist–client sexual exploitation examined survivors' retrospective accounts and informed discussions of professional ethics and patient protection.He has also trained mental health professionals, law enforcement personnel, prosecutors, and rape crisis volunteers on the psychological effects of trauma and dissociation.

Somer has served as an expert witness in Israeli courts on matters relating to trauma, dissociation, childhood sexual abuse, and psychiatric assessment.

== Publications ==
=== Books ===
- Somer, E. (1999). Dual Relationships: Seduction and sexual exploitation in counseling and psychotherapy. Tel Aviv: Papyrus - Tel Aviv University Publishing House (in Hebrew), 279 pages.
- Somer, E. & Bleich, A. (Eds.) (2005). Mental Health In Terror's Shadow: The Israeli Experience . Tel Aviv: Ramot - Tel Aviv University (in Hebrew), 588 pages.
- Captive in Imagination: When Daydreaming Takes Over Life (2026)(original title: בהקיץ משתלטת על החיים).

=== Articles ===
- Somer, Eli (2002-09-01). "Maladaptive Daydreaming: A Qualitative Inquiry". Journal of Contemporary Psychotherapy. 32 (2): 197–212. doi:10.1023/A:1020597026919. ISSN 1573-3564.
- Somer, Eli; Lehrfeld, Jonathan; Bigelsen, Jayne; Jopp, Daniela S. (January 2016). "Development and validation of the Maladaptive Daydreaming Scale (MDS)". Consciousness and Cognition. 39: 77–91. doi:10.1016/j.concog.2015.12.001. ISSN 1090-2376. PMID 26707384.
- Marcusson-Clavertz, David; West, Melina; Kjell, Oscar N. E.; Somer, Eli (2019). "A daily diary study on maladaptive daydreaming, mind wandering, and sleep disturbances: Examining within-person and between-persons relations". PLOS ONE. 14 (11) e0225529. Bibcode:2019PLoSO..1425529M. doi:10.1371/journal.pone.0225529. ISSN 1932-6203. PMC 6880993. PMID 31774836.
- Soffer-Dudek, Nirit; Somer, Eli; Abu-Rayya, Hisham M.; Metin, Barış; Schimmenti, Adriano (2020-11-02). "Different cultures, similar daydream addiction? An examination of the cross-cultural measurement equivalence of the Maladaptive Daydreaming Scale". Journal of Behavioral Addictions. 9 (4): 1056–1067. doi:10.1556/2006.2020.00080. ISSN 2063-5303. PMC 8969720. PMID 33141115.
- Somer, Eli; Cardeña, Etzel; Catelan, Ramiro Figueiredo; Soffer-Dudek, Nirit (2021-10-30). "Reality shifting: psychological features of an emergent online daydreaming culture". Current Psychology. 42 (14): 11415–11427. doi:10.1007/s12144-021-02439-3. ISSN 1046-1310. PMC 8556810. PMID 34744401.
- Soffer-Dudek, Nirit; Somer, Eli; Spiegel, David; Chefetz, Richard; O'Neil, John; Dorahy, Martin J.; Cardeña, Etzel; Mamah, Daniel; Schimmenti, Adriano; Musetti, Alessandro; Boon, Suzette; van Dijke, Annemiek; Ross, Colin; Nijenhuis, Ellert; Krause-Utz, Annegret (2025). "Maladaptive daydreaming should be included as a dissociative disorder in psychiatric manuals: position paper". The British Journal of Psychiatry. 226 (4): 238–242. doi:10.1192/bjp.2024.279. ISSN 0007-1250. PMC 12038384. PMID 40094484.
- Somer, Eli; Iyer, Ashwini S. (2026-05-18). "Literature as early witness: Immersive and maladaptive daydreaming before their recognition in psychology". Psychology of Consciousness: Theory, Research, and Practice. doi:10.1037/cns0000478. ISSN 2326-5531.

== Awards and honors ==
- 1984 – President's Award, University of Florida.
- 1984 – Inducted into the College of Liberal Arts and Sciences Hall of Fame, University of Florida.
- 1998, 1999, 2010, 2013, 2014 – Outstanding Lecturer Award, School of Social Work, University of Haifa.
- 2000 – Cornelia B. Wilbur Award for Outstanding Contributions to the Field of Trauma and Dissociation, International Society for the Study of Trauma and Dissociation.
- 2001 – Honorary Fellow, International Society for the Study of Trauma and Dissociation.
- 2006 – President's Award, International Society for the Study of Trauma and Dissociation.
- 2012 – President's Award, European Society for Trauma and Dissociation.
- 2014 – Lifetime Achievement Award for Contributions to Trauma and Dissociation Research, International Society for the Study of Trauma and Dissociation.
