= Haxby (disambiguation) =

Haxby is a town in North Yorkshire, England.

Haxby may also refer to

== Places ==
- Haxby, Illinois, town now known as Effner

== People ==
- James V. Haxby (born 1951), American neuroscientist
- Thomas Haxby (1729-1796), English musical instrument maker

== Other ==
- Haxby & Gillespie, architectural firm in North Dakota
