= Zbyněk Zeman =

British historian of Czech origin (1928–2011)

- Born: Zbyněk Anthony Bohuslav Zeman; 18 October 1928; Prague, Czechoslovakia
- Died: 22 June 2011 (aged 82)
- Children: 3, including Adam Zeman

Academic background
- Education: Charles University (did not graduate); University College London (BA); St Antony's College, Oxford (PhD)

Academic work
- Discipline: History
- Sub-discipline: Modern history, European History
- Institutions: University of Oxford; University of St Andrews; Lancaster University; Charles University; Amnesty International

Zbyněk Anthony Bohuslav Zeman (18 October 1928 – 22 June 2011) was a Czech historian who later became a naturalised British citizen.

== Early life and education ==
Zeman was born in 1928 in Prague, then part of Czechoslovakia. As were the case for other children in Eastern Europe at the time, his schooling was disrupted during World War II. Zeman, alongside some other 100 Czech students, spent the 1946-47 academic year in the UK and was said to fall in love with the country. He eventually fled his home country after the 1948 Czechoslovak coup d'état, settling in London. Having previously started his studies at Charles University, he was able to continue his education at University College London, financially supported by the Czechoslovak Refugee Trust Fund. He earned his Bachelor of Arts degree in History in 1951 before completing doctoral studies at St Antony's College, Oxford.

== Career ==
He published widely on the history of Central and Eastern Europe in the 20th century. As an academic, he taught at the Universities of St Andrews, Lancaster, Oxford and Prague.

He also worked for The Economist magazine and Amnesty International. In particular, Zeman was responsible for organising the translation into English of A Chronicle of Current Events, the samizdat periodical that documented human rights violations in the USSR from 1968 to 1982.

== Selected works ==
- Uranium Matters: Central European Uranium in International Politics, 1900–1960 (with Rainer Karlsch, Budapest: CEU Press, 2008)
- The Life of Edvard Beneš, 1884–1948: Czechoslovakia in Peace and War (Oxford: Clarendon Press, 1997)
- The Making and Breaking of Communist Europe (Oxford: Basil Blackwell, 1991)
- Pursued by a Bear: The Making of Eastern Europe (London: Chatto & Windus, 1989)
- Heckling Hitler: Caricatures of the Third Reich (London: Tauris, 1984; 2nd edn. Hanover, NH: University Press of New England, 1987)
- Selling the War: Art & Propaganda in World War II (London: Orbis Books, 1978)
- Comecon Oil and Gas within the Overall Energy Context (with Jan Zoubek, London: Financial Times Press, 1977)
- The Masaryks: The Making of Czechoslovakia (London: Weidenfeld & Nicolson, 1976; reprinted by Tauris, 1990)
- A Diplomatic History of World War I (London: Weidenfeld & Nicolson, 1971; US edition as The Gentleman Negotiators: A Diplomatic History of World War I, New York: Macmillan, 1971)
- Twilight of the Habsburgs: The Collapse of the Austro-Hungarian Empire (London: BPC Unit 75, 1971)
- Prague Spring: A Report on Czechoslovakia 1968 (Harmondsworth: Penguin, 1969)
- The Merchant of Revolution: The Life of Alexander Israel Helpland (Parvus) 1867–1924 (with Winfried Scharlau, London: Oxford University Press, 1965)
- Nazi Propaganda (London: Oxford University Press, 1964; 2nd edn. 1973)
- The Break-Up of the Habsburg Empire 1914–1918: A Study in National and Social Revolution (London: Oxford University Press, 1961)
- Germany and the Revolution in Russia, 1915–1918: Documents from the Archives of the German Foreign Ministry (London: Oxford University Press, 1958)
