= Absorption (psychology) =

Personality trait

Absorption is a disposition or personality trait in which a person becomes absorbed in their mental imagery, particularly fantasy. This trait thus correlates highly with a fantasy prone personality. The original research on absorption was by Dutch American psychologist Auke Tellegen. The construct of absorption was developed in order to relate individual differences in hypnotisability to broader aspects of personality. Absorption has a variable correlation with hypnotisability (r = 0.13–0.89) perhaps because in addition to broad personality dispositions, situational factors play an important role in performance on tests of hypnotic susceptibility. Absorption is one of the traits assessed in the Multidimensional Personality Questionnaire.

== Measurement ==
Absorption is most commonly measured by the Tellegen Absorption Scale (TAS). Several versions of this scale are available, the most recent being by Graham Jamieson, who provides a copy of his modified scale. The TAS comprises nine content clusters or subscales:

- responsiveness to engaging stimuli
- responsiveness to inductive stimuli
- imagistic thought
- ability to summon vivid and suggestive images
- cross-modal experiences—e.g., synesthesia
- absorption in thoughts and imaginings
- vivid memories of the past
- episodes of expanded awareness
- altered states of consciousness

A 1991 study by Glisky et al. concluded that responsiveness to the engaging or inductive stimuli subscales of the TAS were more strongly related to hypnotisability than were imagistic thought, episodes of expanded awareness, or absorption in thoughts and imaginings.

A revised version of the TAS has been included in Tellegen's Multidimensional Personality Questionnaire (MPQ) in which it is considered both a primary and a broad trait. In the MPQ, absorption has two subscales called "sentient" and "prone to imaginative and altered states" respectively.

Tellegen has assigned copyright of TAS to the University of Minnesota Press (UMP). It was generally believed from the 1990s that the TAS was now in the public domain, and various improved versions were circulated. However, recently the UMP has reasserted its copyright, and regards these later versions to be unauthorised, and also disputes whether these versions are in fact improvements.

== Relationship to other personality traits ==
Absorption is strongly correlated with openness to experience. Studies using factor analysis have suggested that the fantasy, aesthetics, and feelings facets of the NEO PI-R Openness to Experience scale are closely related to absorption and predict hypnotisability, whereas the remaining three facet scales of ideas, actions, and values are largely unrelated to these constructs. Absorption is unrelated to extraversion or neuroticism. One study found a positive correlation between absorption and need for cognition. Absorption has a strong relationship to self-transcendence in the Temperament and Character Inventory.

== Emotional experience ==
Absorption can facilitate the experience of both positive and negative emotions. Positive experiences facilitated by absorption include the enjoyment of music, art, and natural beauty (e.g. sunsets) and pleasant forms of daydreaming. Absorption has also been linked to forms of maladjustment, such as nightmare frequency and anxiety sensitivity (fear of one's own anxiety symptoms), and dissociative symptoms. Absorption may act to amplify minor somatic symptoms, leading to an increased risk of conditions associated with hypersensitivity to internal bodily sensations, such as somatoform disorders and panic disorder. People may have a particular risk of the aforementioned problems when they are prone to both high absorption and to personality traits associated with negative emotionality.

== Altered states of consciousness ==
A core feature of absorption is an experience of focused attention wherein: "objects of absorbed attention acquire an importance and intimacy that are normally reserved for the self and may, therefore, acquire a temporary self-like quality. These object identifications have mystical overtones." This capacity for focused attention facilitates the experience of altered states of consciousness. In addition to individual differences in hypnotizability, absorption is associated with differential responses to other procedures for inducing altered states of consciousness, including meditation, marijuana use, and biofeedback. A review of studies on differential response to the drug psilocybin found that absorption had the largest effect of all the psychological variables assessed on the intensity of individual experiences of altered states of consciousness. Absorption was strongly associated with overall consciousness alteration and with mystical-type experiences and visual effects induced by psilocybin. Researchers have suggested that individual differences in both absorption and responsiveness to hallucinogenic drugs could be related to the binding potential of serotonin receptors (specifically 5-HT_{2A}) which are the main site of action of classic hallucinogens, such as LSD and psilocybin.

A series of studies has found that people higher in absorption have a greater propensity towards having religious experiences (also known as spiritual experiences), which may have a sensory-like character (e.g., reporting the Holy Spirit "rush" through them). Higher levels of absorption have been found to predict people reporting more and stronger mystical experiences when wearing a placebo version of a God helmet—that is, a helmet that supposedly induces spiritual experiences through magnetic stimulation of the temporal lobes of the brain but in fact provides no magnetic stimulation. Furthermore, in most studies people higher in absorption report experiencing greater levels of awe when viewing vast landscapes, art exhibitions, and other potentially awe-inducing things. Given these findings on spiritual experiences, placebo god helmets, and awe, the authors of a 2019 research paper suggest that higher levels of absorption may give individuals a greater "talent" for "experienc[ing] as real what must be imagined". The authors argue that this is a key aspect of most religious or spiritual traditions, while noting that they are not necessarily dismissing the reality of what is reported in spiritual experiences. Absorption is also found to be related to experiences of communication with spirits.

=== Dream recall ===
Research has found that frequency of dream recall is associated with absorption and related personality traits, such as openness to experience and proneness to dissociation. A proposed explanation is the continuity model of human consciousness. This model proposes that people who are prone to vivid and unusual experiences during the day, such as fantasy and daydreaming, will tend to have vivid and memorable dream content, and hence will be more likely to remember their dreams.

== See also ==
- Big lie
- Boundaries of the mind
- Depersonalization and derealization
- Fantasy prone personality
- Fantasy (psychology)
- Flow (psychology)
- Hyperfocus
- Hyperphantasia
- Occupational psychosis
- Paracosm
- Suggestibility
