= Creative Writers and Day-Dreaming =

1907 talk given by Sigmund Freud

"Creative Writers and Day-Dreaming" (German: Der Dichter und das Phantasieren) was an informal talk given in 1907 by Sigmund Freud, and subsequently published in 1908, on the relationship between unconscious phantasy and creative art.

Freud's argument – that artists, reviving memories of childhood daydreams and play activities, succeeded in making them acceptable through their aesthetic technique – was to be widely influential for modernism in the interwar period.

== Artistic sources ==
Freud began his talk by raising the question of where writers drew their material from, suggesting that children at play, and adults day-dreaming, both provided cognate activities to those of the literary artist. Heroic and erotic daydreams or preconscious phantasies in both men and women were seen by Freud as providing substitute satisfactions for everyday deprivations; and the same phantasies were in turn turned into shareable (public) artistic constructs by the creative writer, where they could serve as cultural surrogates for the universal instinctual renunciations inherent in civilization.

== Artistic technique ==
Freud saw the aesthetic principle as the ability to turn the private phantasy into a public artefact, using artistic pleasure to release a deeper pleasure founded on the release of forbidden (unconscious) material. The process allowed the writer him/herself to emerge from their introversion and return to the public world. If the phantasies came too close to the unconscious repressed, however, the process would fail, leading either to creative inhibition or to a rejection of the artwork itself.

Freud himself epitomised his essay's argument a decade later in his Introductory Lectures, stating of the true artist that:

he understands how to work over his daydreams in such a way as to make them lose what is too personal in them and repels strangers, and to make it possible for others to share in the enjoyment of them. He understands, too, how to tone them down so that they do not easily betray their origin from proscribed sources....he has thus achieved through his phantasy what originally he had achieved only in his phantasy – honour, power and the love of women.

== See also ==
- D. W. Winnicott
- Edmund Wilson
- F. Scott Fitzgerald
- Hanns Sachs
- Sublimation
