= Hyperphantasia =

Condition of having extremely vivid mental imagery

Hyperphantasia is the condition of having extremely vivid mental imagery. It is the opposite condition to aphantasia, where mental visual imagery is not present. The experience of hyperphantasia is more common than aphantasia and has been described as being "as vivid as real seeing". Hyperphantasia constitutes all five senses within vivid mental imagery, although literature on the subject is dominated by "visual" mental imagery research, with a lack of research on the other four senses. While Hyperphantasia is found to be more common in the population, that does not mean each individual with this condition experiences it the same. It is often viewed as more of a spectrum ranging between levels of detail and vividness.

Research into hyperphantasia is most commonly completed by self-report questionnaires, such as the Vividness of Visual Imagery Questionnaire (VVIQ), developed by David Marks in 1973, which evaluates the vividness of an individual's mental imagery out of a score of 80. Individuals scoring from 75 to 80 are deemed hyperphantasics and are estimated to constitute around 2.5% of the population.

== Mechanism ==
There is no reliably specific mental imagery cortical network; the formation of mental imagery involves many regions of the brain, as mental imagery shares many common brain regions with other cognitive functions. Neurological evidence has shown that in the creation of imagery, neural activity spans prefrontal, parietal, temporal and visual areas. Within the neuroscience of imagery, it is often split into three primary aspects: the triggering of imagery, its generation/manipulation, and the underlying vividness of the imagery.

The mechanism underlying the vividness of imagery which may explain conditions like hyperphantasia is controversial amongst the literature. The current findings of the mechanism of hyperphantasia are related to two regions of the brain: the early visual cortex and the frontal cortex.

Recent research has shown the relationship between the size (surface area) of the early visual cortex (V1-V3), specifically V1 and to a lesser degree V2 (but not V3), inversely predicts imagery strength within individuals. This relationship is evidenced across both clinical and non-clinical populations [see § Co-morbidity below].

There is a positive relationship between the surface area of the frontal cortex and visual imagery strength. This aligns with the reciprocal relationship between the size of primary visual cortices and frontal cortices, with a smaller V1 correlating to a larger frontal cortex. Within the general principle of human cortical organization, there is an anatomical trade-off between primary sensory cortices such as the primary visual cortex and frontal areas. Several lines of evidence suggest that the respective sizes of these areas within individuals predict their vividness of imagery. Additionally, genetics play a part in determining the surface area of V1, suggesting that genetics may indirectly contribute to hyperphantasia.

Beyond the size of these regions, there is evidence that lower resting activity and excitability levels within the primary visual cortex predicts stronger mental imagery and vice versa. This has been confirmed by artificially lowering the excitability of the visual cortex, which subsequently led to increased imagery strength. The relationship between the frontal lobe and the visual cortex form an 'imagery network' where the ratio in size and excitability of these two areas relate to imagery strength amongst individuals.

Neuroimaging studies using functional magnetic resonance imaging (fMRI) have additionally demonstrated that hyperphantasics have significantly stronger connectivity between their prefrontal cortices (Brodmann's areas 9, 10, 11 in particular) and their visual cortex in comparison to aphantasics.

The mechanism behind vivid imagery appears to come down to the size and excitability of the visual-occipital network and the frontal areas as well as the strength of connectivity between these brain regions. However, these factors can only explain the variations in mental imagery; the specific mechanisms that cause hyperphantasia are still not well documented.

== Impacts ==
=== Memory ===
Vivid mental imagery as observed in hyperphantasia impacts people's ability for "mental time travel", or the ability to remember past events as well as imagine future events. Hyperphantasics have reported more sensory details of episodic memories and future event constructions.

Episodic and autobiographical memories are reliant on sensory-perceptual data such as visual imagery. Concepts such as "flashbulb memories", which are powerful autobiographical memories that we often relive, are often built on vivid visual snapshots. Evidence has shown that individuals exhibiting increased imagery vividness also often recall autobiographical memories with richer descriptions as well as with more fluency. Additionally, disorders that affect vision and visual imagery such as aphantasia have been linked to autobiographical amnesia, depicting the importance of visual imagery to autobiographical recall. This relationship of imagery vividness and improved autobiographical memory recall is evidenced across both clinical and non-clinical populations.

There is a lack of research on the impacts of vivid mental imagery on imagining future events and possible scenarios (episodic future thinking); however, research has shown that increased vivid imagery will predict the "clarity of spatial context, the feeling of emotions, and the intensity and personal importance of the events". This implies that hyperphantasics may be better at planning for the future and predicting how events may impact them. Additionally, this explains why vivid imagery helps with perceptual acuity. Research has shown that higher VVIQ scores predict rapid and more precise decision-making in the face of a threat.

As this condition touches into all five senses that produce memory recall: hearing, taste, end even touch, those with hyperphantasia have also reported that this can play a major role in their everyday lives in areas such as emotional processing and even relationships. The vividness of such a process potentially playing a key role in their mental health.

=== Personality ===
Hyperphantasia has been shown to be associated with higher levels of "openness" in the Big Five personality traits, using the NEO personality inventory. This entails more openness to "new experiences, broad interests, an active imagination and a likelihood of experiencing positive and negative emotions more keenly than other people".

== Co-morbidity ==
Vivid imagery has been correlated to several mood disorders, particularly anxiety, obsessive–compulsive disorder, major depressive disorder, and bipolar disorder. Having hyperphantasia may worsen symptoms of such disorders by increasing ruminating thoughts, as well as acting as an "emotional amplifier". For example, vivid "flash-forwards" to suicidal acts may increase occurrences of suicide.

The vividness of mental imagery has a key role in the development and continuation of intrusive memories, so for those with post-traumatic stress disorder (PTSD), having hyperphantasia is a substantial risk factor. Both schizophrenia and Parkinson's disease also may be aggravated by hyperphantasia, as high levels of vivid imagery predict the severity of visual hallucinations. In fact, it is possible that hyperphantasia is a "trait maker" for schizophrenia, with both disorders being associated with a smaller primary visual cortex. Individuals with schizophrenia have a 25% volume reduction of their primary visual cortex (V1) and its total number of neurons.

Additionally, a 2008 study found a connection between hyperphantasia and synesthesia. Sampling a large group of synesthetes, they found that individuals with synesthesia reported more vivid mental images than control groups.

== See also ==
- Absorption (psychology)
- Boundaries of the mind
- Fantasy-prone personality
