= Australian Sheep-Goat Scale =

Questionnaire rating belief in the paranormal

The Australian Sheep-Goat Scale (ASGS) is a questionnaire conceived by Michael Thalbourne to determine the extent to which the respondent believes in the paranormal.

The version of the scale most commonly used in research (Thalbourne, 1995) has 18 items, such as "I believe in the existence of ESP", "I have had at least one dream that came true and which (I believe) was not just a coincidence", "I believe in life after death" and "I believe in the existence of psychokinesis (or PK)—that is, the direct influence of mind on a physical system, without the mediation of any known physical energy". The possible answers are "true", "uncertain" and "false", which score two points, one point and zero points, respectively. The sum of the points given to the 18 items is the total ASGS score, which ranges from 0 through 36.

The criterion for item selection is whether the topic contravenes philosopher C. D. Broad's "Basic Limiting Principles", which set limits on the existence and operation of mind in a mathematically describable universe; the scale does not include items on astrology, cryptozoological creatures, or extraterrestrial intelligence, to name a few anomalies. While the above-described version of the scale—the Forced Choice version—is the most popular, there are alternative versions; the most-frequently found are the visual analogue scale version and the Rasch scaled version. There is some evidence that these three versions yield approximately the same answers to research questions.

A background paper concerning scale construction and empirical findings with the ASGS has been published. The description "Australian" is given because the test was devised in Adelaide, South Australia, and to distinguish it from other nations' instruments (such as the Icelandic Sheep-Goat Scale). A person who believes in some aspect of the paranormal is termed a "sheep", and a disbeliever a "goat" (after The Sheep and the Goats, the New Testament simile in Matthew 25:31 about Christ separating the people as a shepherd separates the sheep from the goats).

A relationship between narcissistic personality and paranormal belief was discovered in a study involving the Australian Sheep-Goat Scale. A 2011 study into the relationship between coincidence and paranormal belief using the Australian Sheep-Goat Scale revealed "significant interaction effect between Sheep-Goat score and type of coincidence, suggesting that people with lower thresholds of surprise, when experiencing coincidences, harbor higher paranormal belief than those with a higher threshold."
