= Thinking about the immortality of the crab =

Spanish idiom about daydreaming

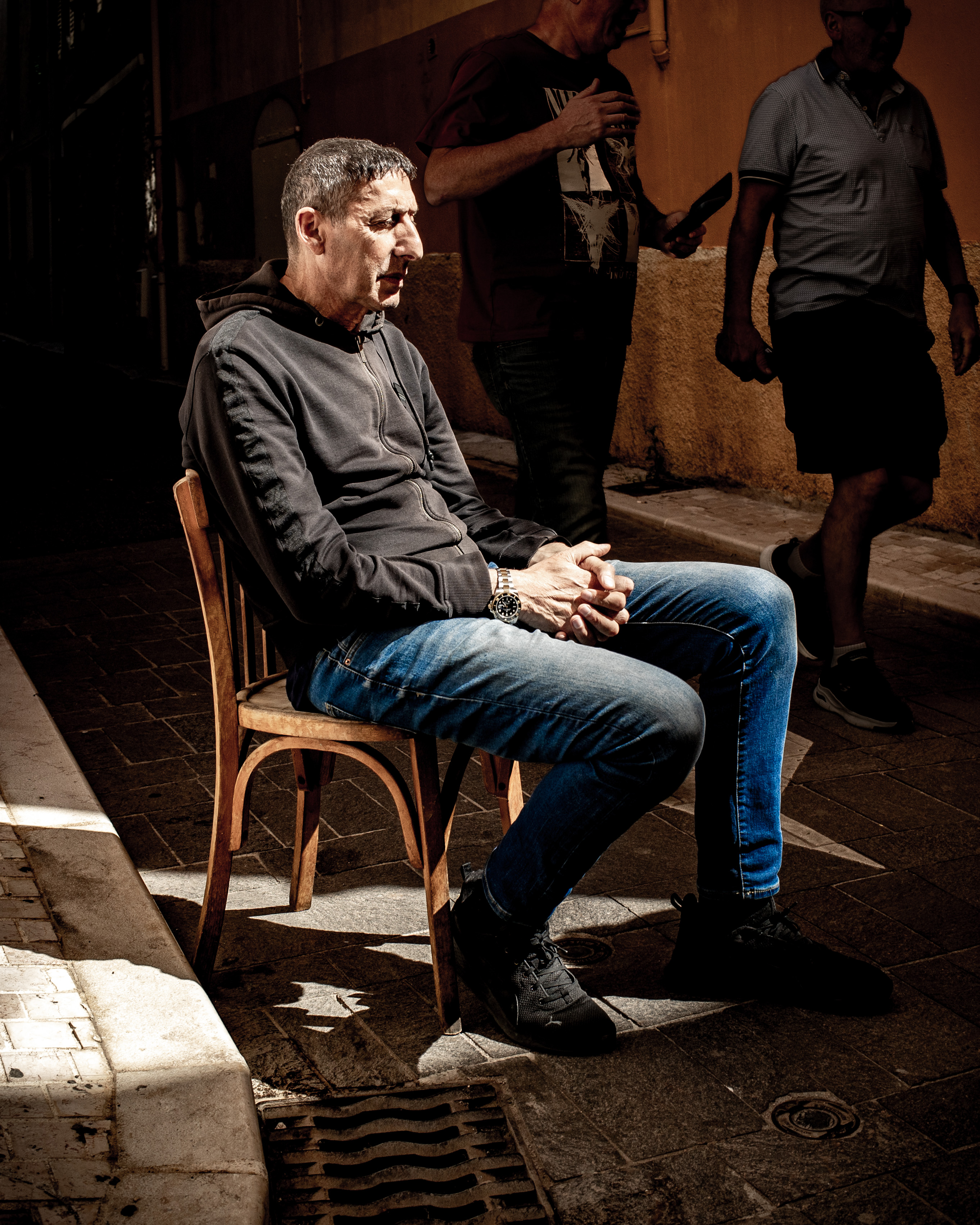
A person daydreaming may be said to be "thinking about the immortality of the crab"

"Thinking about the immortality of the crab" (Spanish: Pensando en la inmortalidad del cangrejo) is a Spanish idiom referring to the act of daydreaming. It is a humorous way to say that one was not sitting idly but engaged constructively in contemplation or letting one's mind wander.

The phrase is usually used to express that an individual was daydreaming, "When I have nothing to do I think about the immortality of the crab" (Cuando no tengo nada que hacer, pienso en la inmortalidad del cangrejo). It is also used to wake someone from a daydream; "are you thinking about the immortality of the crab?" (¿Estás pensando en la inmortalidad del cangrejo?)

== In poetry ==
¿En qué piensas?
—Nada, en la inmortalidad del cangrejo.

— Anonimo, Los mexicanos pintados por sí mismos
Translation:

"What are you thinking about?"
"Nothing. On the immortality of the crab."

— Anonymous, Mexican Self-portraits (1855)

Inmortalidad del cangrejo

Y de inmortalidades sólo creo
en la tuya, cangrejo amigo.
Te aplastan,
te echan en agua hirviendo,
inundan tu casa.
Pero la represión y la tortura
de nada sirven, de nada.

No tú, cangrejo ínfimo,
caparazón mortal de tu individuo, ser transitorio,
carne fugaz que en nuestros dientes se quiebra;
no tú sino tu especie eterna: los otros:
el cangrejo inmortal
toma la playa.

Translation:

The immortality of the crab

Of all the immortalities, I believe in
only yours, friend crab.
People break into your body,
plop you into boiling water,
flush you out of house and home.
But torture and affliction
Make no apparent end of you. No...

Not you, poor despicable crab -
brief tenant in this mortal carapace
of your individuality; fleeting creature
of flesh that quails between our teeth;
Not you but others of your eternal species:
infinite crab:
take over the beach.

— José Emilio Pacheco

Inmortalidad del cangrejo

El más profundo problema:
el de la inmortalidad
del cangrejo, que tiene alma,
Una almita de verdad ...

Que si el cangrejo se muere
todo en su totalidad
con él nos morimos todos
por toda la eternidad

Translation:

The immortality of the crab

The deepest problem:
of the immortality of the crab,
is that a soul it has,
a little soul in fact ...

That if the crab dies
entirely in its totality
with it we all die
for all of eternity

— Miguel de Unamuno

== In literature ==
Dominican poet and writer Edgar Smith wrote a novel in Spanish called La inmortalidad del cangrejo, about a man who, tired of suffering in life, decides to kill himself, but, after three failed attempts, starts to wonder if he can die at all. The novel was critically acclaimed in Hispanic circles. It was officially released in January 2015 in the Dominican Republic, then it was presented at the Hamilton Grange Library in the United States in June.

== In film ==
- Sena/Quina, la inmortalidad del cangrejo – 2005 film by Paolo Agazzi

== Variants ==
The idiom is about daydreaming. Similar phrases are used in various languages and it may vary depending on the country.

- Czech: přemýšlet o nesmrtelnosti chrousta – thinking about the immortality of the maybug.
- Slovak: rozmýšľať nad nesmrteľnosťou chrústa – thinking about the immortality of the maybug (chrúst).
- Finnish: istun ja mietin syntyjä syviä – sitting and wondering about the world's early origins.
- Latvian: lidināties pa mākoņiem - to fly around clouds; often lidināties ir substituted by staigāt (to walk) or dzīvot (to live).
- Polish: myśleć o niebieskich migdałach – literally, "thinking about blue almonds"; sometimes myśleć is replaced with śnić or marzyć, changing the meaning to "dreaming about blue almonds".
- Portuguese: pensando na morte da bezerra – thinking about the death of the calf.
- Romanian: a se gândi la nemurirea sufletului – thinking about the immortality of the soul.
- Colombian Spanish: echando globos – blowing balloons. Also, pensando en los huevos del gallo ("thinking about the rooster's eggs"), a double entendre with chicken eggs and rooster testicles.
- Venezuelan Spanish: pensando en pajaritos preñados – thinking about pregnant birds.
- Peruvian Spanish: pensando en la inmortalidad del mosquito – thinking about the immortality of the mosquito

== See also ==
- Saying
- Paremiology
- Spanish proverbs
