= Michael Thalbourne =

Australian psychologist

Michael Anthony Thalbourne (24 March 1955 – 4 May 2010, Adelaide, South Australia) was an Australian psychologist who worked in the field of parapsychology. He was educated at the University of Adelaide and the University of Edinburgh. His books include: A glossary of terms used in parapsychology (2003), The common thread between ESP and PK (2004), and Parapsychology in the Twenty-First Century: Essays on the future of Psychical Research (2005).

== Education and career ==
Thalbourne obtained his B.A. (Hons) at the University of Adelaide, South Australia, in 1976, and his PhD in parapsychology at Edinburgh University in 1981.

From 1980 through 1987 when it closed Thalbourne researched at the McDonnell Laboratory for Psychical Research at Washington University in St. Louis.

Thalbourne was a visiting research fellow at the University of Adelaide from 1992 until 2007, and was president of the Australian Institute of Parapsychological Research. He was editor of the Australian Journal of Parapsychology.

== Research ==
Thalbourne extensively researched the psychology of belief in the paranormal, as well as attempted to elicit the paranormal itself under laboratory conditions. In the 1990s he wrote on the concept of transliminality; his early work suggesting that this could be a trait linking such personality variables as belief in the paranormal, creative personality, mystical experience and psychopathology led him to describe this as a "common thread" linking these variables. His later work looked at the relationship between religiosity, dream-interpretation and transliminality and also how transliminality may relate to traits such as psychoticism.

Thalbourne constructed a questionnaire which, as with Hood's M-Scale, assesses mystical experience, called the Mystical Experience Scale. Thalbourne also collaborated on empirical research projects with Erlendur Haraldsson, and developed the Australian Sheep-Goat Scale, a measure of the extent to which a person believes in the paranormal.

Thalbourne also conducted research into kundalini. He published a scale to assess the kundalini experience with the world-renowned expert on panic attacks, Bronwyn Fox. More recently, he used a random number generator in connection with kundalini. In his paper of 2006, he stated that he understands the term "Kundalini" to mean "the coiled one", and he refers to research into the near-death experience in connection with kundalini, and also refers to the Physio-Kundalini Scale, the 19-item scale devised by Bruce Greyson to assess kundalini experience.

== Publications ==
=== Books ===
- Thalbourne, M.A. (1982). A glossary of terms used in parapsychology. London: Heinemann.
- Thalbourne, M.A. (2003). A glossary of terms used in parapsychology. 2nd ed. Charlottesville, VA: Puente Press.
- Thalbourne, M.A. (2004). The common thread between ESP and PK. New York: Parapsychology Foundation.
- Thalbourne, M.A., & Storm, L. (Eds).(2005). Parapsychology in the Twenty-First Century: Essays on the future of Psychical Research. Jefferson, NC: McFarland. ISBN 0-7864-1938-5 (pbk.)
- Storm, L., & Thalbourne, M.A. (Eds.). (2006). The survival of human consciousness: Essays on the possibility of life after death. Jefferson, NC: McFarland. ISBN 0-7864-2772-8 (pbk.)

=== Selected articles ===
Thalbourne has been published in all the major English-speaking parapsychological journals:

- Thalbourne, M.A. (2009). Things that go bump, by day and by night: An expectancy effect? Australian Journal of Parapsychology, 9, 97-109.
- Thalbourne, M.A. (2009). Some notes on consciousness and claims of psi. Paranormal Review, No. 51, 21–22.
- Campos, R.C., Gonçalves, B., & Thalbourne, M.[A.] (2009). Preliminary psychometric data for a Portuguese scale to assess history of depressive symptomatology with a college student sample. Psychological Reports, 104, 1015–1018.
- Goretzki, M., Thalbourne, M.A., & Storm, L. (2009). The questionnaire measurement of spiritual emergency. Journal of Transpersonal Psychology, 41, 81–97.
- Thalbourne, M.A. (2009). Reports of paranormal experiences: Can transliminality tell us anything about them? Archive for the Psychology of Religion, 31, 375–386.
- Thalbourne, M.A. (2009). Transliminality, anomalous belief and experience, and hypnotizability. Australian Journal of Clinical and Experimental Hypnosis, 37, 45–56.
- Thalbourne, M. A. (2009). Book review of Michael A. Jawer's The Spiritual Anatomy of Emotion. How Feelings Link the Brain, the Body, and the Sixth Sense. Australian Journal of Parapsychology, 9, 215–219.
- Thalbourne, M. A. (2009). Book review of Harvey J. Irwin's The Psychology of Paranormal Belief. A researcher's handbook. Australian Journal of Parapsychology, 9, 219–223.
