= Auke Tellegen =

Dutch-born American psychologist (1930–2024)

- Born: July 16, 1930; Batavia, Dutch East Indies
- Died: March 11, 2024 (aged 93); Arden Hills, Minnesota, U.S.
- Education: University of Minnesota
- Scientific career
- Fields: Clinical Psychology, personality, behavior genetics
- Workplaces: University of Minnesota
- Thesis: The Effect of Genetic and Experiential Factors Upon Emotional Reactions in Mice (1962)
- Academic advisors: Gardner Lindzey
- Doctoral students: James V. Haxby, David Watson, Wendy Slutske

Auke Tellegen (July 16, 1930 – March 11, 2024) was a Dutch-born American psychologist known for his contributions to personality psychology. He was a professor of psychology at the University of Minnesota from 1968 to 1999 where he helped develop the Multidimensional Personality Questionnaire and contributed to the Minnesota Multiphasic Personality Inventory.

== Early life and education ==
Tellegen was born in Batavia, the capital of the Dutch East Indies, in 1930. He received his PhD in clinical psychology from the University of Minnesota in 1962 and did post-doctoral study in clinical psychology at the University of Minnesota Medical School.

== Research ==
Tellegen, alongside David Lykken, studied the effects that genetics had on a person's happiness.

=== Absorption ===
Tellegen proposed the personality trait of absorption. In 1974 he developed the Tellegen Absorption Scale (TAS) with Gilbert Atkinson, which he revised in 1982 and 1992.

== Awards ==
- Bruno Klopfer Award, 2000
- Jack Block Award, 2001
- APA Award for Distinguished Contributions to Assessment Psychology, 2012
