= The Yearning =

The Yearning may refer to:

== Albums ==
- The Yearning (Things of Stone and Wood album), 1993
- The Yearning (Aisles album), 2005

== See also ==
- Yearning (disambiguation)
