= James V. Haxby =

American neuroscientist

- Born: James Van Loan Haxby; May 20, 1951 (age 74); Minneapolis, MN, U.S.
- Known for: Neural decoding, face perception
- Awards: Fulbright Scholarship, NIH Director's Award, Cognitive Neuroscience Society Fred Kavli Distinguished Career Contributions Award
- Scientific career
- Fields: Cognitive neuroscience
- Institutions: Dartmouth College
- Thesis: Comprehension and Retention of Prose in Alcoholic Korsakoff's Syndrome (1981)
- Doctoral advisor: Auke Tellegen
- Website: haxbylab.dartmouth.edu/ppl/jim.html

James Van Loan Haxby is an American neuroscientist. He currently is a professor in the Department of Psychological and Brain Sciences at Dartmouth College and was the Director for the Dartmouth Center for Cognitive Neuroscience from 2008 to 2021. He is best known for his work on face perception and applications of machine learning in functional neuroimaging.

== Education ==
Haxby received a BA from Carleton College in 1973 and completed a Fulbright Scholarship at the University of Bonn in 1974. He obtained a PhD in clinical psychology at the University of Minnesota in 1981.

== Career ==
After receiving his PhD, Haxby held several clinical psychology positions at the Minneapolis VA Medical Center. Starting in 1982, Haxby began a two-decade tenure at the National Institutes of Health, working as a research psychologist at the National Institute on Aging and later as chief of the Section on Functional Brain Imaging at the National Institute of Mental Health. In 2002, Haxby began a professorship in the Department of Psychology at Princeton University, and in 2008 became the Evans Family Distinguished Professor of Psychological and Brain Sciences at Dartmouth College. He is currently the director of the Dartmouth Brain Imaging Center and the Center for Cognitive Neuroscience at Dartmouth,

Haxby's scientific contributions span several topics in cognitive neuroscience. He has published numerous papers using functional neuroimaging to investigate the cortical organization underlying visual perception and semantic memory. He has also proposed an influential model of face perception where certain brain areas process invariant face properties such identity, while others process dynamic features critical for social interaction, such as emotional expressions and eye gaze. Haxby has played a critical role in introducing machine learning methods to functional magnetic resonance imaging (fMRI) data analysis. This approach was popularized by a paper demonstrating that neural representations of faces and object categories are encoded in a distributed fashion in human ventral temporal cortex, a position that is typically contrasted with more modular accounts of the functional neuroanatomy of face processing. More recently, Haxby's research has focused on the cortical topographies mediating fine-grained semantic representation, methods for functional brain alignment, and using naturalistic stimuli (e.g., movies) to build computational models of neural representation that are common across individuals. He is a vocal proponent of open science.
