= Ernest Hartmann =

American psychiatrist (1934–2013)

Ernest Hartmann (1934 – 7 August 2013) was an American psychoanalyst and sleep researcher. He is known for pioneering sleep and dream studies, incorporating neurophysiology, endocrinology, and biochemistry into his work.

== Life and career ==
Hartmann was born on Feb 25, 1934, in Vienna, Austria. His father was Heinz Hartmann (1894–1970), a widely known psychoanalyst and one of the founders of ego psychology, and his mother was Dora (Karplus) Hartmann (1902–1974), a pediatrician, psychiatrist, and psychoanalyst. He had one brother, Lawrence, born in 1937. In 1938, the family left Vienna, due to the rise of Nazism, and went to Paris and then to Switzerland; they finally settled in New York City in 1941, where EH graduated from the Ethical Culture Fieldston School in 1951. EH went on to the University of Chicago, and then the Yale University School of Medicine, where he received his M.D. in 1958. After an internship at Einstein, he did his residency in psychiatry at Massachusetts Mental Health Center, and went on to do research on sleep at the National Institute of Mental Health.

Hartmann began his career as an assistant clinical professor of psychiatry at Tufts University School of Medicine in Boston from 1964 to 1966, then as an assistant professor of psychiatry from 1966 to 1969, before properly becoming a professor in 1975, one of only three full professors at the School of Medicine at that time. He held that position until he retired from Tufts in 2013.

Hartmann was the former president of the International Association for the Study of Dreams and the founding editor for their journal, Dreaming. He served as lieutenant commander in the US Public Health Service from 1962 to 1964 and held multiple high-level positions in tandem with his duties at Tufts, including but not limited to, directing the Sleep and Dream Laboratory in the Boston State Hospital from 1964 to 1980, the Sleep Laboratory at the West-Ros-Park Mental Health Centre, and the Sleep Disorders Center at the Newton-Wellesly Hospital.

During his career as a researcher of sleep and dreams for 55 years, he published more than 350 articles and 9 books while giving a myriad of presentations and talks across the world. In 1967, Hartmann published his first book called The Biology of Dreaming.

Hartmann was married twice, first to Barbara Snow Hengst, from 1961 to 1974, then to Eva Neumann, from 1995 to 1999; both of these marriages ended in divorce. He had two children with Barbara Snow Hengst; Jonathan Hartmann, born 1966, and Katherine Hartmann. born 1968

Hartmann lived in Newton Highlands, Massachusetts. He died in Truro, Massachusetts, on the 7th of August, 2013 as a result of heart failure, at the age of 79.

== Selected works ==
- The Functions of Sleep. New Haven, CT: Yale University Press. 1973. ISBN 9780300017014
- Boundaries in the Mind: A New Psychology of Personality. New York: Basic Books, 1991. ISBN 9780465007394
- The Nature and Functions of Dreaming. Oxford University Press, 2010. ISBN 9780199751778
- Boundaries: A New Way to Look at the World. Summerland, CA: CIRCC EverPress, 2011. ISBN 9780983071808
