= Daydreaming =

Aspect of human thought and consciousness

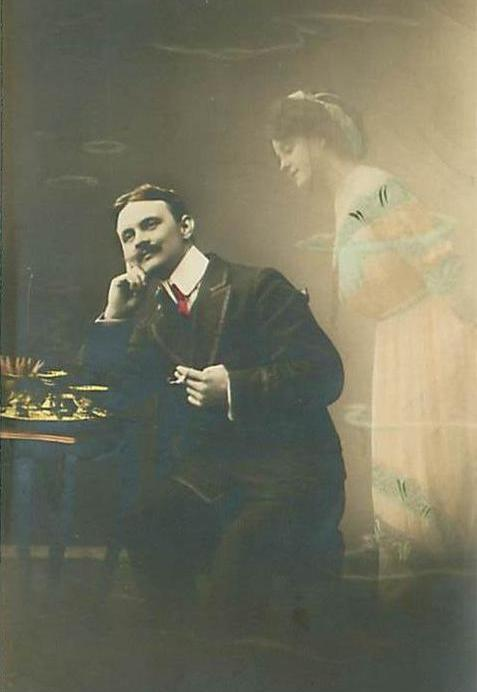
1912 postcard illustrating the concept of a man daydreaming about a woman

Daydreaming is a stream of consciousness that detaches from current external tasks when one's attention becomes focused on a more personal and internal direction.

Various names of this phenomenon exist, including mind-wandering, fantasies, and spontaneous thoughts. There are many types of daydreams – however, the most common characteristic to all forms of daydreaming meets the criteria for mild dissociation. In addition, the impacts of the various types of daydreams are not identical. While some are disruptive and deleterious, others may be beneficial to some degree.

Clinical psychologist Jerome L. Singer's research on the subject created the foundation for nearly all subsequent modern scholarship. The terminologies assigned by modern researchers brings about challenges centering on identifying the common features of daydreaming and building collective work among researchers.

== Characteristics and types of daydreaming ==
Daydreaming consists of self-generated thoughts comprising three distinct categories: thoughts concerning the future and oneself, reflections on the past and others, and the emotional tone of experiences.

Psychologist Jerome L. Singer established three different types of daydreaming and their characteristics, varying in their cognitive states and emotional experiences. These included positive constructive daydreaming, characterized by constructive engagement, planning, pleasant thoughts, vivid imagery, and curiosity; guilty-dysphoric daydreaming, marked by obsessive, guilt-ridden, and anguished fantasies; and poor attentional control, reflecting difficulty focusing on either internal thoughts or external tasks.

Different daydreaming styles have various effects on certain behaviours, such as creativity.

== Functions of daydreaming ==
=== Future thinking ===
Daydreaming can be a useful tool to help keep people mindful of their relevant goals, such as imagining future success of a goal to motivate accomplishing a difficult or uninteresting task.

=== Creative thinking ===
This function of daydreaming is associated with increased creativity in individuals. The frequency of daydreaming is the highest during simple tasks. It is hypothesized that daydreaming plays an important role in generating creative problem-solving processes. Studies have found that intentional daydreaming is more effective when focused on creative thought processing, rather than spontaneous or disruptive daydreams.

=== Attentional cycling ===
Attentional cycling is an adaptive function of daydreaming through which a person’s attention may cycle through multiple target problems at the same time, helping the individual remain positive. When people have a variety of goals, daydreaming can provide an opportunity for people to alternate across different streams of information and thoughts in a healthy way.

=== Dishabituation ===
A change in the daydreaming state can lead to dishabituation, a function that can be beneficial during a learning process as it renews attention and interest in stimuli that have become repetitive. One research identified this effect in learning and showed that learning is more effective with distributed practices over time rather than massed practices all at once. Daydreaming can provide a break to allow thoughts to drift away from intensive learning; upon the return, continuing to focus on attention-demanding tasks will be easier.

=== Relief from boredom ===
When people are performing mundane tasks, daydreaming allows their thoughts to detach from current external tasks to relieve boredom. At the same time, this temporary detachment will not stop external activities completely when they are necessary. As a result, daydreaming can cause the perception that time moves more quickly.

=== Visualizing social scenarios ===
Daydreaming can also be used to imagine social situations. Social daydreaming is imagining past social occurrences and future events and conversations. According to research, daydreaming and social cognition have strong overlapping similarities when activated portions of the brain are observed. These findings indicate that daydreaming is an extension of the brain's experience of social cognition. This is likely because daydreams are often focused on the mental representations of social events, experiences, and people.

The correlation between social daydreaming and positive social relationships suggests that daydreaming about close others can enhance social well-being, reduce loneliness, and increase relationship satisfaction. Recent studies indicate that social daydreaming serves immediate socio-emotional regulation purposes, particularly in fostering feelings of love and connection, suggesting its adaptive role in achieving goals.

=== Default mode network ===
According to several studies, daydreaming appears to be the brain's default setting when no other external task is occupying its attention. A group of regions in the brain called the default mode network is lit up only when the brain is left in a sort of "idle" state. These areas of the brain light up in sequence only when daydreaming.

== Functional theories ==
There has yet to be a consensus on how the process of mind wandering occurs. Three theories have been devised to explain the occurrences and reasons behind why people daydream. These theories are the distractibility account, executive-function account, and the decoupling account.

The distractibility account theorizes that distracting stimuli, whether internal or external, reflect a failure to disregard or control distractions in the mind. According to this theory, the brain activity increases in response to an increase in attention to mind-wandering and the mind tends to dwell on task unrelated thoughts (TUT's).

The executive-function account theorizes that the mind fails to correctly process task relevant events. This theory is based on the observation of TUT causes an increase in errors regarding task focused thinking, especially tasks requiring executive control.

The decoupling account suggests that attention becomes removed, or decoupled, from perceptual information involving an external task, and couples to an internal process. In this process, TUT is enhanced as internal thoughts are disengaged from surrounding distractions as the participant ‘tunes out’ the surrounding environment.

== Psychological studies and research ==
=== Nighttime dreams ===
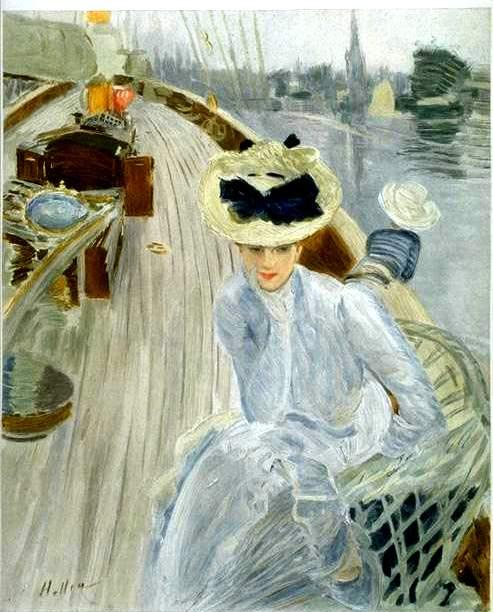
Daydream by Paul César Helleu

Freudian psychology interpreted daydreaming as an expression of the repressed instincts, similarly to those revealing themselves in nighttime dreams. In contrast to nighttime dreams, there seems to be a process of "secondary revision" in fantasies that makes them more lucid, like daydreaming. The state of daydreaming is a kind of liminal state between waking (with the ability to think rationally and logically) and sleeping.

=== Self-reflection ===
Daydreaming can also be used to reveal personal aspects about an individual. In an experiment directed by Robert Desoille, subjects were asked to imagine different objects over the course of different rounds. Those who imagined more details and sleek objects often saw themselves as more useful and held the belief that they were more capable of growth. Through the daydream, which involved many fantastical elements, characteristics such as a fear of men or a desire to subdue a selfish personality trait were often revealed.

Self-focused daydreaming can be positive (i.e. a self-reflection) or negative (i.e. a rumination). This will result in either increased happiness, anti-depressant thinking, rational planning, creativity, and positivism, or conversely, over-thinking negative experiences from the past, pessimistic views of the future, negative mood-episodes, guilt, fear, and poor attention controls.

A 2010 Harvard study found that people spend nearly 47% of their waking hours daydreaming.

=== Everyday use ===
Eric Klinger's research in the 1980s showed that most daydreams are about ordinary, everyday events and help to remind us of mundane tasks. Klinger's research also showed that over 75% of workers in "boring jobs", such as lifeguards and truck drivers, use vivid daydreams to "ease the boredom" of their routine tasks.

The brain's default mode network (DMN) becomes active during daydreaming, facilitating introspection and self-referential thought.

== Drawbacks and benefits ==
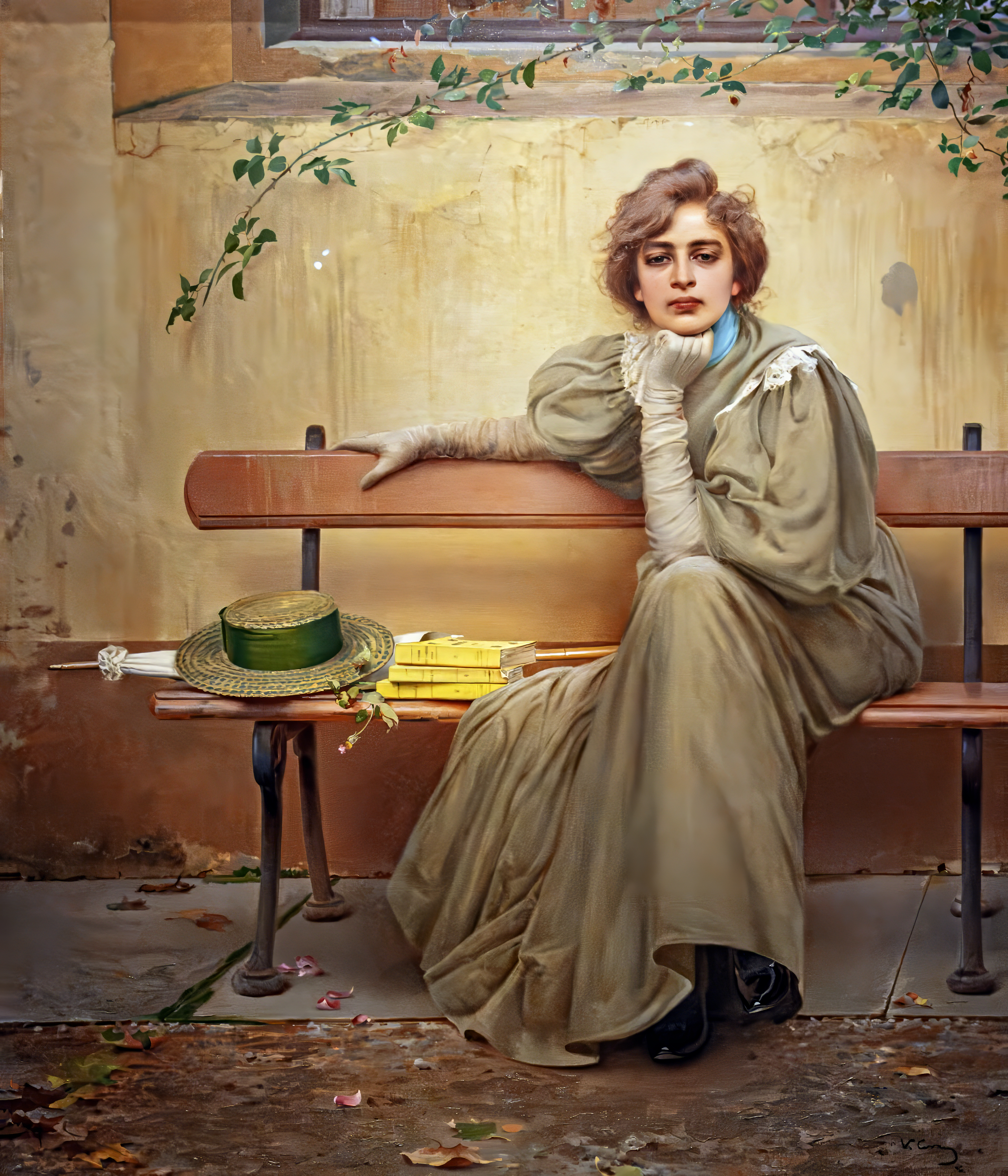
Vittorio Matteo Corcos, Dreams, 1896

The negative consequences of daydreaming on reading performance have been studied most thoroughly. Research shows that there is a negative correlation between daydreaming frequency and reading comprehension performance, specifically worsened item-specific comprehension and model-building ability. Other drawbacks can include reduced sustained attention and, at times, worsened mood.

Positive constructive daydreaming is associated with enhanced creativity and problem-solving abilities.

Disruptive daydreams or spontaneous daydreaming is also characteristic of people with attention-deficit hyperactive disorder (ADHD).

Negative mood is another association of daydreaming. Research finds people generally report lower happiness when they are daydreaming than when they are not. For those experiencing positive daydreaming, the same happiness rating is reported between current tasks and pleasant things they are more likely to daydream about. This finding remains true across all activities.

In the late 19th century, Toni Nelson argued that some daydreams with grandiose fantasies are self-gratifying attempts at "wish fulfillment". In the 1950s, some educational psychologists warned parents not to let their children daydream, for fear that the children may be sucked into "neurosis and even psychosis".

While the cost of daydreaming is more thoroughly discussed, the associated benefit is understudied. One potential reason is the payoff of daydreaming is usually private and hidden compared to the measurable cost from external goal-directed tasks. It is hard to know and record people's private thoughts such as personal goals and dreams, so whether daydreaming supports these thoughts is difficult to discuss.

Select research has argued that the mind is not idle during daydreaming, though it is at rest when not attentively engaging in external tasks. Rather, during this process, people indulge themselves in and reflect on fantasies, memories, future goals and psychological selves while still being able to control enough attention to keep easy tasks going and monitor the external environment. Thus, the potential benefits are the skills of internal reflection developed in daydreaming to connect emotional implication of daily life experience with personal meaning building process.

Despite the detrimental impact of daydreaming on aptitude tests which most educational institutions put heavy emphasis on, scholars argue that it is important for children to get internal reflection skills from daydreaming. Research shows that children equipped with these skills have higher academic ability and are socially and emotionally better off.

== Related disorders ==
Besides believing that daydreaming is motivated by unconscious drives and desires, Sigmund Freud also acknowledges that daydreaming can become excessive or pathological in some cases. Such instances can manifest as hysteria, neurosis, and psychopathology. When daydreaming becomes too detached from reality or interferes with everyday functioning, it may be indicative of deeper psychological issues or neurotic conflicts. While Freud didn’t explicitly correlate daydreaming to mental illness, he suggests that certain types of daydreams reflect underlying psychological disturbances.

Various studies have also focused on maladaptive daydreaming, which describes vivid and elaborate daydreams for prolonged periods of time. Individuals who are affected by maladaptive daydreaming often neglect their real-life relationships and obligations, leading to clinical distress and impaired functioning. According to research the most common comorbidities associated with maladaptive daydreaming include attention deficit hyperactivity disorder, anxiety disorders, major depressive disorder, obsessive–compulsive disorder, schizotypal personality disorder and schizoid personality disorder.

== Criticism and limitations ==
Research on daydreaming faces challenges due to the difficulty in observing and measuring it compared to other mental tasks. Instead of making broad conclusions about its benefits or drawbacks, researchers should focus on how the content and form of daydreams relate to specific adaptive outcomes. This involves using intensive longitudinal methods to track daydreams in real-world settings and linking them to measurable goals. Integration with social psychological theory can help understand how social daydreams impact social interactions and goal achievement. Combining neuroimaging studies with experience-sampling studies can offer insights into the neural mechanisms underlying the effects of daydreaming on social navigation.

== See also ==
- Creative visualization
- Creative Writers and Day-Dreaming
- Fantasy prone personality
- Fantasy (psychology)
- Maladaptive daydreaming
- Stream of consciousness (psychology)
- Thinking about the immortality of the crab – Spanish idiom about daydreaming
