= Yearning =

Yearning may refer to:

- Yearning (1964 film), a Japanese film directed by Mikio Naruse
- Yearning (1990 film), an Armenian drama film
- Yearning (1993 film), a Japanese film
- Yearning (album), a 1994 album by Robert Rich and Lisa Moskow
- Yearning (band), an atmospheric doom metal band from Finland
- "Yearning" (song), a 1957 song by George Jones and Jeanette Hicks

== See also ==
- The Yearning (disambiguation)
