= Fantasy (psychology) =

Mental faculty of drawing imagination and desire in the human brain

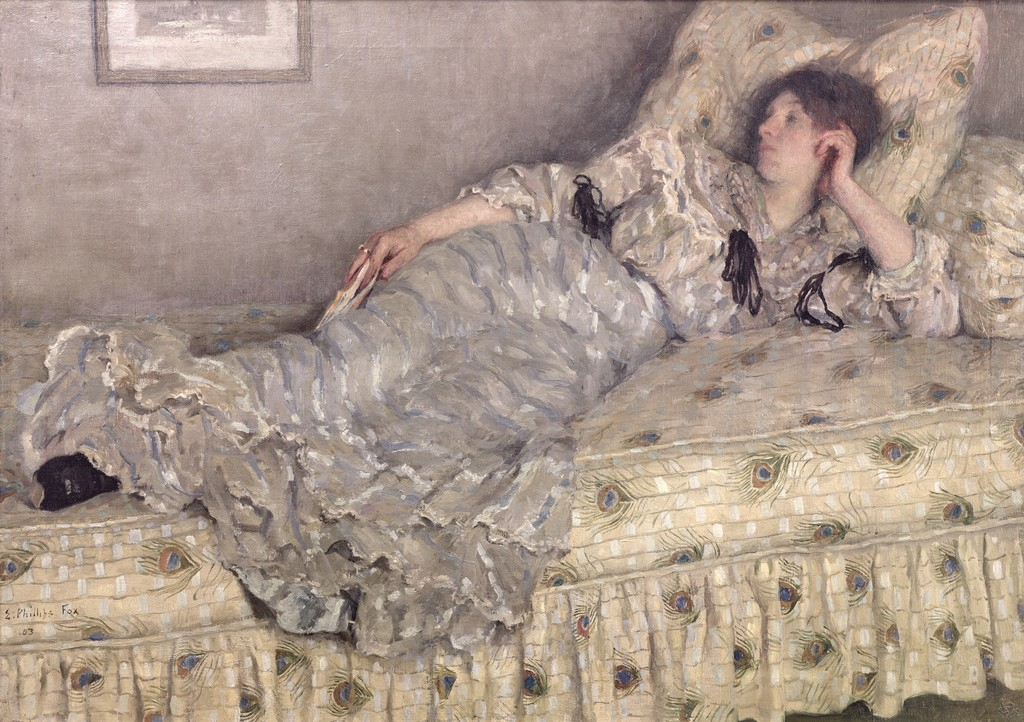
Rêverie (Daydream), 1903, by Emmanuel Phillips Fox

In psychoanalytic theory, fantasy is a broad range of mental experiences, mediated by the faculty of imagination in the human brain, generally consisting of scenarios that are impossible or unlikely to happen. Often, they are an expression of certain desires through vivid mental imagery.

Sexual fantasies are a common type of fantasy.

== Overview ==
In everyday life, individuals often find their thoughts "pursue a series of fantasies concerning things they wish they could do or wish they had done."

George Eman Vaillant in his study of defence mechanisms took as a central example of "an immature defence ... fantasy — living in a 'Walter Mitty' dream world where you imagine you are successful and popular, instead of making real efforts to make friends and succeed at a job."

According to Otto Fenichel, fantasy provides "small regressions and compensatory wish fulfilments which are recuperative in effect." More modern studies have found that fantasy has beneficial effects on empathy. Research by Deirdre Barrett reports that people differ radically in the vividness, as well as frequency of fantasy, and that those who have the most elaborately developed fantasy life are often the people who make productive use of their imaginations in art, literature, or by being especially creative and innovative in more traditional professions.

== Freud on fantasy ==
According to Sigmund Freud, a fantasy is constructed around multiple, often repressed wishes, and employs disguise to mask and mark the very defensive processes by which desire is enacted. The subject's desire to maintain distance from the repressed wish and simultaneously experience it opens up a type of third person syntax allowing for multiple entry into the fantasy. Therefore, in fantasy, vision is multiplied—it becomes possible to see from more than one position at the same time, to see oneself and to see oneself seeing oneself, to divide vision and dislocate subjectivity. This radical omission of the "I" position creates space for all those processes that depend upon such a center, including not only identification but also the field and organization of vision itself.

For Freud, sexuality is linked from the very beginning to an object of fantasy. However, "the object to be rediscovered is not the lost object, but its substitute by displacement; the lost object is the object of self-preservation, of hunger, and the object one seeks to re-find in sexuality is an object displaced in relation to that first object." This initial scene of fantasy is created out of the frustrated infants' deflection away from the instinctual need for milk and nourishment towards a phantasmization of the mother's breast, which is in close proximity to the instinctual need. Now bodily pleasure is derived from the sucking of the mother's breast itself. The mouth that was the original source of nourishment is now the mouth that takes pleasure in its own sucking. This substitution of the breast for milk and the breast for a phantasmic scene represents a further level of mediation which is increasingly psychic. The child cannot experience the pleasure of milk without the psychic re-inscription of the scene in the mind. "The finding of an object is in fact a re-finding of it." It is in the movement and constant restaging away from the instinct that desire is constituted and mobilized.

=== Relation to daydreams ===
A similarly positive view of fantasy was taken by Sigmund Freud who considered fantasy (German: Fantasie) a defence mechanism. He considered that men and women "cannot subsist on the scanty satisfaction which they can extort from reality. 'We simply cannot do without auxiliary constructions,' as Theodor Fontane once said ... [without] dwelling on imaginary wish fulfillments." As childhood adaptation to the reality principle developed, so too "one species of thought activity was split off; it was kept free from reality-testing and remained subordinated to the pleasure principle alone. This activity is fantasying ... continued as day-dreaming." He compared such fantasising to the way a "nature reserve preserves its original state [in] which ... [e]verything ... including what is useless and even what is noxious, can grow and proliferate there as it pleases."

Daydreams for Freud were thus a valuable resource as chronicled in The Psychopathology of Everyday Life. He considered these fantasies to include a great deal of the true constitutional essence of a personality, and that the energetic man "is one who succeeds by his efforts in turning his wishful phantasies into reality," whereas the artist "can transform his phantasies into artistic creations instead of into symptoms ... the doom of neurosis."

== Klein on fantasy ==
Melanie Klein extended Freud's concept of fantasy to cover the developing child's relationship to a world of internal objects. In her thought, this kind of "play activity inside the person is known as 'unconscious phantasy' (deliberately spelled with 'ph' to distinguish it from the word 'fantasy'). And these phantasies are often very violent and aggressive. They are different from ordinary day-dreams or 'fantasies'."

The term "fantasy" became a central issue with the development of the Kleinian group as a distinctive strand within the British Psycho-Analytical Society, and was at the heart of the so-called controversial discussions of the wartime years. "A paper by Susan Isaacs (1952) on 'The nature and function of Phantasy' ... has been generally accepted by the Klein group in London as a fundamental statement of their position." As a defining feature, "Kleinian psychoanalysts regard the unconscious as made up of phantasies of relations with objects. These are thought of as primary and innate, and as the mental representations of instincts ... the psychological equivalents in the mind of defence mechanisms."

Susan Sutherland Isaacs considered that "unconscious phantasies exert a continuous influence throughout life, both in normal and neurotic people, the difference lying in the specific character of the dominant phantasies." Most schools of psychoanalytic thought would now accept that both in analysis and life, we perceive reality through a veil of unconscious phantasy. Isaacs however claimed that "Freud's 'hallucinatory wish-fulfilment' and his 'introjection' and 'projection' are the basis of the fantasy life," and how far unconscious phantasy was a genuine development of Freud's ideas, how far it represented the formation of a new psychoanalytic paradigm, is perhaps the key question of the controversial discussions.

== Lacan on fantasy ==
Lacan engaged from early on with "the imago of the mother" and "the shadow of the bad internal objects" after learning about the work of Melanie Klein on phantasies — with the Imaginary. Increasingly, however, it was Freud's idea of fantasy as a kind of "screen-memory, representing something of more importance with which it was in some way connected." that was for him of greater importance. Lacan came to believe that "the phantasy is never anything more than the screen that conceals something quite primary, something determinate in the function of repetition."

Phantasies thus both link to and block off the individual's unconscious, his kernel or real core: "subject and real are to be situated on either side of the split, in the resistance of the phantasy", which thus comes close to the centre of the individual's personality and its splits and conflicts. "The subject situates himself as determined by the phantasy ... whether in the dream or in any of the more or less well-developed forms of day-dreaming;" and as a rule "a subject's fantasies are close variations on a single theme ... the 'fundamental fantasy' ... minimizing the variations in meaning which might otherwise cause a problem for desire."

The goal of therapy thus became "la traversée du fantasme, the crossing over, traversal, or traversing of the fundamental fantasy." For Lacan, "The traversing of fantasy involves the subject's assumption of a new position with respect to the Other as language and the Other as desire ... a utopian moment beyond neurosis." The question he was left with was "What, then, does he who has passed through the experience ... who has traversed the radical phantasy ... become?."

== The fantasy principle ==
The postmodern emphasis on intersubjectivity in the 21st century has renewed interest in fantasy as an imaginal mode of meaning-making within interpersonal and cultural life. In Jungian psychoanalysis, Michael Vannoy Adams describes this shift through the concept of the fantasy principle, which reframes fantasy not as disguised wish-fulfilment but as a symbolic expression of the psyche’s full emotional range, including affects and archetypal meanings that exceed rational or instrumental interpretation. Here, we are told, "We need to go beyond the pleasure principle, the reality principle, and repetition compulsion to ... the fantasy principle – not, as Freud did, reduce fantasies to wishes ... [but consider] all other imaginable emotions." and thus envisage emotional fantasies as a possible means of moving beyond stereotypes to more nuanced forms of personal and social relating.

Such a perspective "sees emotions as central to developing fantasies about each other that are not determined by collective 'typifications'."

== In mental disorders ==
=== Narcissistic personality disorder ===
Two diagnostic criteria of narcissistic personality disorder are:

- A pervasive pattern of grandiosity (in fantasy or behavior)
- A preoccupation with fantasies of unlimited success, power, brilliance, beauty, or ideal love.

=== Schizophrenia ===
Although vivid mental imagery occurs frequently in those with schizophrenia spectrum disorders, anomalies of imagination are highly characteristic of such individuals; schizophrenic people depict specific patterns of high-neurological activities in their brains' default mode network, which possibly constitute the biomarker of these fantasies.

== See also ==
- Absorption (psychology)
- Autonoetic consciousness
- Creative Writers and Day-Dreaming
- Daydreaming
- Emotion and memory
- Escapism
- Family romance
- Fantasy prone personality
