= Multidimensional Personality Questionnaire =

Personality test

The Multidimensional Personality Questionnaire (MPQ) is a personality test meant to measure normal personality developed by Auke Tellegen in 1982. It is currently sold by the University of Minnesota Press.

The test in its various versions has had 300, 276 and 198 true-false items. The current version is the 276 items one. There also exists a short form with 155 items (MPQ-BF). The questionnaire gives ratings on four broad traits, Positive Emotional Temperament, Negative Emotional Temperament, Constraint and Absorption, as well as 11 primary trait dimensions.

== Broad dimensions ==
=== PEM – Positive Emotional Temperament ===
High Positive Emotional Temperament = behavior and temperamental characteristics conducive to joy, and to active and rewarding engagement with social and work environments. Low Positive Emotional Temperament = tendencies to experience joylessness, loss of interest, and fatigue, reflecting non-pleasurable and possibly depressive disengagement. Associated with Well-being, Social Potency, Achievement, and Social Closeness.

=== NEM – Negative Emotional Temperament ===
High Negative Emotional Temperament = proneness to experience anxiety, anger, and related emotional and behavioral negative engagement. Low Negative Emotional Temperament = a somewhat phlegmatic temperament, disposing to calm, relaxation, and other non-pleasurable states of disengagement. Most distinctively related to Stress Reaction, Alienation, and Aggression.

=== CON – Constraint ===
High Constraint = tendencies to inhibit and restrain impulse expression, unconventional behavior, and risk-taking. Low Constraint = inclined to act on impulse, take risks, and ignore conventional restrictions. Cluster of traits primarily linked to Control, Harm-avoidance, and Traditionalism.

== Primary trait scales ==
=== Well-Being ===
"High scorers on this scale describe themselves as: Having a cheerful happy disposition; feeling good about themselves; seeing a bright future ahead; being optimists; living interesting, exciting lives; enjoying the things they are doing."

=== Social Potency ===
"High scorers on this scale describe themselves as: Being forceful and decisive; persuasive and liking to influence others; enjoying or would enjoy leadership roles; enjoying being noticed, being the center of attention."

=== Achievement ===
"High scorers on this scale describe themselves as: Working hard, driving themselves; enjoying working hard; welcoming difficult and demanding tasks; persisting where others give up; ambitious; putting work and accomplishment before many other things; setting high standards; being perfectionistic."

=== Social Closeness ===
"High scorers on this scale describe themselves as: Sociable, liking to be with people; taking pleasure in and valuing close personal ties; warm and affectionate; turning to others for comfort and help."

=== Stress Reaction ===
"High scorers on this scale describe themselves as: Tense and nervous; sensitive and vulnerable; prone to worry and feeling anxious; irritable and easily upset; having changing moods; feeling miserable without reason; being troubled by feelings of guilt and unworthiness."

=== Alienation ===
"High scorers on this scale describe themselves as: Believing that others wish them harm; being victims of false and nasty rumors; having been betrayed and deceived; feeling used by "friends"; feeling pushed around; having had a lot of bad luck."

=== Aggression ===
"High scorers on this scale describe themselves as: Physically aggressive; enjoying upsetting and frightening others; enjoying scenes of violence (fights, violent movies); victimizing others for own advantage."

=== Control vs. Impulsivity ===
"High scorers on this scale describe themselves as: Reflective; cautious, careful, plodding; rational, sensible, level-headed; liking to plan activities in detail."

=== Harm Avoidance vs. Danger Seeking ===
"High scorers on this scale describe themselves as: Not enjoying or would not enjoy participating in dangerous adventures or activities (e.g., skydiving), being in a natural disaster (e.g., a forest fire), being caught in a sudden and dangerous emergency (e.g., a hold-up); deliberately risking serious bodily injury (e.g., riding a runaway horse). Instead, prefer safer activities and experiences, even if they are tedious or aggravating."

=== Traditionalism ===
"High scorers on this scale describe themselves as: Endorsing high moral standards, religious values, and institutions; expressing positive regard for parents; endorsing strict child-rearing practices; valuing conventional propriety and a good reputation; opposing rebelliousness and unrestricted freedom of expression; condemning selfish disregard of others."

=== Absorption ===
"High scorers on this scale describe themselves as: Responsive to evocative sights and sounds (e.g., a sunset); readily captured by entrancing stimuli (e.g., overpowering music); tending to think in images; have "crossmodal" experiences, including synesthesia (e.g., sounds evoke color experiences); capable of vivid and compelling imaginings; able to vividly re-experience the past; becoming deeply immersed in own thoughts and imaginings; experiencing episodes of expanded (e.g., ESP-like) awareness; experiencing states of altered awareness (e.g., of "stepping outside oneself")."
