= Fantasy-prone personality =

Disposition toward strong fantasies

Fantasy-prone personality (FPP) is a disposition or personality trait in which a person experiences a lifelong, extensive, and deep involvement in fantasy. This disposition is an attempt, at least in part, to better describe "overactive imagination" or "living in a dream world". An individual with this trait (termed a fantasizer) may have difficulty differentiating between fantasy and reality and may experience hallucinations, as well as self-suggested psychosomatic symptoms. Closely related psychological constructs include daydreaming, absorption, limerence and eidetic memory.

== History ==
American psychologists Sheryl C. Wilson and Theodore X. Barber first identified FPP in 1981, said to apply to about 4% of the population. Besides identifying this trait, Wilson and Barber reported a number of childhood antecedents that likely laid the foundation for fantasy proneness in later life, such as, "a parent, grandparent, teacher, or friend who encouraged the reading of fairy tales, reinforced the child's ... fantasies, and treated the child's dolls and stuffed animals in ways that encouraged the child to believe that they were alive." They suggested that this trait was almost synonymous with those who responded dramatically to hypnotic induction, that is, "high hypnotizables".

The first systematic studies were conducted in the 1980s by psychologists Judith Rhue and Steven Jay Lynn. Later research in the 1990s by Deirdre Barrett at Harvard confirmed most of these characteristics of fantasy prone people, but she also identified another set of highly hypnotizable subjects who had had traumatic childhoods and who identified fantasy time mainly by "spacing out".

== Characteristic features ==
Fantasy prone persons are reported to spend a large portion of their time awake fantasizing or daydreaming. People with Type 1 FPP will often confuse or mix their fantasies with their real memories. They also report out-of-body experiences, and other similar experiences that are interpreted by some fantasizers as psychic (parapsychological) or mystical. However, those with Type 2 have perfect ability to distinguish between reality and fantasy.

A paracosm is an extremely detailed and structured fantasy world often created by extreme or compulsive fantasizers.

Wilson and Barber listed numerous characteristics in their pioneer study, which have been clarified and amplified in later studies. These characteristics include some or many of the following experiences:

- Excellent hypnotic subject (most but not all fantasizers)
- Having imaginary friends in childhood
- Fantasizing often as child
- Having an actual fantasy identity
- Experiencing imagined sensations as real
- Having vivid sensory perceptions
- Receiving sexual satisfaction without physical stimulation

Fantasy proneness is measured by the "Inventory of Childhood Memories and Imaginings" (ICMI) and the "Creative Experiences Questionnaire (CEQ).

== Developmental pathways ==
Fantasizers have had a large exposure to fantasy during early childhood. This over-exposure to childhood fantasy has at least three important causes:

- Parents or caregivers who indulged in their child's imaginative mental or play environment during childhood.
- Exposure to abuse, physical or sexual, such that fantasizing provides a coping or escape mechanism.
- Exposure to severe loneliness and isolation, such that fantasizing provides a coping or escape mechanism from the boredom.

People with fantasy prone personalities are more likely to have had parents, or close family members that joined the child in believing toys are living creatures. They may also have encouraged the child who believed they had imaginary companions, read fairytales all through childhood and re-enacted the things they had read. People who, at a young age, were involved in creative fantasy activities like piano, ballet, and drawing are more likely to obtain a fantasy prone personality. Acting is also a way for children to identify as different people and characters which can make the child prone to fantasy-like dreams as they grow up. This can cause the person to grow up thinking they have experienced certain things and they can visualize a certain occurrence from the training they obtained while being involved in plays.

People have reported that they believed their dolls and stuffed animals were living creatures and that their parents encouraged them to indulge in their fantasies and daydreams. For example, one subject in Barrett's study said her parents' standard response to her requests for expensive toys was, "You could take this (household object) and with a little imagination, it would look just like (an expensive gift)."

Regarding psychoanalytic interpretations, Sigmund Freud stated that "unsatisfied wishes are the driving power behind fantasies, every separate fantasy contains the fulfillment of a wish, and improves an unsatisfactory reality." This shows childhood abuse and loneliness can result in people creating a fantasy world of happiness in order to fill the void.

== Related constructs ==
Openness to experience is one of the five domains that are used to describe human personality in the Five Factor Model. Openness involves six facets, or dimensions, including active imagination (fantasy), aesthetic sensitivity, attentiveness to inner feelings, preference for variety, and intellectual curiosity. Thus, fantasy prone personality correlates with the fantasy facet of the broader personality trait Openness to Experience.

Absorption is a disposition or personality trait in which a person becomes absorbed in their mental imagery, particularly fantasy. The original research on absorption was by American psychologist Auke Tellegen. Roche reports that fantasy proneness and absorption are highly correlated. Fantasizers become absorbed within their vivid and realistic mental imagery.

Dissociation is a psychological process involving, among other things, alterations in personal identity or sense of self. These alterations can include: a sense that one's self or the world is unreal (depersonalization and derealization); a loss of memory (amnesia); forgetting one's identity or assuming a new self (fugue); and fragmentation of identity or self into separate streams of consciousness (dissociative identity disorder, formerly termed multiple personality disorder). Dissociation is measured most often by the Dissociative Experiences Scale. Several studies have reported that dissociation and fantasy proneness are highly correlated. This suggests the possibility that the dissociated selves are merely fantasies, for example, being a coping response to trauma. However, a lengthy review of the evidence concludes that there is strong empirical support for the hypothesis that dissociation is caused primarily and directly by exposure to trauma, and that fantasy is of secondary importance.

== Health implications ==
Many female fantasizers—60% of the women asked in the Wilson-Barber study—reported that they have had a false pregnancy (pseudocyesis) at least once. They believed that they were pregnant, and they had many of the symptoms. In addition to amenorrhea (stoppage of menstruation), they typically experienced at least four of the following: breast changes, abdominal enlargement, morning sickness, cravings, and perceived fetal movements. Two of the subjects went for abortions, following which they were told that no fetus had been found. All of the other false pregnancies terminated quickly when negative results were received from pregnancy tests.

Maladaptive daydreaming is a proposed psychological disorder, a fantasy activity that replaces human interaction and interferes with work, relationships and general activities. Those with this pathology daydream or fantasize excessively, assuming roles and characters in scenarios created to their liking. People with excessive daydreaming are aware that the scenarios and characters of their fantasies are not real and have the ability to determine what is real, elements that differentiate them from those with schizophrenia.

== See also ==
- Autonoetic consciousness – Human ability for introspection
- Hyperphantasia – Condition of having extremely vivid mental imagery
- Hyperthymesia – High-detailed autobiographical memory
- Maladaptive daydreaming – Trait associated with some mental disorders
- Suggestibility – Inclination to accept the suggestions of others
- "The Secret Life of Walter Mitty" – 1939 short story by James Thurber
