= David Marks (psychologist) =

British psychologist

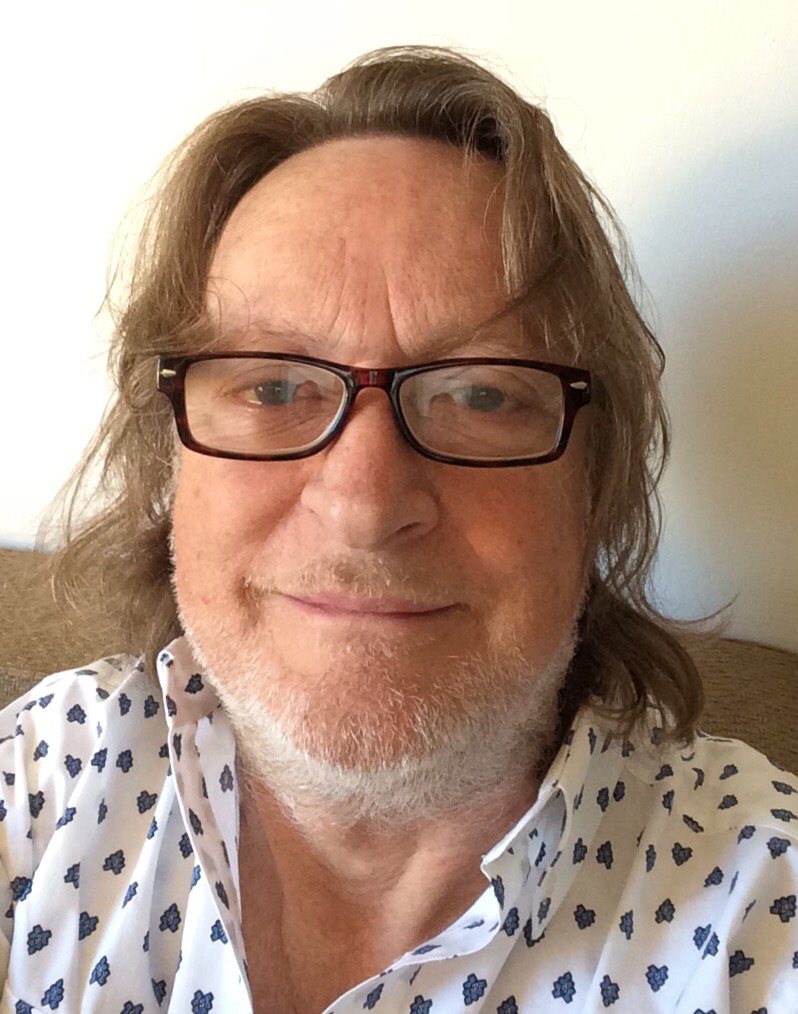
- David F. Marks, 2015
- Born: David Francis Marks; 12 February 1945 (age 81); Liphook, Hampshire, England
- Education: University of Reading (BSc); University of Sheffield (PhD)
- Occupations: Psychologist, author, editor
- Known for: Vividness of Visual Imagery Questionnaire
- Children: 2
- Scientific career
- Thesis: An Investigation of Subjective Probability Judgements (1969)
- Doctoral advisor: Jack K Clarkson
- Doctoral students: Sally Casswell
- Website: davidfmarks.net

David Francis Marks (born 12 February 1945) is a British psychologist, known for his creation of the Vividness of Visual Imagery Questionnaire.

== Biography ==
Marks was born on 12 February 1945 in Liphook, Hampshire, England, to Victor W.F. Marks and Mary Dorothy (née Goodman) Marks.

Marks earned a BSc at University of Reading in 1966 and a PhD at University of Sheffield in 1970. From there, he moved to New Zealand, where he taught at the University of Otago as a lecturer and then senior lecturer in psychology. He returned to the UK as Head of the School of Psychology at Middlesex University before working at City University London from 2000 to 2010. He founded the Journal of Health Psychology and Health Psychology Open, an open-access journal.

His brother Jon Marks was a jazz musician. David Marks retired from his university post in 2010 and lives in Arles, Provence-Alpes-Côte d'Azur, France.

== Memberships ==
- Committee for Skeptical Inquiry (Fellow)

== Vividness of Visual Imagery Questionnaire ==
Marks developed the widely-used Vividness of Visual Imagery Questionnaire, a tool for the assessment of individual differences in visual imagery.
