= Vividness of Visual Imagery Questionnaire =

Psychometric instrument for visual imagery vividness

The Vividness of Visual Imagery Questionnaire (VVIQ) was developed in 1973 by the British psychologist David Marks. The VVIQ is a self-reported survey consisting of 16 items in four groups of four. For each question, the participant is invited to consider the mental image formed when thinking about specific scenes and situations, carried out with eyes closed and/or with eyes open, and compare the image to visual perception. The vividness of each image is rated along a 5-point scale, producing a score between 16 and 80, with higher scores corresponding to less vivid visual mental imagery.

The questionnaire has been widely used as a measure of individual differences in vividness of visual imagery, appearing in studies of mental imagery in a variety of fields including cognitive psychology, clinical psychology, and neuropsychology. VVIQ scores are commonly reversed from the original 1973 publication, such that lower scores correspond to less vivid mental imagery.

In 1995, Marks published an updated version called the VVIQ2. This questionnaire consists of twice the number of items. It also reverses the rating scale so that lower scores reflect lower vividness, matching the consensus-established preference of researchers.

The VVIQ has spawned imagery vividness questionnaires across several other modalities including auditory, movement, olfactory, wine imagery, and haptic movement.

== Validation ==
Some critics have argued that introspective or self-report questionnaires including the VVIQ are “too subjective” and can fall under the influence of social desirability, demand characteristics, or other uncontrolled factors. Some evidence of criterion validity for the VVIQ was found in a 1995 meta-analysis by McKelvie, which indicated that internal consistency was acceptable and test-retest reliability was minimally acceptable. McKelvie reported only a weak correlation (r =.137) between VVIQ imagery ability and memory performance. McKelvie asserted that his “findings support the construct of vividness and the validity of the VVIQ” (p. 59) while also suggesting modifications to the VVIQ, writing that "the situation might improve if certain features of the test were altered" (p. 1).

Imagery vividness is not equivalent to imagery accuracy, and results are mixed concerning the relationship between VVIQ scores and performance on tasks (e.g., memory tasks). On one hand, Rodway et al. used a novel long-term change detection task to determine whether participants with low and high vividness scores on the VVIQ2 showed performance differences. They found that high vividness participants were significantly more accurate at detecting salient changes to pictures compared to low vividness participants. This replicated an earlier study by Gur and Hilgard. However, Reisberg & Leak found that participants with vivid mental imagery had inferior accuracy for remembered faces when compared to people with less vivid mental imagery. Overall, the literature is full of mixed and equivocal findings about the value of the VVIQ for predicting performance on tasks.

Campos and Pérez-Fabello evaluated the reliability and construct validity of the VVIQ and the VVIQ2. Cronbach's $\alpha$ reliabilities for both the VVIQ and the VVIQ-2 were found to be high. Estimates of internal consistency, reliability, and construct validity were found to be similar for the two versions.

The VVIQ is in several languages apart from English including Spanish, Japanese, French, and Polish. Factor analysis of the Spanish VVIQ indicated a single factor that explained 37% of the variance with good internal consistency (Cronbach α = 88).

A meta-analysis of gender differences in 16 comparisons of men and women’s VVIQ scores showed a “slight but reliable tendency for women to report more vivid images than men”. However, Richardson observed that randomizing the order of the items "abolishes the effects of gender" [as a confound], suggesting that the gender differences themselves are determined by psychosocial factors rather than by biological ones.

An updated meta-analysis of the validity of the VVIQ by Runge et al. compared two main formats used to measure imagery vividness: trial-by-trial vividness ratings (VRs) and the Vividness of Visual Imagery Questionnaire (VVIQ). Associations were computed between the vividness scores obtained using these two formats and behavioural, cognitive, and neuroscientific measures. Significantly larger effect sizes were found for VRs than for VVIQ, which suggest that VRs provide a more reliable self-report measure than the VVIQ, and “may reflect a more direct route of reportability than the latter”.

== Neuropsychological studies ==
Amedi et al. predicted that VVIQ scores might be correlated with the degree of deactivation of the auditory cortex in individual subjects in functional magnetic resonance imaging (fMRI). These investigators found a significant correlation between the magnitude of A1 deactivation (negative blood-oxygen-level-dependent -BOLD- signal in auditory cortex) and the subjective vividness of visual imagery (Spearman r = 0.73, p < 0.05). Similarly, a study by Cui et al. observed that reported vividness is correlated with an objective fMRI measure of brain activity: the early visual cortex activity relative to the whole brain activity. These results suggest that individual differences in visual imagery vividness may be quantifiable even in the absence of subjective self-reported scales such as the VVIQ.
