= Outline of painting =

Practice of applying paint, pigment, color or other medium to a surface

The following outline is provided as an overview of and topical guide to painting:

Painting is a visual art, characterized by the practice of applying paint, pigment, color, or other medium to a solid surface. The medium is commonly applied to the base with a brush. Other implements, such as palette knives, sponges, airbrushes, the artist's fingers, or even a dripping technique that uses gravity may be used. One who produces paintings is called a painter.

A painting is the product of that activity.

== What type of thing is painting? ==
Painting can be described as all of the following:

- Art – aesthetic expression for presentation or performance, and the work produced from this activity. The word "art" is therefore both a verb and a noun, as is the word "painting".
  - Work of art – aesthetic physical item or artistic creation. A painting is a work of art expressed in paint.
  - One of the arts – as an art form, painting is an outlet of human expression, that is usually influenced by culture and which in turn helps to change culture. Painting is a physical manifestation of the internal human creative impulse.
    - Fine art – in Western European academic traditions, fine art is art developed primarily for aesthetics, distinguishing it from applied art that also has to serve some practical function. The word "fine" here does not so much denote the quality of the artwork in question, but the purity of the discipline according to traditional Western European canons.
    - One of the visual arts – visual arts is a class of art forms, including painting, sculpture, photography, printmaking and others, that focus on the creation of works which are primarily visual in nature.

== Essence of painting ==
- Artistic inspiration
  - Muse
  - Afflatus
- Creativity
- Imagination

== Styles of painting ==
=== Styles of painting by movement ===
- Abstract expressionism – movement in painting, originating in New York City in the 1940s. It emphasized spontaneous personal expression, freedom from accepted artistic values, surface qualities of paint, and the act of painting itself. Pollock, de Kooning, Motherwell, and Kline, are important abstract expressionists.
- Academic art – a style of painting and sculpture produced under the influence of European academies or universities. Specifically, academic art is the art and artists influenced by the standards of the French Académie des beaux-arts, which practiced under the movements of Neoclassicism and Romanticism, and the art that followed these two movements in the attempt to synthesize both of their styles.
- Action painting – connected to the Abstract Expressionist movement, but more precise in its meaning, Action Painting believes in the expressive power held in the actual act of painting as much as in the finished product. Rosenberg defined the notion of the canvas as seen by the artists in this movement as being 'not a picture but an event'.
- Art Deco – design style prevalent during the 1920s and 1930s, characterized by a sleek use of straight lines and slender form.
- Art Nouveau – decorative art movement that emerged in the late nineteenth century. Characterized by dense asymmetrical ornamentation in sinuous forms, it is often symbolic and of an erotic nature. Klimt worked in an art nouveau style.
- Baroque – movement in European painting in the seventeenth and early eighteenth centuries, characterized by violent movement, strong emotion, and dramatic lighting and coloring. Bernini, Caravaggio and Rubens were among important baroque artists.
- Bauhaus – school of art, design and architecture founded in Germany in 1919. Bauhaus style is characterized by its severely economic, geometric design and by its respect for materials. The Bauhaus school was created by Walter Gropius.
- Byzantine – style of the Byzantine Empire and its provinces, c. 330–1450. Appearing mostly in religious mosaics, manuscript illuminations, and panel paintings, it is characterized by rigid, monumental, stylized forms with gold backgrounds.
- Classicism – based on Greek and Roman art of antiquity with emphasis on harmony, proportion, balance, and simplicity.
- Color field painting – technique in abstract painting developed in the 1950s. It focuses on the lyrical effects of large areas of color, often poured or stained onto the canvas. Newman, Rothko, and Frankenthaler painted in this manner.
- Conceptual art – movement of the 1960s and 1970s that emphasized the artistic idea over the art object. It attempted to free art from the confines of the gallery and the pedestal.
- Constructivism – Russian abstract movement founded by Tatlin, Gabo, and Antoine Pevsner, c. 1915. It focused on art for the industrial age. Tatlin believed in art with a utilitarian purpose.
- Cubism – revolutionary movement begun by Picasso and Braque in the early twentieth century. It employs an analytic vision based on fragmentation and multiple viewpoints.
- Empire style – sometimes considered the second phase of Neoclassicism, is an early 19th century design movement in architecture, furniture, other decorative arts, and the visual arts.
- Dadaism – movement, c. 1915–1923, that rejected accepted aesthetic standards. It aimed to create antiart and nonart, often employing a sense of the absurd.
- Der Blaue Reiter – name derived from a drawing by Wassily Kandinsky that appeared on the cover of the Almanac featuring a blue horseman. Established in December 1911 by Kandinsky, Marc and Gabriele Münter their first show was entitled 'First Exhibition by the editorial board of the Blue Rider' and was launched to coincide with the last show by the NKV in the same gallery in Munich.
- Die Neue Sachlichkeit (The New Objectivity) – Expressionist movement founded in Germany in the aftermath of World War I by George Grosz and Otto Dix. Its artwork is characterized by a realistic style combined with a cynical and socially critical philosophical stance. Other artists associated with the movement included Christian Schad and Max Beckmann.
- The Eight – group of American painters who united out of opposition to academic standards in the early twentieth century. Members of the group were Robert Henri, Arthur Davies, Maurice Prendergast, William James Glackens, Ernest Lawson, Everett Shinn, John Sloan, and George Luks.
- Expressionism – art that uses emphasis and distortion to communicate emotion. More specifically, it refers to early twentieth century northern European art, especially in Germany c. 1905–1925. Artists such as Rouault, Kokoschka, and Schiele painted in this manner.
- Fauvism – style adopted by artists associated with Matisse, c. 1905–1908. They painted in a spontaneous manner, using bold colors. From the French word fauve, meaning "wild beast".
- Flemish School – characterised by idealism and experimentation with perspective, Flemish art thrived in the 15th century with artists such as Jan van Eyck, Rogier van der Weyden, Hans Memling and Dirk Bouts. They specialised in portrait painting with religious themes and complicated iconography.
- Fluxus – movement that encompassed a new aesthetic, a reductive gesturality, part Dada, part Bauhaus and part Zen, and presumes that all media and all artistic disciplines are fair game for combination and fusion. Fluxus presaged avant-garde developments over the last 40 years. Fluxus objects and performances are characterized by minimalist but often expansive gestures based in scientific, philosophical, sociological, or other extra-artistic ideas and leavened with burlesque.
- Folk art – works of a culturally homogeneous people without formal training, generally according to regional traditions and involving crafts.
- Futurism – Italian movement c. 1909–1919. It attempted to integrate the dynamism of the machine age into art. Boccioni was a futurist artist.
- Gothic – European movement beginning in France. Gothic sculpture emerged c. 1200, Gothic painting later in the thirteenth century. Gothic art has a linear, graceful, elegant style more naturalistic than that which had existed previously in Europe.
- Graffiti Art – movement which was very successful in New York in the 1980s. It was named after the spray-can vandalism common in most cities and most associated with the New York City Subway system. The two most successful figures of this movement were Jean-Michel Basquiat and Keith Haring. The New York art scene embraced Graffiti Art, with several galleries specialising in the genre and a Museum of American Graffiti opening in 1989.
- Group of Seven – began in the early 1900s when several Canadian Artists began noticing a similarity in style. Canadian Painters Tom Thomson, J.E.H. MacDonald, Arthur Lismer, Frederick Varley, Frank Johnston and Franklin Carmichael were often believed to have socialised together through common interests and mutual employment.
- Harlem Renaissance – from 1920 until about 1930 African-American cultural movement became known as "The New Negro Movement" and later as the Harlem Renaissance. More than a literary movement and more than a social revolt against racism, the Harlem Renaissance exalted the unique culture of African-Americans and redefined African-American expression.
- Impressionism – late-nineteenth-century French school of painting. It focused on transitory visual impressions, often painted directly from nature, with an emphasis on the changing effects of light and color. Monet, Renoir, and Pissarro were important impressionists.
- Kitsch – German and Yiddish word denoting art that is considered an inferior, tasteless copy of an extant style of art.
- Lyrical Abstraction – Post-War style of abstract painting emanating out of Europe in the late 1940s and a style of American painting emanating out of New York City and Los Angeles in the mid-1960s. Related to Abstract Expressionism and Color Field painting. Practitioners include Pierre Soulages, Nicolas de Staël, Georges Mathieu and many others.
- Mannerism – style, c. 1520–1600, that arose in reaction to the harmony and proportion of the High Renaissance. It featured elongated, contorted poses, crowded canvases, and harsh lighting and coloring.
- Massurrealism – fusion of the dream like visions of surrealism, pop art and New Media Technology - as well as for an expression of the Hyper-real.
- Minimalism – movement in American painting and sculpture that originated in the late 1950s. It emphasized pure, reduced forms and strict, systematic compositions.
- Les Nabis – group of French painters active in the 1890s who worked in a subjective, sometimes mystical style, stressing flat areas of color and pattern. Bonnard and Vuillard were members. From the Hebrew word for "prophet."
- Naive Art – artwork, usually paintings, characterized by a simplified style, nonscientific perspective, and bold colors. The artists are generally not professionally trained. Henri Rousseau and Grandma Moses worked in this style.
- Neoclassicism or Neo-Classicism – European style of the late eighteenth and early nineteenth centuries that drew inspiration from the "classical" art and culture of Ancient Greece or Ancient Rome. Its elegant, balanced works revived the order and harmony of ancient Greek and Roman art. David and Canova are examples of neoclassicists.
- Op Art – abstract movement in Europe and the United States, begun in the mid-1950s, based on the effects of optical patterns. Albers worked in this style.
- Photorealism – figurative movement that emerged in the United States and Britain in the late 1960s and 1970s. The subject matter, usually everyday scenes, is portrayed in an extremely detailed, exacting style. It is also called superrealism, especially when referring to sculpture.
- Pointillism – method of painting developed by Seurat and Paul Signac in the 1880s. It used dabs of pure color that were intended to mix in the eyes of viewers rather than on the canvas. It is also called divisionism or neoimpressionism.
- Pop Art – movement that began in Britain and the United States in the 1950s. It used the images and techniques of mass media, advertising, and popular culture, often in an ironic way. Works of Warhol, Lichtenstein, and Oldenburg exemplify this style.
- Postimpressionism – term coined by British art critic Roger Fry to refer to a group of nineteenth-century painters, including Cézanne, Van Gogh, and Gauguin, who were dissatisfied with the limitations of expressionism. It has since been used to refer to various reactions against impressionism, such as fauvism and expressionism.
- Pre-Raphaelite Brotherhood – group of English painters formed in 1848. These artists attempted to recapture the style of painting preceding Raphael. They rejected industrialized England and focused on painting from nature, producing detailed, colorful works. Rossetti was a founding member.
- Realist movement – nineteenth century movement, especially in France, that rejected idealized academic styles in favor of everyday subjects. Daumier, Millet, and Courbet were realists. In a general sense, refers to objective representation.
- Renaissance – Refers to Europe c. 1400–1600. Renaissance art which began in Italy, stressed the forms of classical antiquity, a realistic representation of space based on scientific perspective, and secular subjects. The works of Leonardo, Michelangelo, and Raphael exemplify the balance and harmony of the High Renaissance (c. 1495–1520). Means "rebirth" in French.
- Rococo – eighteenth-century European style, originating in France. In reaction to the grandeur and massiveness of the baroque, rococo employed refined, elegant, highly decorative forms. Fragonard worked in this style.
- Romanesque – European style developed in France in the late eleventh century. Its sculpture is ornamental, stylized and complex. Some Romanesque frescoes survive, painted in a monumental, active manner.
- Romanticism – European movement of the late eighteenth to mid nineteenth century. In reaction to neoclassicism, it focused on emotion over reason, and on spontaneous expression. The subject matter was invested with drama and usually painted energetically in brilliant colors. Delacroix, Géricault, Turner, and Blake were Romantic artists.
- Situationism – influenced by Dada, Surrealism and Lettrism. The post-war Lettrist International, which sought to fuse poetry and music and transform the urban landscape, was a direct forerunner of the group who founded the magazine 'Situationiste Internationale' in 1957. At first, they were principally concerned with the "suppression of art", that is to say, they wished like the Dadaists and the Surrealists before them to supersede the categorization of art and culture as separate activities and to transform them into part of everyday life.
- De Stijl – art movement advocating pure abstraction and simplicity—form reduced to the rectangle and other geometric shapes, and colour to the primary colours, along with black and white. Piet Mondrian was the group's leading figure. He published a manifesto titled Neo-Plasticism in 1920. Another member, painter Theo van Doesburg had started a journal named De Stijl, spreading the theories of the group. Their work exerted tremendous influence on the Bauhaus and the International Style.
- Suprematism – Russian abstract movement originated by Malevich c. 1913. It was characterized by flat geometric shapes on plain backgrounds and emphasized the spiritual qualities of pure form.
- Surrealism – movement of the 1920s and 1930s that began in France. It explored the unconscious, often using images from dreams. It used spontaneous techniques and featured unexpected juxtapositions of objects. Magritte, Dalí, Miró, and Ernst painted surrealist works.
- Symbolism – painting movement that flourished in France in the 1880s and 1890s in which subject matter was suggested rather than directly presented. It featured decorative, stylized, and evocative images.
- Abstract art –
- Abstract grid art –
- Art Brut –
- Abstract Illusionism –
- Academic Gride art –
- Aestheticism –
- Altermodern –
- American Barbizon school –
- American Impressionism –
- American realism –
- American Scene Painting –
- Analytical art –
- Antipodeans –
- Anti-realism –
- Arabesque –
- Arbeitsrat für Kunst –
- Art Informel –
- Art Photography –
- Arte Povera –
- Arts and Crafts Movement –
- Ashcan School –
- Assemblage –
- Les Automatistes –
- Barbizon school –
- Bauhaus –
- Chiaroscuro –
- Chicago Imagists
- Classical Realism –
- Cubism –
- Dada –
- Danube school –
- Dau-al-Set –
- De Stijl also known as Neoplasticism –
- Die Brücke –
- Deconstructivism –
- Energy Art movement –
- Fantastic realism –
- Figurative art –
  - Marine art
- Figuration Libre –
- Geometric abstract art –
- Graphic grid art –
- Graphic grid in visual art –
- Graphic grid in applied art –
- Graphic grid in painting –
- Gutai group –
- Hudson River School –
- Humanistic Aestheticism –
- Hypermodernism –
- Hyperrealism –
- Institutional Critique –
- International Gothic –
- International Typographic Style –
- indian Style –
- Les Nabis –
- Letterism –
- Lowbrow (art movement) –
- Lyco art –
- Lyrical Abstraction –
- Magic Realism –
- Maximalism –
- Metaphysical painting –
- Mingei –
- Modern art –
- Modernism –
- Modular constructivism –
- Narrative art –
- Neoclassicism –
- Neo-Dada –
- Neo-expressionism –
- Neo-figurative –
- Neoism –
- Neo-primitivism –
- Net art –
- New Objectivity –
- Northwest School (art) –
- Orphism –
- Pixel Art –
- Pixel Grid Art –
- Plein Air –
- Postmodernism –
- Precisionism –
- Pre-Raphaelitism –
- Primitivism –
- Purism (arts) –
  - Purism in painting
- Qajar art –
- Rasquache –
- Realism –
- Remodernism –
- Rococo –
- Salon –
- Samikshavad –
- Sfumato –
- Shin hanga –
- Shock art –
- Sōsaku hanga –
- Socialist Realism –
- Space Art –
- Street Art –
- Still life –
- Stuckism –
- Synchromism –
- Tachisme –
- Toyism –
- Transgressive art –
- Ukiyo-e –
- Underground comix –
- Veduta –
- Vorticism –
- Verdadism –
- Visionary art –

=== Styles of painting by region ===
- Eastern painting
  - East Asian painting
    - Chinese painting
    - Japanese painting
  - South Asian painting
    - Indian painting
    - Indian Grid Tantr painting
- Painting in the Americas
- American art
  - Native American art
  - Maya art
  - Pre-Columbian art
  - Plains hide painting
  - Painting in the Americas before Colonization
- African art
  - Akan art
  - Benin art
  - Botswanan art
  - Egyptian art
  - Somali art
  - South African art
- Albanian art
- Algerian art
- Andorran art
- Angolan art
- Argentine art
- Armenian art
- Bahamian art
- Basque art
- Belarusian art
- Belgian art
- Bhutanese art
- Bolivian art
- Bosnia and Herzegovina art
- Brazilian art
- British art
- Burmese art
- Cambodian art
- Canadian art
- Caribbean art
- Chilean art
- Chinese art
- Colombian art
- Costa Rican art
- Croatian art
- Cuban art
- Cypriot art
- Czech art
- Danish art
- Dominican Republic art
- Dutch art
- Ecuadorian art
- Egyptian art
- Estonian art
- Ethiopian art
- Finnish art
- French art
- Gambian art
- Georgian art
- German art
- Greek art
- Grenadian art
- Haitian art
- Hawaiian art
- Hungarian art
- Icelandic art
- Indian art
- Indonesian art
- Iranian art
- Iraqi art
- Irish art
- Israeli art
- Italian art
- Ivorian art
- Jamaican art
- Japanese art
- Jordanian art
- Kazakhstani art
- Korean art
- Laotian art
- Latvian art
- Lebanese art
- Libyan art
- Liechtenstein art
- Lithuanian art
- Luxembourgian art
- Macedonian art
- Malaysian art
- Mexican art
- Moldovan art
- Montenegrin art
- Miniature art
- Miniature Indian art
- Miniature Iran art
- Miniature mugal art
- Miniature kishan gad art
- Miniature Kota art
- Miniature Rajasthani art
- Miniature Marvad art
- Mural art
- Moroccan art
- Nepalese art
- Nicaraguan art
- Niuean art
- Norwegian art
- Palestinian arts
- Panamanian art
- Paraguayan art
- Peruvian art
- Polish art
- Portuguese art
- Puerto Rican art
- Romanian art
- Russian art
- Saudi Arabian art
- Scottish art
- Senegalese art
- Serbian art
- Slovak art
- Slovenian art
- Sathya art
- Soviet art
- Spanish art
- Swedish art
- Swiss art
- Tahitian art
- Taiwanese art
- Thai art (3 C, 20 P)
- Trinidad and Tobago art
- Tunisian art
- Turkish art
- Turkish Cypriot art
- Ukrainian art
- United Arab Emirati art
- Uruguayan art
- Uzbekistani art
- Venezuelan art
- Vietnamese art
- Welsh art
- Zimbabwean art

== History of painting ==
- Prehistoric art
- Ancient art history
- Western art history
- Eastern art history
- Islamic art history
- Art periods
- History of art

== General concepts ==
=== Materials ===
- Acrylic paint –
- Aquarelle –
- Canvas –
- Crayon –
- Drawing –
- Drying oil –
- Egg tempera –
- Encaustic –
- Fresco –
- Frottage –
- Gesso –
- Glair –
- Glaze –
- Gouache –
- Ground –
- Ink –
- Mastic –
- Mineral spirits –
- Oil painting –
- Paint –
- Pigment –
- Pastel –
- Pencil crayon –
- Solvent –
- Tempera –
- Turpentine –
- Varnish –
- Wash –
- Watercolor painting –

=== Tools ===
- Airbrush –
- Brush –
- Easel –
- Maulstick –
- Model –
- Palette –
- Palette knife –

=== Elements ===
- Atmospheric perspective –
- Color –
- Body –
- Hue –
- Tint –
- Tone –
- Value –
- Line –
- Imagery –
- Impasto –
- Imprimatura –
- Painterly –
- Perspective –
- Plasticity –
- Shading –
- Sketch –
- Spatial organization –
- Surface –
- Texture –
- Underpainting –

=== Learning and study ===
- Academy –
- Art criticism (Appreciation) –
- Color theory –
- Hierarchy of genres –
- Preservation –
- Saponification –
- Painter –

=== Signatures and inscriptions ===
- Fecit –
- Pinxit –

== Artists ==
- Giotto di Bondone –
- Jan van Eyck –
- Leonardo da Vinci –
- Raphael –
- Sandro Botticelli –
- Titian –
- Peter Paul Rubens –
- Diego Velázquez –
- El Greco –
- Caravaggio –
- Rembrandt –
- Johannes Vermeer –
- Francisco Goya –
- Édouard Manet –
- Edgar Degas –
- Claude Monet –
- Pierre-Auguste Renoir –
- Paul Cézanne –
- Vincent van Gogh –
- Wassily Kandinsky –
- Henri Matisse –
- Pablo Picasso –
- Piet Mondrian –
- Jackson Pollock –
- Willem de Kooning –
- Andy Warhol –

== Famous paintings ==
- List of most expensive paintings
- List of paintings on Soviet postage stamps
- List of artworks on stamps of the United States
- 100 Great Paintings, a 1980 BBC television series
- Sistine Chapel ceiling

=== By painter ===
- List of paintings by Leonardo da Vinci
- List of paintings by Michelangelo
- List of paintings by Vincent van Gogh
- List of paintings by Claude Monet
- List of paintings by Paul Cézanne
- List of paintings by Ford Madox Brown
- List of paintings by Paul Gauguin
- List of paintings by Frans Hals
- List of paintings by Frida Kahlo
- List of paintings by Georges Emile Lebacq
- List of paintings by Edvard Munch
- List of paintings by Rembrandt
- List of paintings by Johannes Vermeer
- List of paintings by John William Waterhouse
- List of paintings by Caspar David Friedrich

=== By subject ===
- List of paintings of Abraham Lincoln
- List of paintings of George Washington
- List of paintings of John Adams
- List of paintings of Thomas Jefferson

== See also ==
- Index of painting-related articles
- Art techniques and materials
