= Reproductive imagination =

Reproductive imagination (also known as simple memory recall) is an activity in which previously seen objects or images are recalled from memory and reproduced in front of the mind's eye.

Reproductive imagination is contrasted to productive or constructive imagination.

== Neuroscience ==
On a neurological level, simple recall involves activation of an existing object-encoding neuronal ensemble in the posterior cortical hot zone. According to binding-by-synchrony hypothesis synchronous resonant activity of the neuronal ensemble results in conscious perception of the object.
