= Posterior cortical hot zone =

Part of the neocortex

The term posterior cortical hot zone was coined by Christof Koch and colleagues to describe the part of the neocortex closely associated with the minimal neural substrate essential for conscious perception. The posterior cortical hot zone includes sensory cortical areas in the parietal, temporal, and occipital lobes. It is the "sensory" cortex, much as the frontal cortex is the "action" cortex.

When parts of the posterior cortex are damaged, whole modalities of sensory experience disappear from both waking and dreaming. For example, individuals with a lesion in the Visual area V4 often do not perceive color and dream in black-and-white; those with a lesion in the Visual area V5/MT do not perceive motion and do not dream of motion; subjects with a lesion to fusiform gyrus are impaired in face perception and also do not dream of faces. Compare that to lesions of the cerebellum or frontal cortex that have little effect on sensory experience.

== Object encoding in the posterior cortical hot zone ==
The sensory component (shape, color, texture) of each object stored in memory is physically encoded by neurons of the posterior cortical hot zone in structures called neuronal ensembles (NEs), neuronal assemblies, neural cliques, or cognits. When one recalls any object, the object-encoding neuronal ensemble (objectNE) in the posterior cortical hot zone activates into synchronous resonant activity that results in conscious perception of the object. The objectNE binding mechanism, based on the Hebbian principle "neurons that fire together, wire together," came to be known as the Binding-by-Synchrony hypothesis.

While the Hebbian principle explains how we perceive a familiar object, it does not explain the infinite number of novel objects that humans can imagine. To account for the limitless constructive imagination, it was proposed that synchronization of independent objectNEs is a general mechanism underlying any novel imaginary experience. When the synchronization of independent objectNEs is driven from the front by the lateral prefrontal cortex, we refer to it as Prefrontal Synthesis; when the synchronization is driven from the back, we refer to it as dreaming or hallucination.
