= Posterior cortex =

Region of the brain

Posterior cortex usually means the posterior (back) part of the complete cerebral cortex and includes the occipital, parietal, and temporal cortices. In other words, the posterior cortex includes all the cerebral cortex without the frontal cortex.

In combination with specific cortical areas, 'posterior cortex' usually refers to the posterior (back) part of that cortical area. For example: the posterior parietal cortex is the posterior part of the parietal cortex and the posterior cingulate cortex is the posterior part of the cingulate cortex.

== Function of the posterior cortex ==
The posterior cortex is the “sensory” cortex, much as the frontal cortex is the “action” cortex. The posterior cortex is responsible for encoding the sensory content (visual, auditory, and tactile) of any experience (both real and imaginary experience). The posterior cortex with the exception of the primary sensory areas (Primary visual cortex (V1), primary auditory cortex, and somatosensory cortex) was called by Christof Koch and colleagues the posterior cortical hot zone for its close association with the minimal neural substrate essential for conscious perception.
