= List of paintings by Georges Lebacq =

This list is a non-exhaustive list of paintings by Georges Lebacq. Certain paintings or drawings have disappeared. Others are in Beaux-Arts Museum of Mons, the Royal Museums of Fine Arts of Belgium in Brussels, and the Museum of Hunting in Senlis, France.

== Belgian period ==
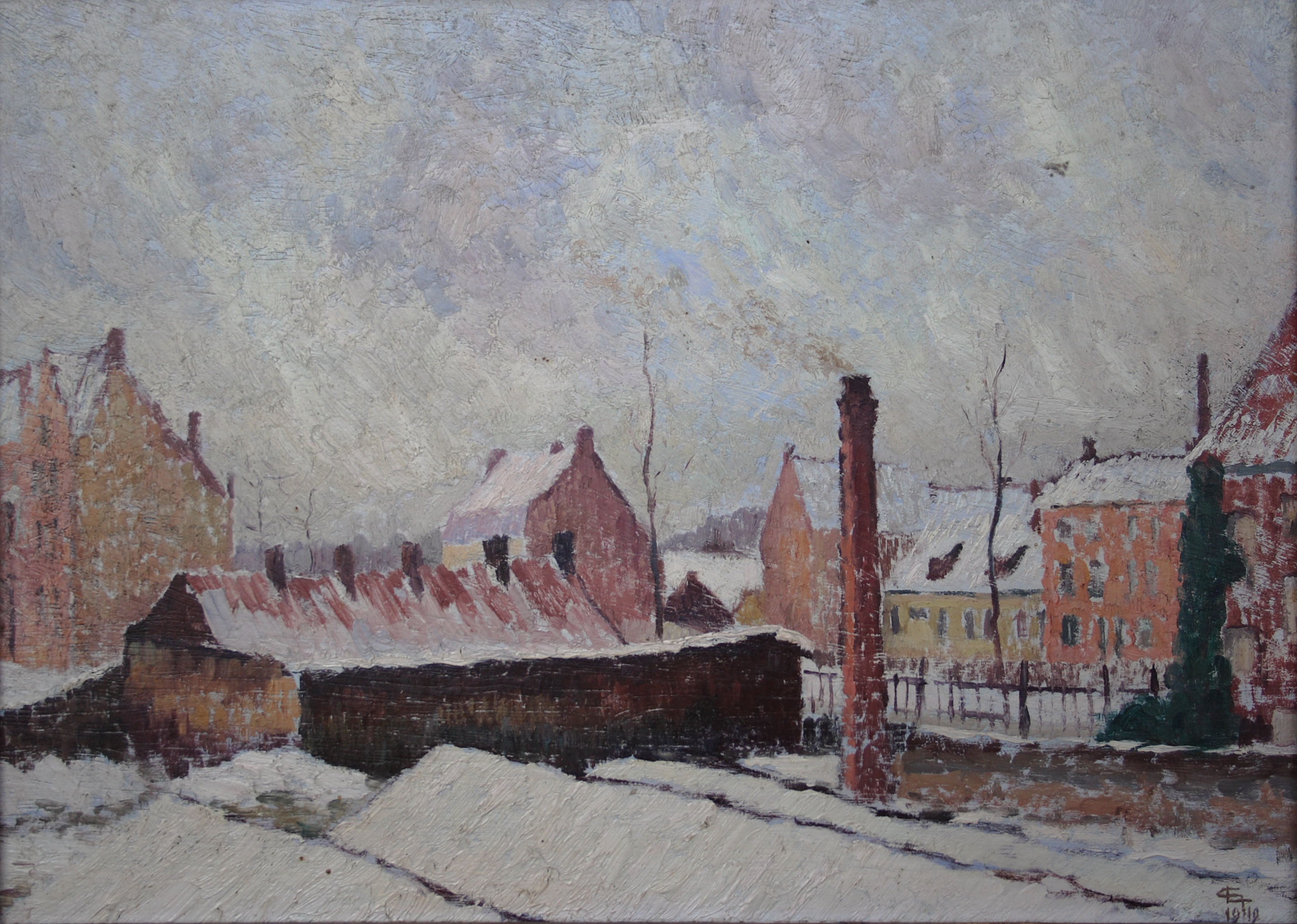
Georges Émile Lebacq, 1919 Neige à Bruges

- Petite dune (Wenduyne sur mer – Flandre)
- Une Ferme en Flandre
- Pignon à Reninghe (Flandre)
- La rue du Corbeau (Bruges – Flandre)
- Neige (Bruges – Flandre) Sketch, private Collection
- Chaland à Bruges (Bruges – Flandre) Drawing
- Canal à Bruges (Bruges – Flandre) Drawing, BAM (Beaux-Arts Museum of Mons (Belgium)
- A Knocke (Knocke – Flandre) Drawing

== Provençal period at Cagnes sur Mer ==
- Rochers – Matinée, La Bocca (Alpes Maritimes), BAM (Beaux-Arts Museum of Mons (Belgium)
- L'Olivier – Cros de Cagnes (Alpes Maritimes), Musée de Cagnes sur Mer (Château Grimaldi)
- Sous les Oliviers – Cros de Cagnes (Alpes Maritimes)
- La Jarre Bleue – Cagnes sur Mer (Alpes Maritimes)
- Cros de Cagnes (Alpes Maritimes), private Collection
- Lumière d'été à Cagnes sur Mer (Alpes Maritimes), private Collection
- Nuit (St Paul du Var) Drawing and Charcoal, private Collection

== Back in Belgium during the Great War ==
Painter joins the general staff at La Panne as army painter with, in particular, the Belgium painter Alfred Bastien as companion. Many paintings and, especially, very gloomy charcoals, showing ruins and damages at the front of Yser.

- Ruines à Reninghe 1917 (Flandre), private Collection
- Front de l'Yser en 1917 (Flandre), private Collection

== Vaux le Pénil near Melun (Seine et Marne) ==
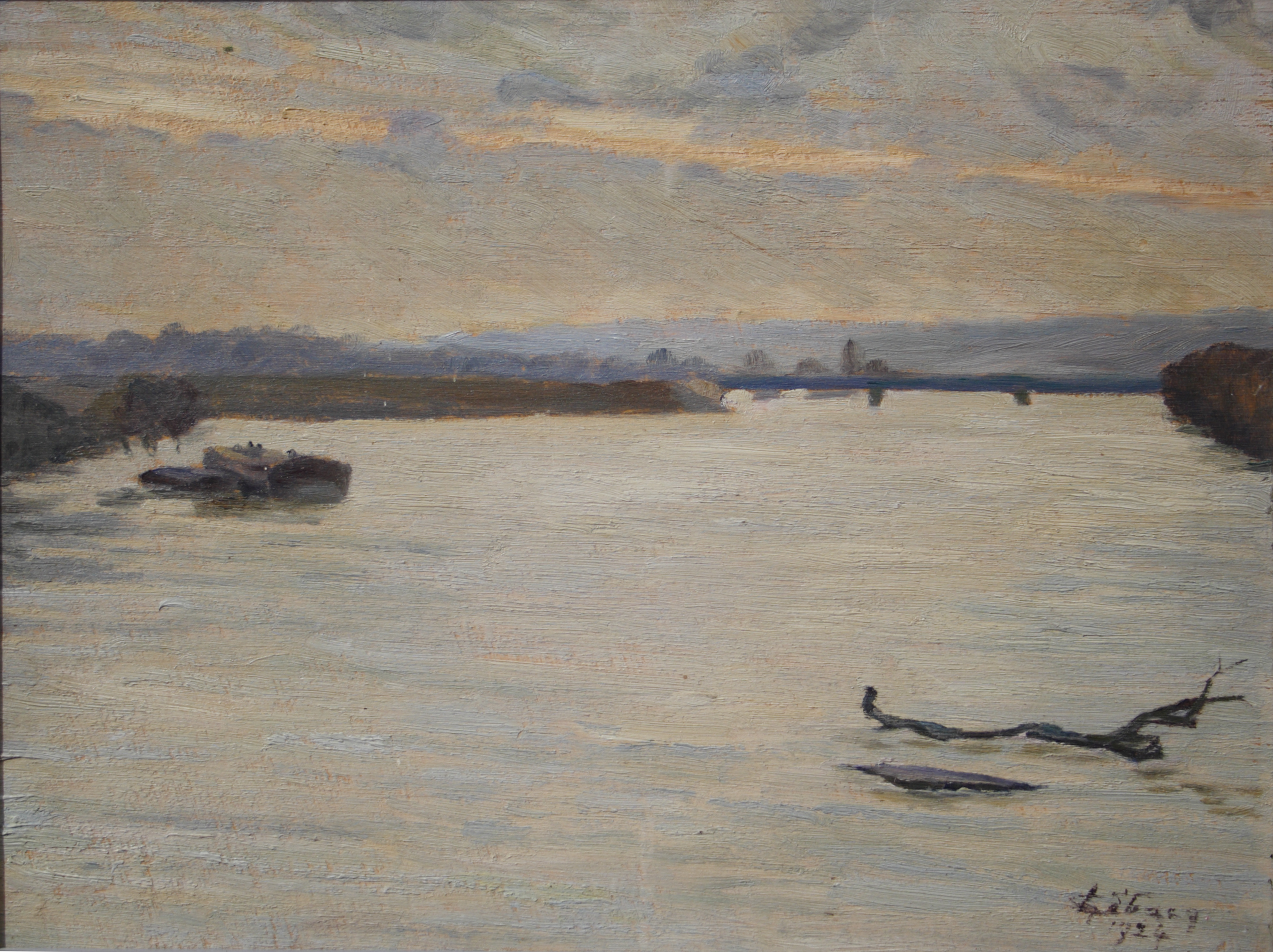
Georges Émile Lebacq, 1924 – Inondation (Flooding) – La Seine à Vaux le Pénil (Seine et Marne), oil on wood panel, 27 x 35 cm

- L'inondation – La Seine à Vaux le Pénil (Seine et Marne), private Collection
- Le Chemin de la Mare des Champs (Vaux le Pénil)
- Saint Liesne (Vaux le Pénil)
- Coin de Parc (Vaux le Pénil), Musée Royal de l'Armée et d'Histoire Militaire, Bruxelles (Belgique)
- La rue Couvet (Vaux le Pénil) Sketch
- Soir (Vaux le Pénil)

== Move to Chamant (Oise) near Senlis (France) ==
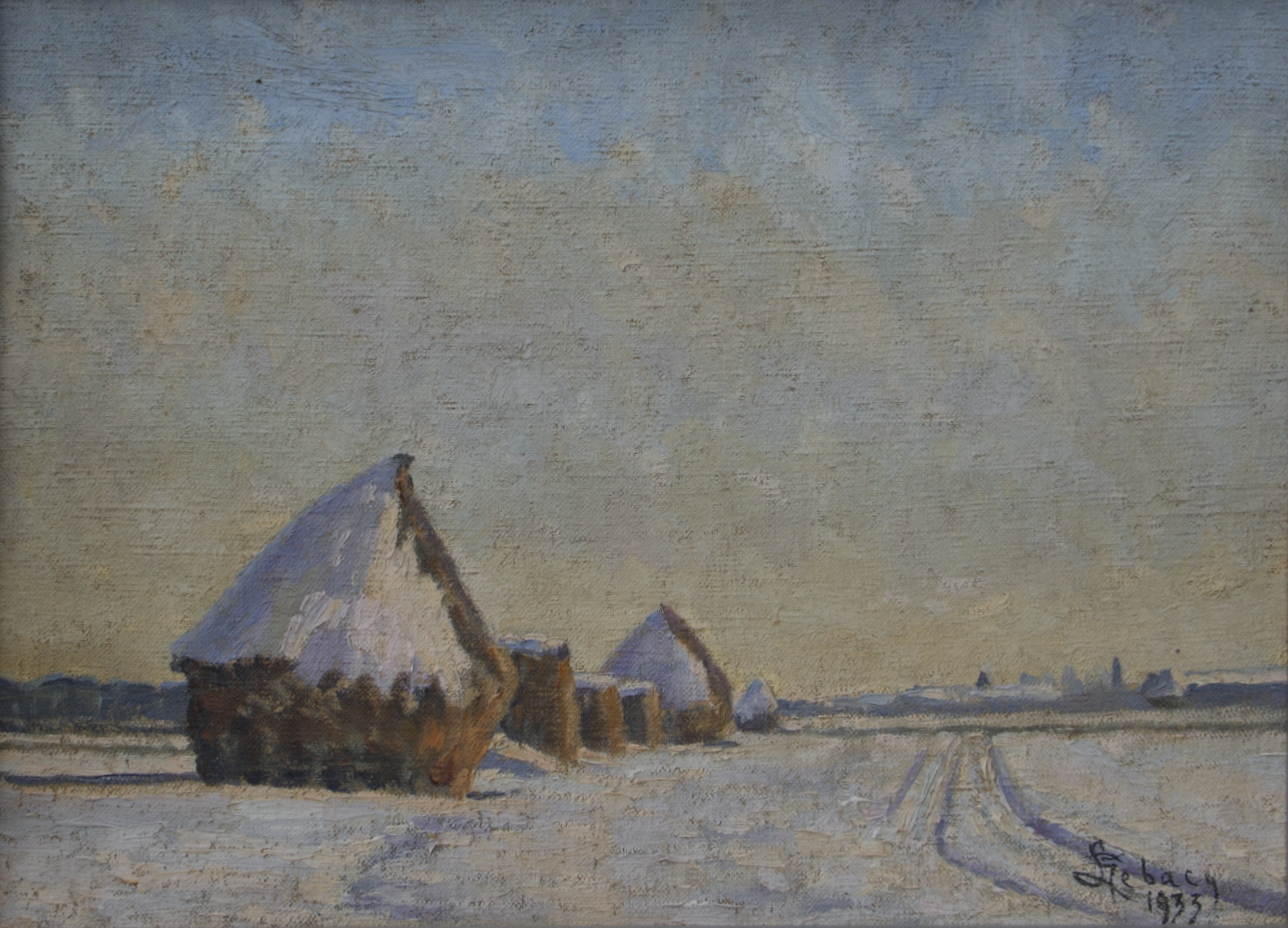
Georges Émile Lebacq, 1928 Meules à Chamant (Oise) en Hiver

- Abandon (Chamant – Oise), private Collection
- La Meule – Temps Gris à Chamant (Chamant – Oise)
- Rue – (Chamant – Oise), private Collection
- La Mare Forêt d'Halatte (Oise), private Collection
- A la Corne du Parc – Soir à Chamant (Chamant – Oise)
- Meules au soleil (Chamant – Oise)
- Conte de Fées – Forêt d'Halatte (Oise)
- Route – Balagny (Oise)
- Le Miroir d'eau – Château d'Ognon (Ognon – Oise), collections du Musée de la Vénerie (Senlis, Oise)
- Silence – Château d'Ognon (Ognon – Oise)
- Poème d'Automne dans le Parc du Château d'Ognon (Ognon – Oise)
- Effet de Neige (Chamant – Oise)
- Le Braconnier (Forêt d'Halatte)
- Place de Saint Frambourg (Senlis – Oise) Dessin, collections du Musée de la Vénerie (Senlis, Oise)
- La Rue de la Tonnellerie (Senlis – Oise) Dessin, collections du Musée de la Vénerie (Senlis, Oise)
- Escalier dans le parc d'Ognon (Ognon – Oise) Dessin, collections du Musée de la Vénerie (Senlis, Oise)
- Meules et chemin à Chamant Dessin, collections du Musée de la Vénerie (Senlis, Oise)
- Escalier dans le jardin d'Ognon (Ognon – Oise) Drawing, collections du Musée de la Vénerie (Senlis, Oise)

== Sojourn in Brittany at St Jacut de la Mer near St Malo ==
- Pointe de la Goule aux Fées (Saint Enogat – Ille et Vilaine), private Collection
- Vaguelettes – Saint Jacut -Ille et Vilaine
- Le Port de Saint Jacut -Ille et Vilaine
- Les Ebiens – Saint Jacut -Ille et Vilaine

== Quercynoise period at Gourdon (France) and Carennac (France) ==
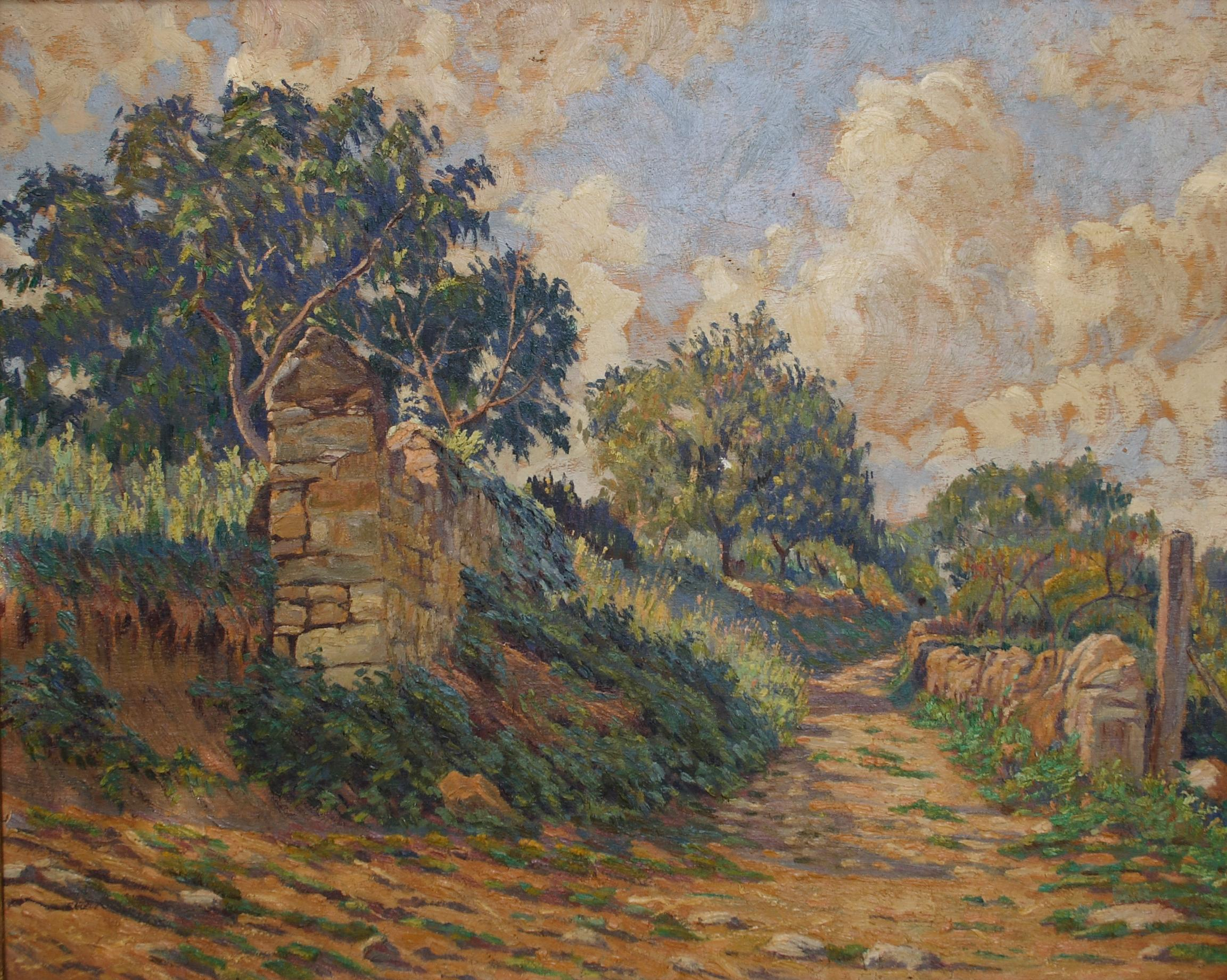
Georges Émile Lebacq, vers 1935 Chemin à Carennac (Lot)

- Chemin à (Carennac – Lot), private Collection
- Le Cloître (Carennac – Lot), private Collection
- Le Pont de Carennac (Lot)
- Le Vieil escalier (Carennac – Lot), BAM (Beaux-Arts Museum of Mons (Belgium)
- L'Hôte invisible (Carennac – Lot), BAM (Beaux-Arts Museum of Mons (Belgium)
- Dordogne – Vue sur Castelnau Bretenoux (Lot), private Collection
- Une Rue à Gourdon (Lot)
- Décoration de la Basilique de Rocamadour (Lot), personages de l'histoire de France : Roland, Saint Louis, Jean le Bon, Charles le Bel, Philippe d'Alsace, Henri II, Blanche de Castille, Louis XI, Marie de Luxembourg
- Vitraux de l'Eglise de Creysse Lot
- Vitraux de l'Eglise de Goudou Lot

== Still lifes ==
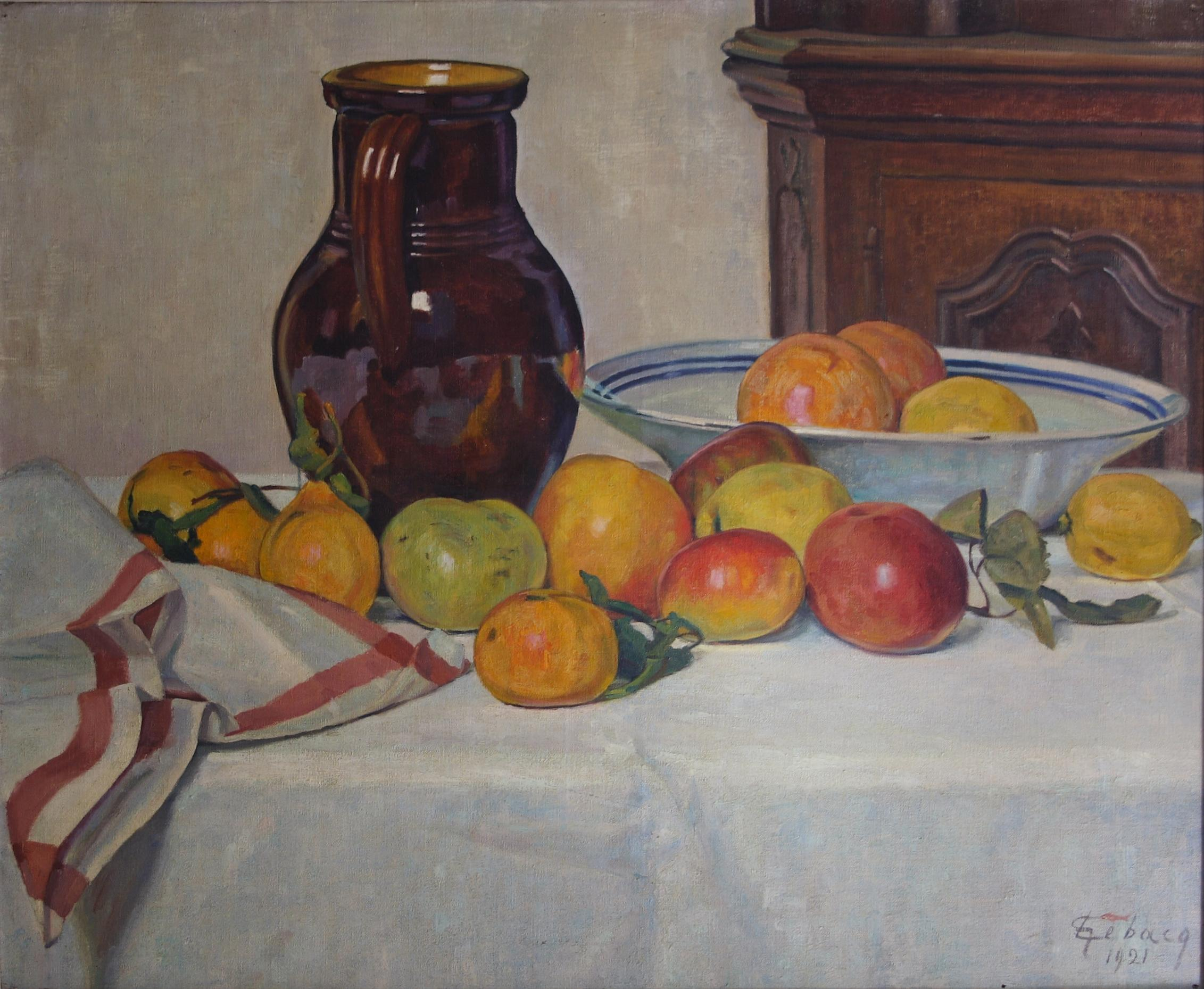
Georges Émile Lebacq, 1921 Fruits

- La Théière bleue
- Cuivre et Pommes
- La Théière Noire
- Le Monstre, BAM (Beaux-Arts Museum of Mons (Belgium)
- La Nappe à carreaux
- Pâtissons
- Courges et Aubergines
- Pommes (Coin de Table)
- Deux Pommes
- La Pie morte, private Collection
- La Belle Pêche
- Le Confiturier ancien
- Fruits, private Collection
- Pommes et Fèves

== Portraits ==
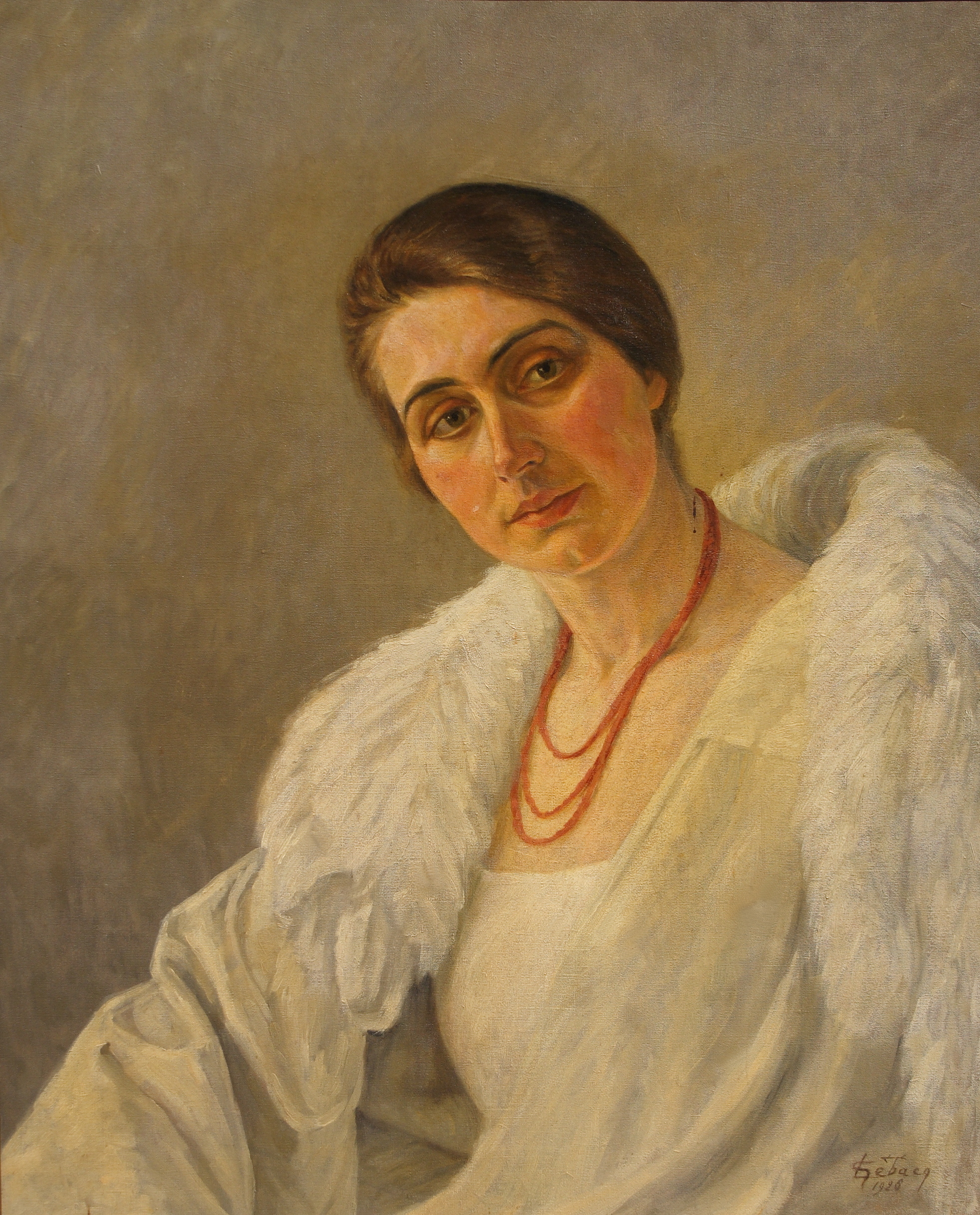
Georges Émile Lebacq, Melle H. Lebacq, 1926

- The blue Portrait, BAM (Beaux-Arts Museum of Mons (Belgium)
- Portrait (Study)
- Portrait of M.M., Canon of Assises, BAM (Beaux-Arts Museum of Mons (Belgium)
- Autoportrait, private Collection
- Autoportrait, in his atelier with his palette and his mock, Musée Royal de l'Armée et d'Histoire Militaire, Bruxelles (Belgique)
- Portrait of Mme Georges Lebacq, private Collection
- Portrait of Mademoiselle Lebacq, Musée Royal de l'Armée et d'Histoire Militaire, Bruxelles (Belgique)
- Portrait of Georges Lebacq (Son) child, private Collection
- Portrait of Georges Lebacq (Son) child (charcoal), private collection
- Portrait of Henri Lebacq (Son), private Collection
- Portrait of the Painter, private Collection

== Miscellaneous ==
- Illustration des "Contes à la Nichée" de Hubert Stiernet 1909
- Illustration des "Petits Contes en sabot" de Louis Delattre 1923
- Fresque allégorique: les Fleuves (1937) pour l'Exposition Internationale de Paris de 1937 (Pavillon de la Ville de Paris Musée d'art moderne de la Ville de Paris)

== Gallery ==
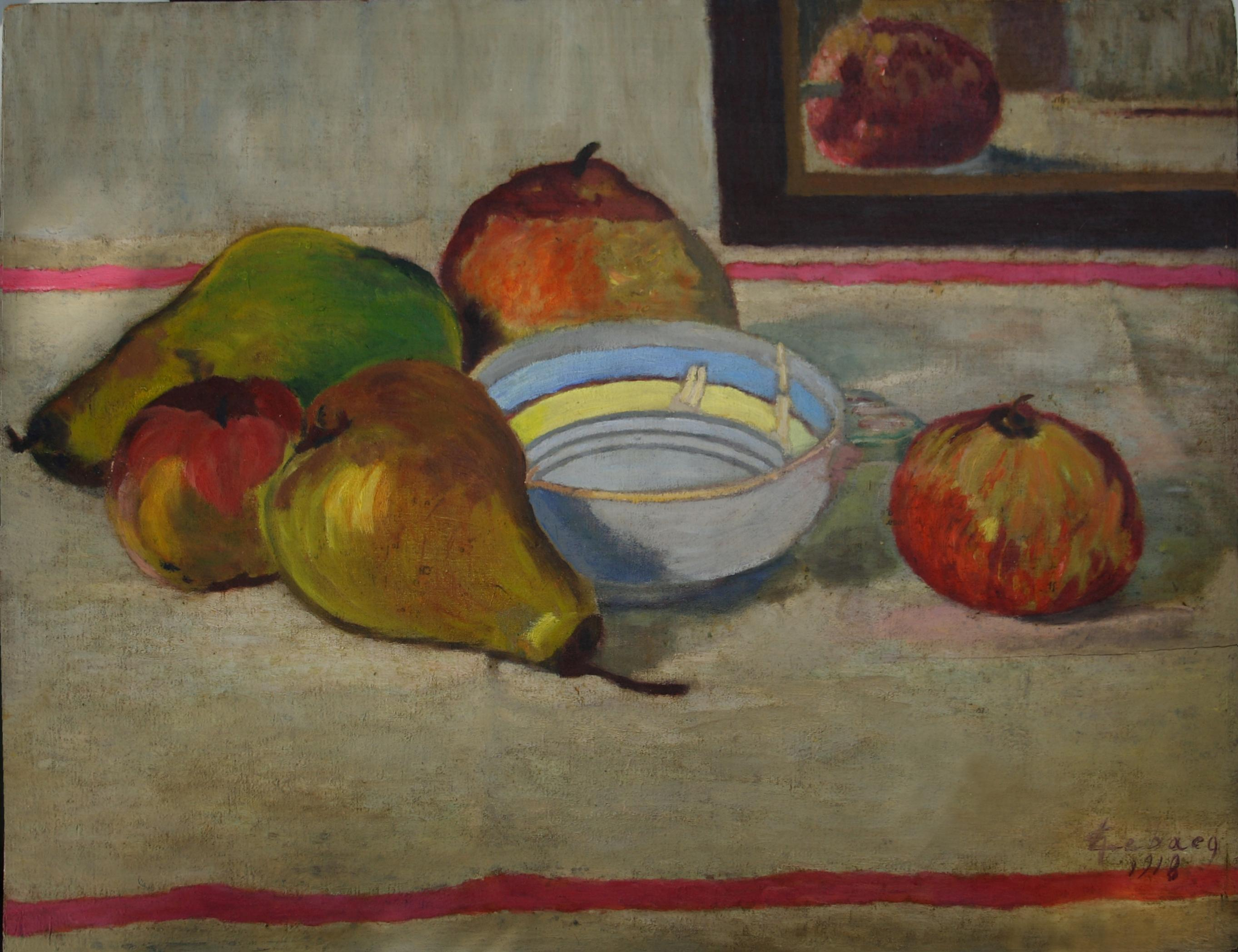

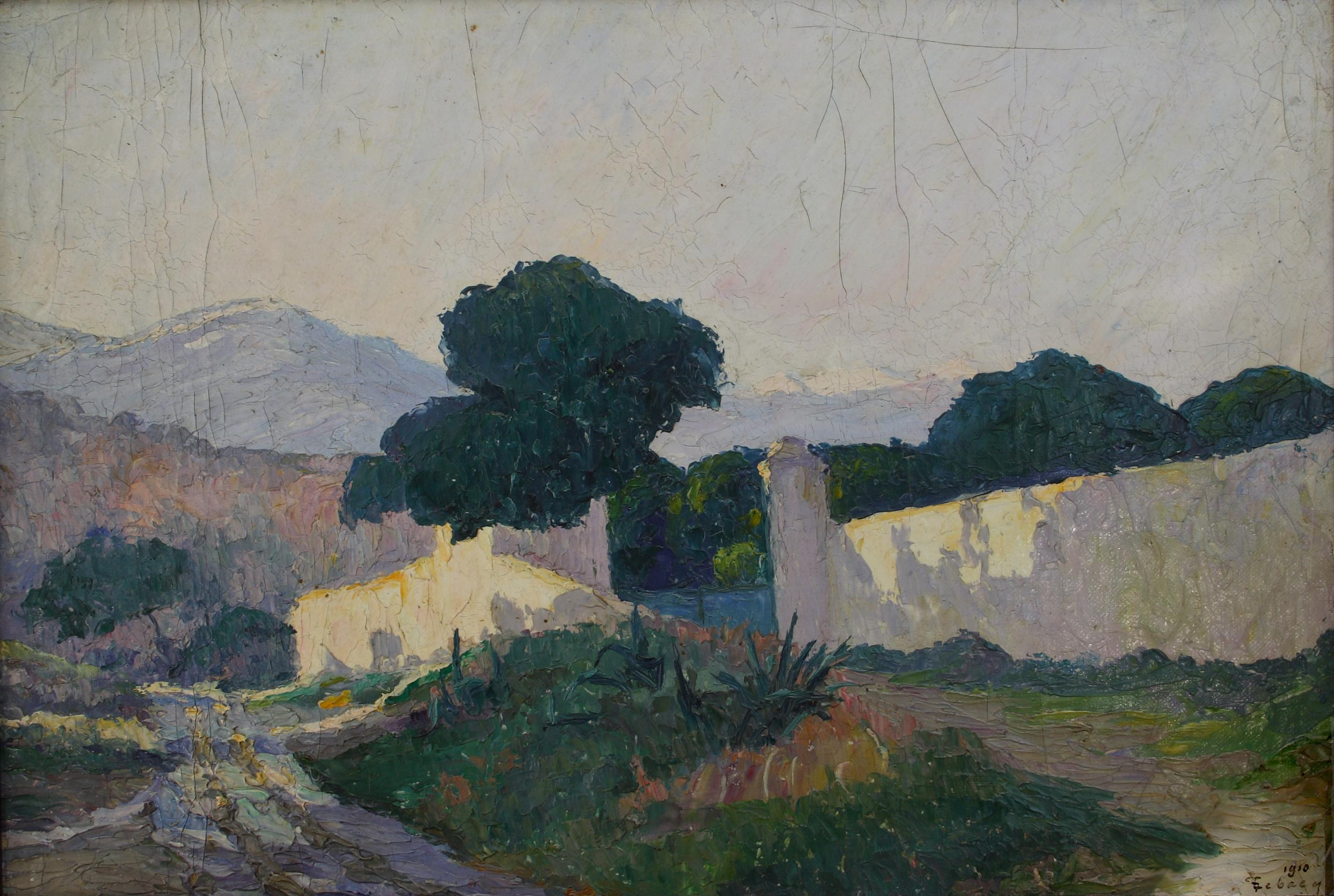

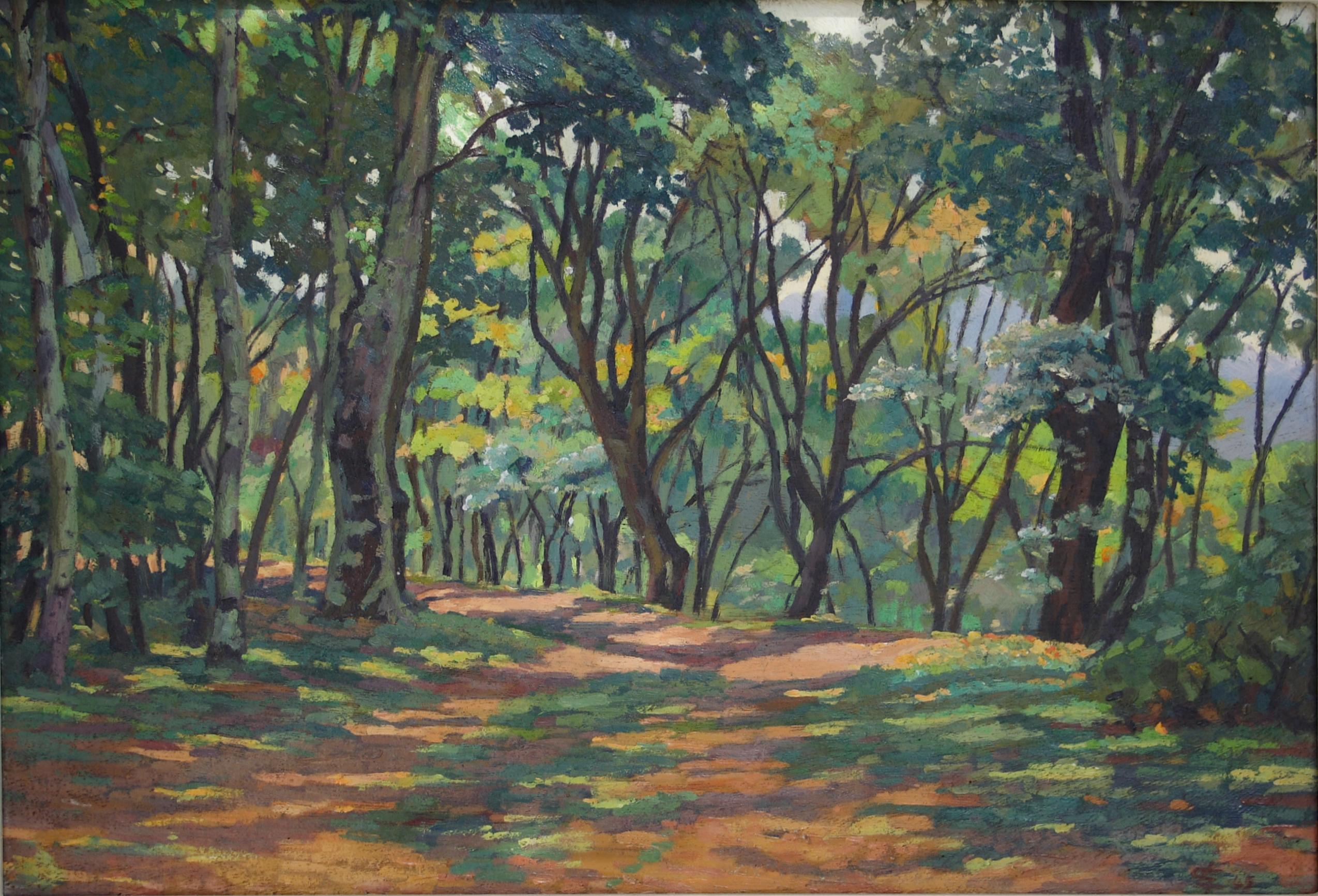

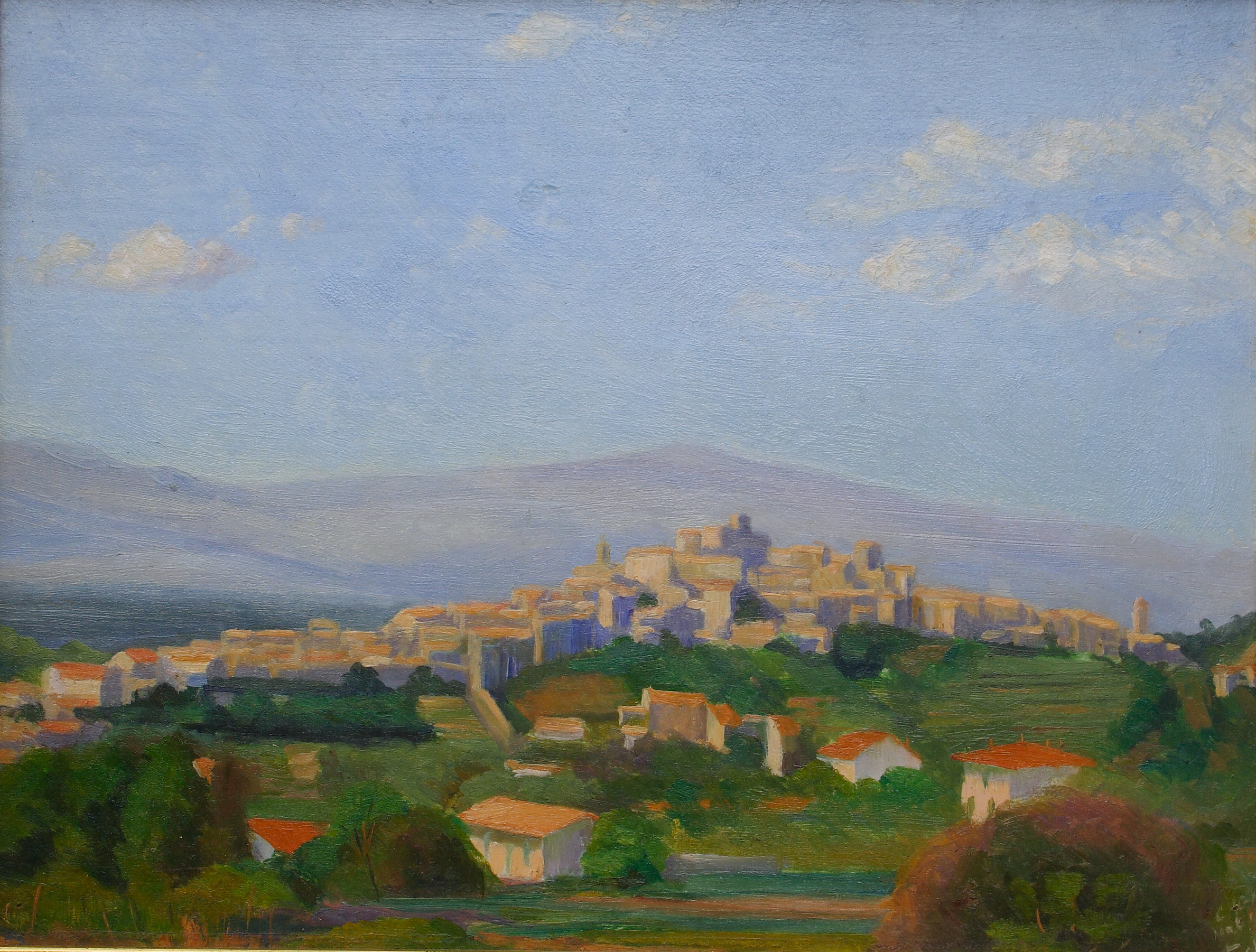

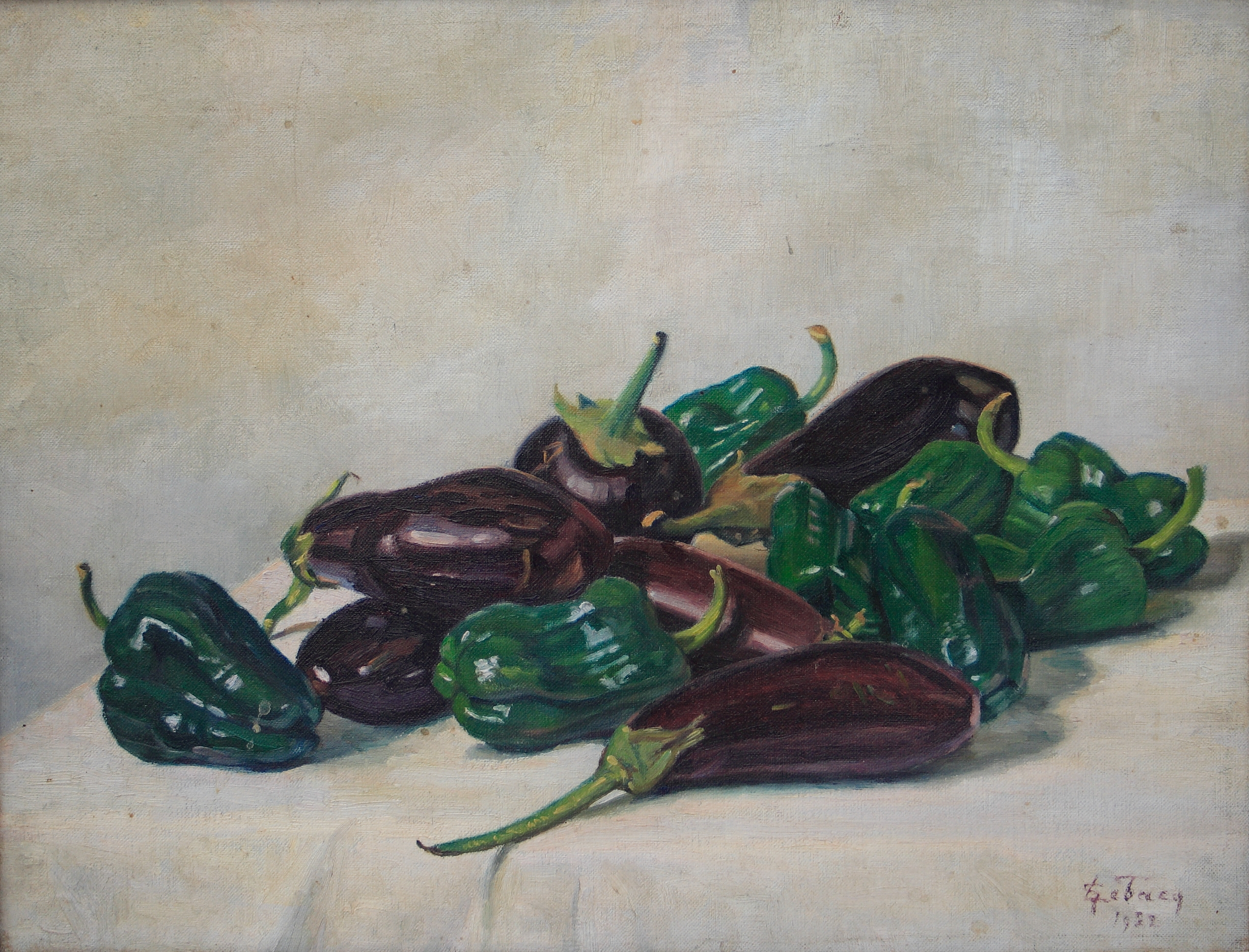

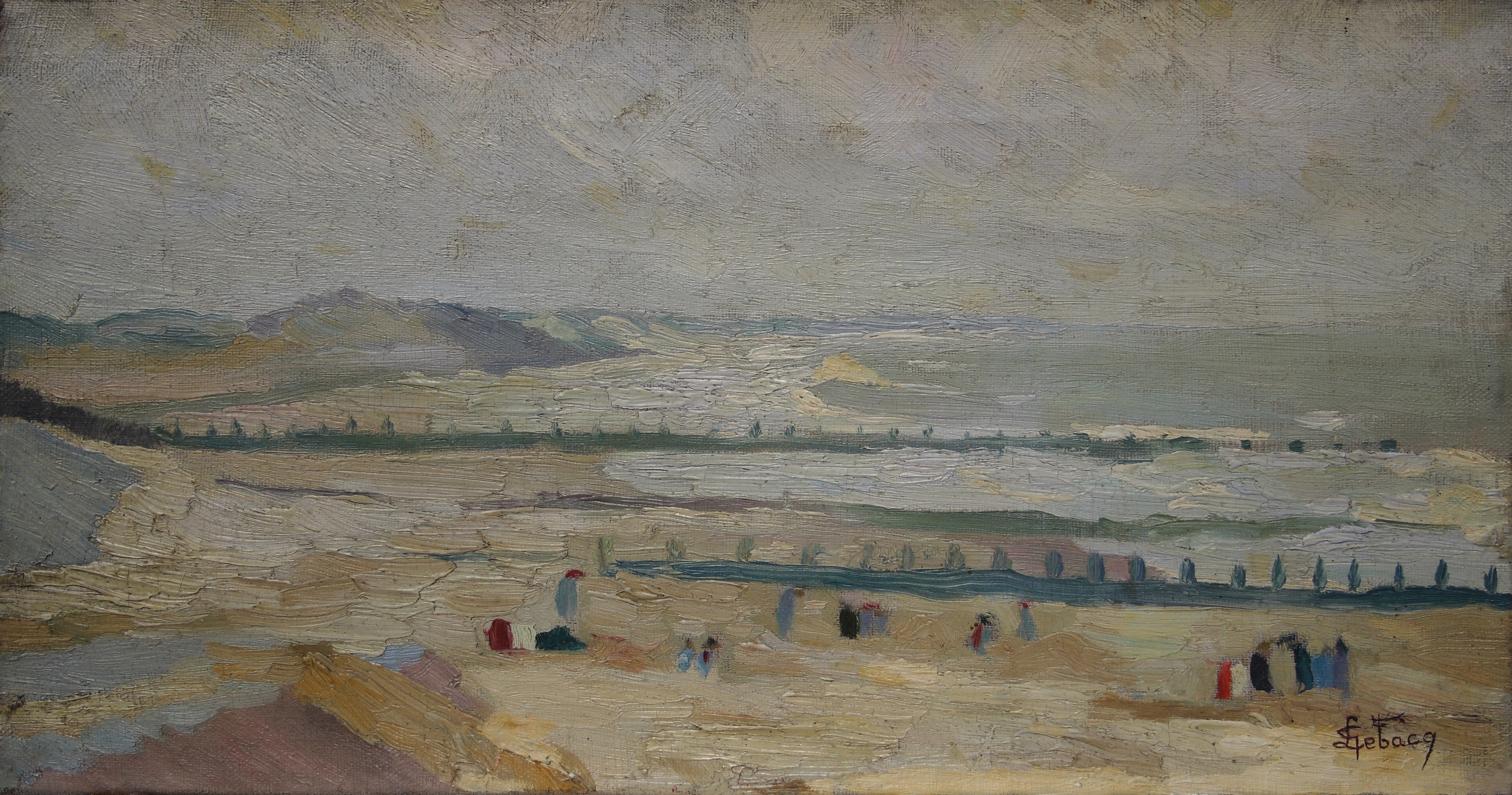

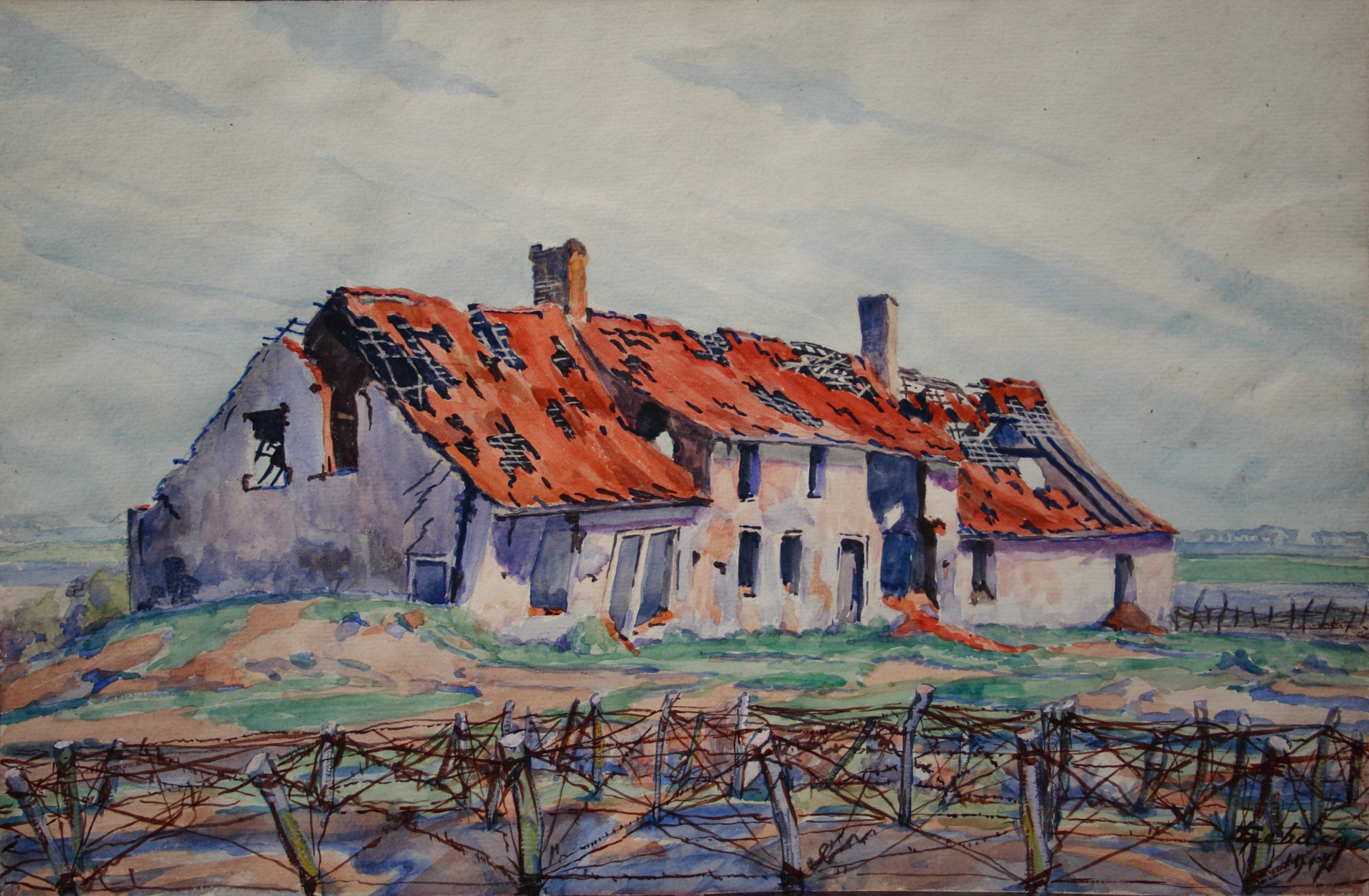

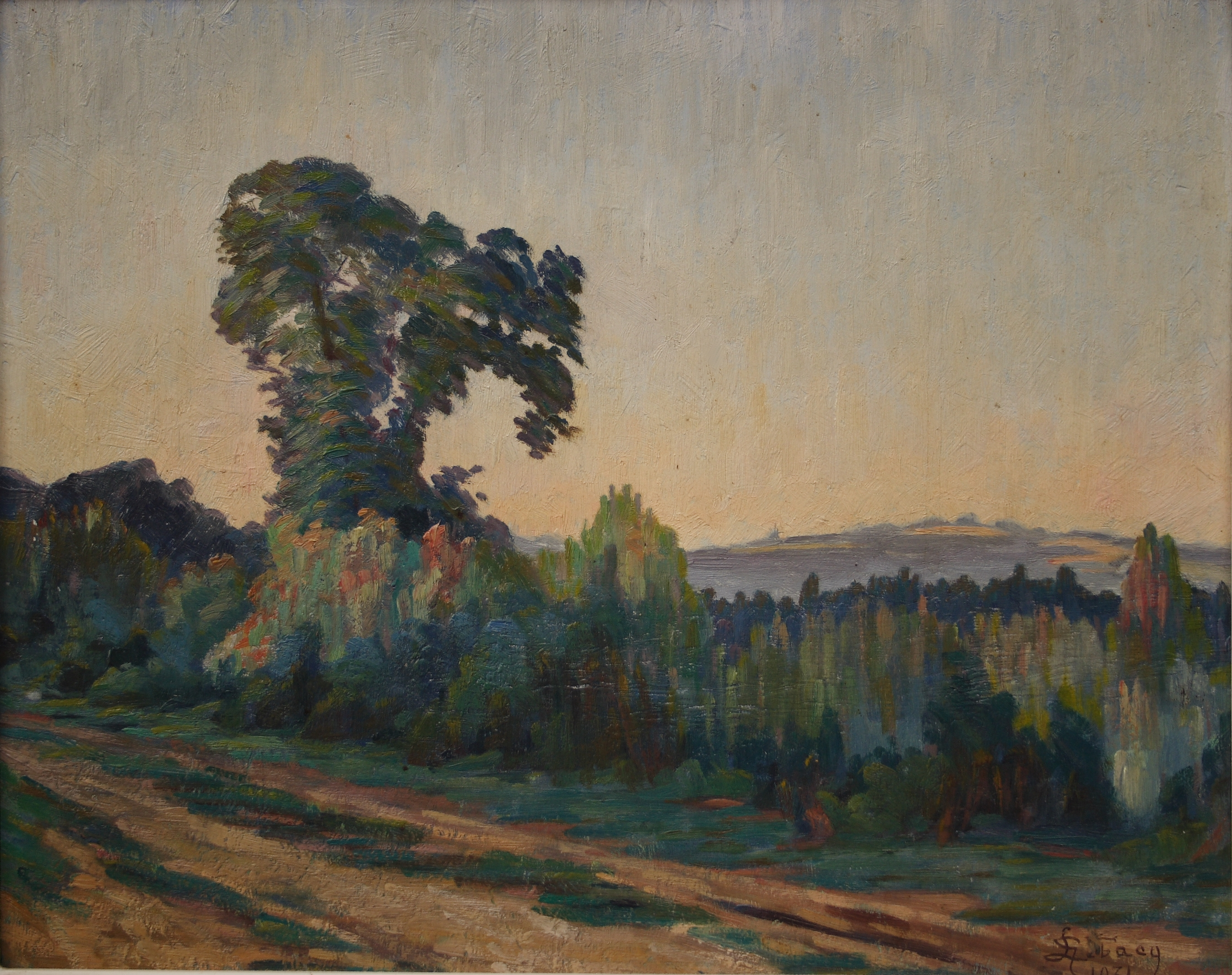

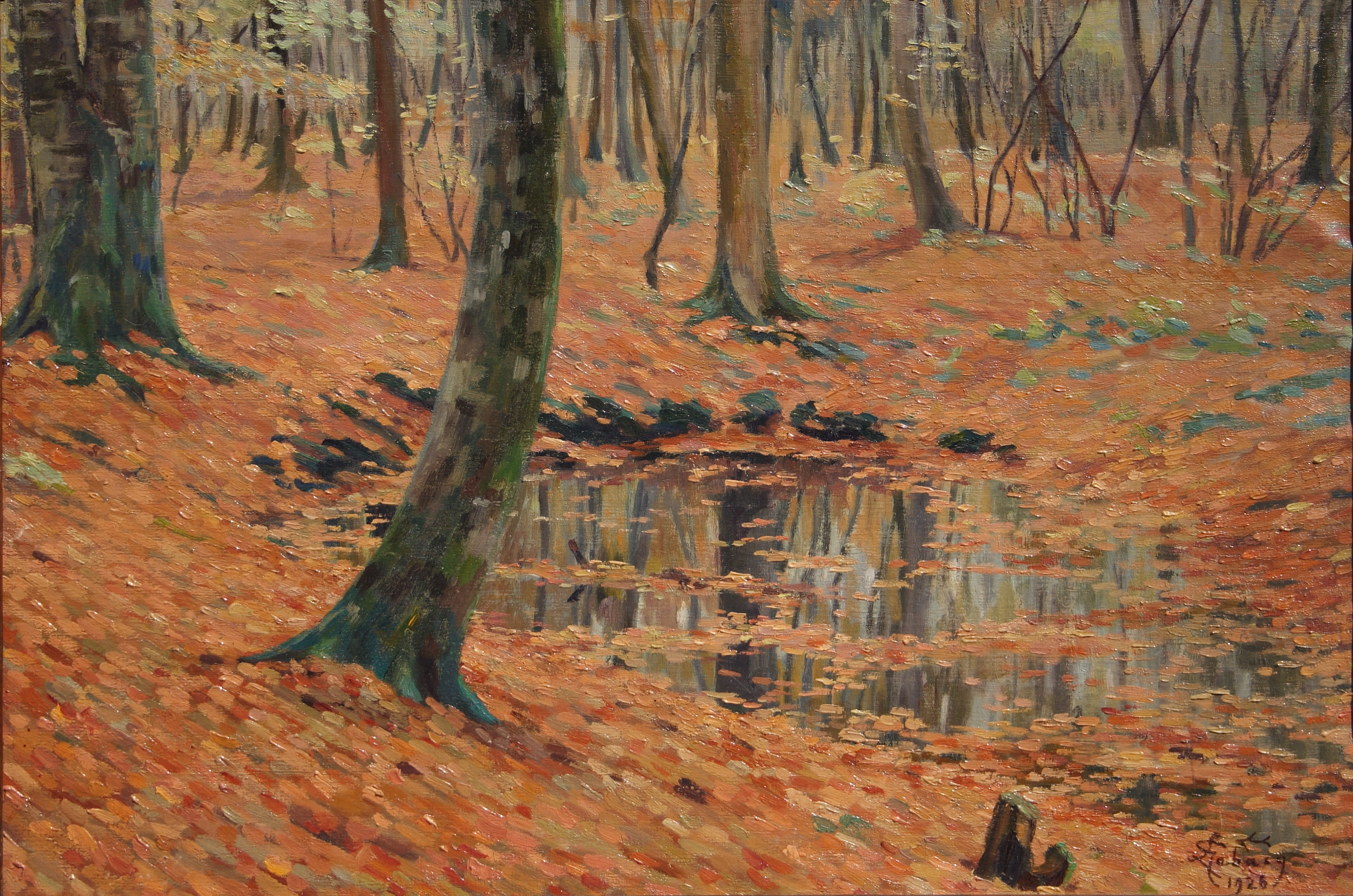

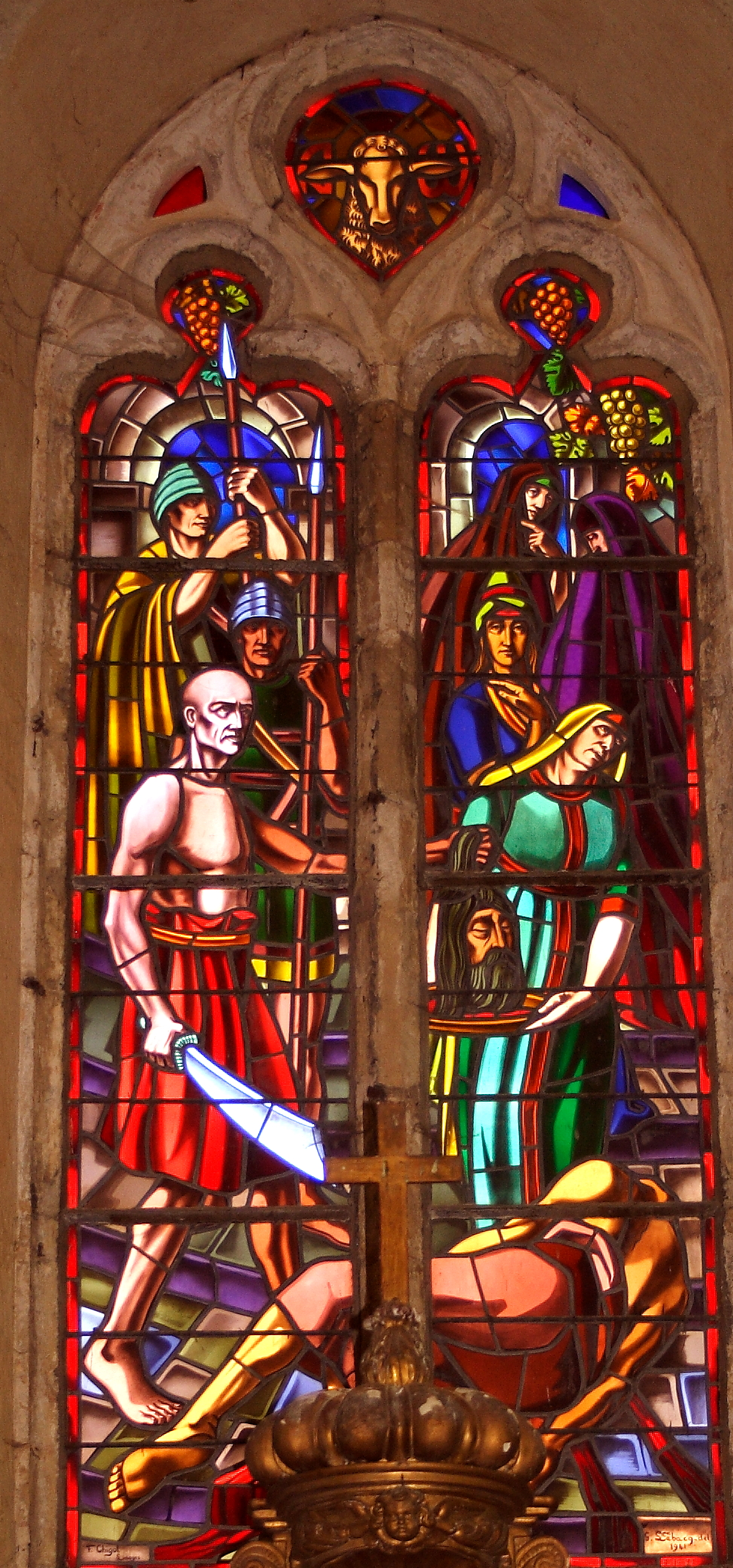
