= Imagination =

Creative ability

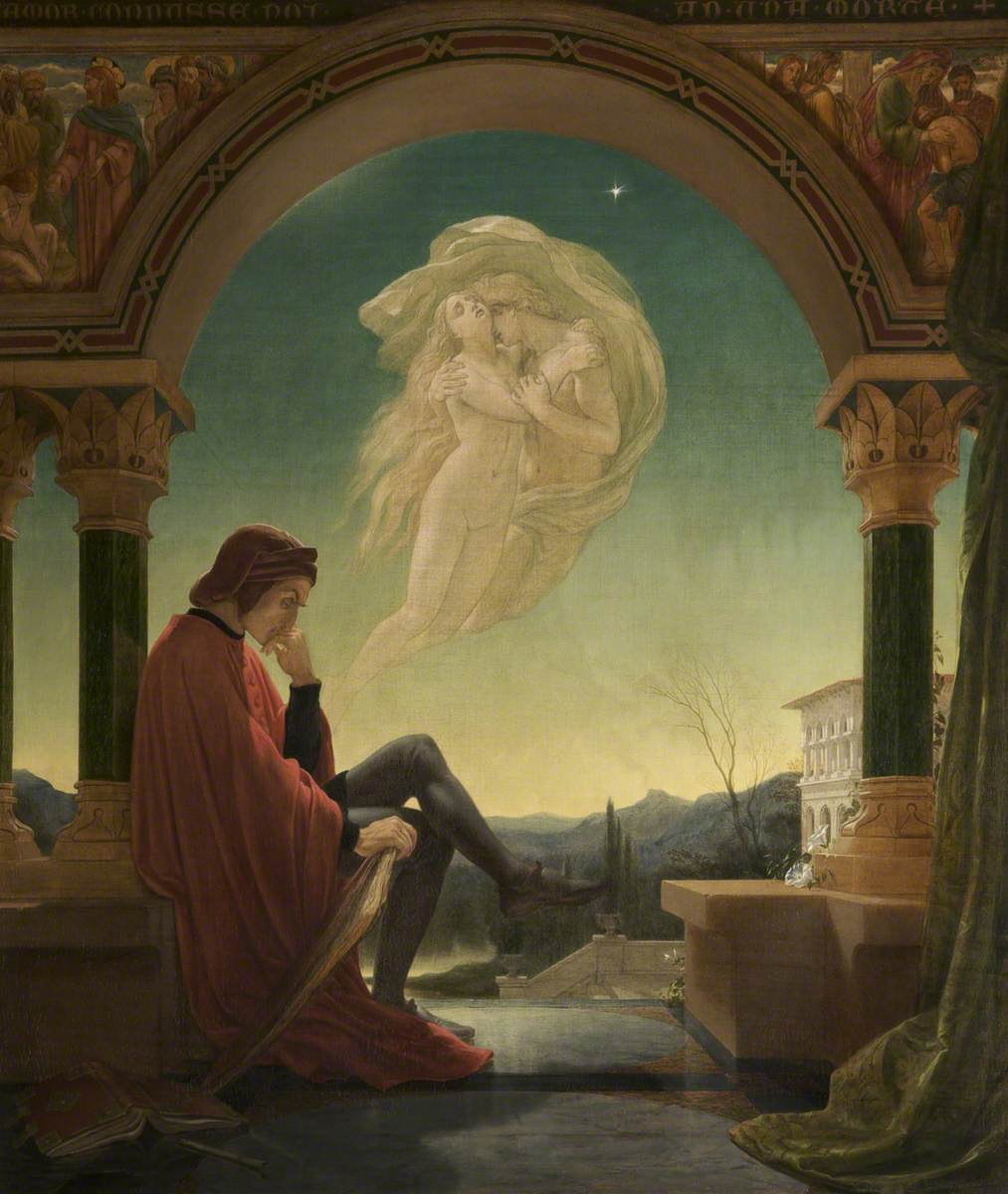
Joseph Noel Paton , Dante Meditating the Episode of Francesca da Rimini and Paolo Malatesta

Imagination is the representation of sensations or physical objects in the mind without any immediate input of the senses. Often described as forming pictures in the mind, it is commonly equated with mental imagery, though imaginary experiences do not have to be purely visual, and can include other sensory experiences, thoughts, and emotions. Imaginings can be re-creations of past experiences, such as vivid memories with or without changes, or completely invented and possibly fantastical scenes. Imagination helps apply knowledge to solve problems and is fundamental to integrating experience and the learning process.

Imagination is the process of developing theories and ideas based on the functioning of the mind through a creative division. Drawing from actual perceptions, imagination employs intricate conditional processes that engage both semantic and episodic memory to generate new or refined ideas. This part of the mind helps develop better and easier ways to accomplish tasks, whether old or new.

A way to train imagination is by listening to and practicing storytelling (narrative), wherein imagination is expressed through stories and writings such as fairy tales, fantasies, and science fiction. When children develop their imagination, they often exercise it through pretend play ("make believe"). They use role-playing to act out what they have imagined, and followingly, they play on by acting as if their make-believe scenarios are actual reality.

== Etymology ==
The English word "imagination" originates from the Latin term "imaginatio," which is the standard Latin translation of the Greek term "φᾰντᾰσῐ́ᾱ" (phantasía). The Latin term also translates to "mental image" or "fancy." The use of the word "imagination" in English can be traced back to the mid-14th century, referring to a faculty of the mind that forms and manipulates images.

== Definition ==
In modern philosophical understanding, imagination is commonly seen as a faculty for creating mental images and for making non-rational, associative transitions among these images.

One view of imagination links it to cognition, suggesting that imagination is a cognitive process in mental functioning. It is also associated with rational thinking in a way that both imaginative and rational thoughts involve the cognitive process that "underpins thinking about possibilities". However, imagination is not considered to be purely a cognitive activity because it is also linked to the body and place. It involves setting up relationships with materials and people, precluding the notion that imagination is confined to the mind.

The psychological view of imagination relates this concept to a cognate term, "mental imagery," which denotes the process of reviving in the mind recollections of objects previously given in sense perception. Since this use of the term conflicts with that of ordinary language, some psychologists prefer to describe this process as "imaging" or "imagery" or to speak of it as "reproductive" as opposed to "productive" or "constructive" imagination. Constructive imagination is further divided into voluntary imagination driven by the lateral prefrontal cortex (LPFC), such as mental rotation, and involuntary imagination (LPFC-independent), such as REM sleep dreaming, daydreaming, hallucinations, and spontaneous insight. In clinical settings, clinicians nowadays increasingly make use of visual imagery for psychological treatment of anxiety disorders, depression, schizophrenia and Parkinson's disease.

== Conceptual history ==
=== Ancient ===
Ancient Greek philosophers conceived imagination, or "phantasia," as working with "pictures" in the sense of mental images. Aristotle, in his work De Anima, identified imagination as a faculty that enables an image to occur within us, a definition associating imagination with a broad range of activities involved in thoughts, dreams, and memories.

In Philebus, Plato discusses daydreaming and considers imagination about the future as the work of a painter within the soul. However, Plato portrayed this painter as an illustrator rather than a creator, reflecting his view of imagination as a representational rather than an inventive faculty.

Greek philosophers typically distinguished imagination from perception and rational thinking: "For imagination is different from either perceiving or discursive thinking, though it is not found without sensation, or judgement without it" (De Anima, iii 3). Aristotle viewed imagination as a faculty that mediates between the senses and intellect. The mental images it manipulates, whether arising from visions, dreams or sensory perception, were thought to be transmitted through the lower parts of the soul, suggesting that these images could be influenced by emotions and primal desires, thereby confusing the judgement of the intellect.

=== Middle Ages ===
In the Middle Ages, the concept of imagination encompassed domains such as religion, literature, artwork, and notably, poetry. Men of science often recognized poets as "imaginative," viewing imagination as the mental faculty that specifically permitted poetry writing. This association, they suggested, lies in the capacity of imagination for image-making and image-forming, which results in a sense of "visualizing" with "the inner eye."

An epitome of this concept is Chaucer's idea of the "mind's eye" in The Man of Law's Tale from The Canterbury Tales (ca. 1390). He described a man who, although blind, was able to "see" with an "eye of his mind":

"That oon of hem was blynd and myghte not see, / But it were with thilke eyen of his mynde / With whiche men seen, after that they ben blynde."

Medieval theories of faculty psychology posited imagination as a faculty of the internal senses (alongside memory and common sense): imagination receives mental images from memory or perception, organizes them, and transmits them to the reasoning faculties, providing the intellect with sense data. In this way, it enables the reshaping of images from sense perception (even in the absence of perception, such as in dreams), performing a filtering function of reality.

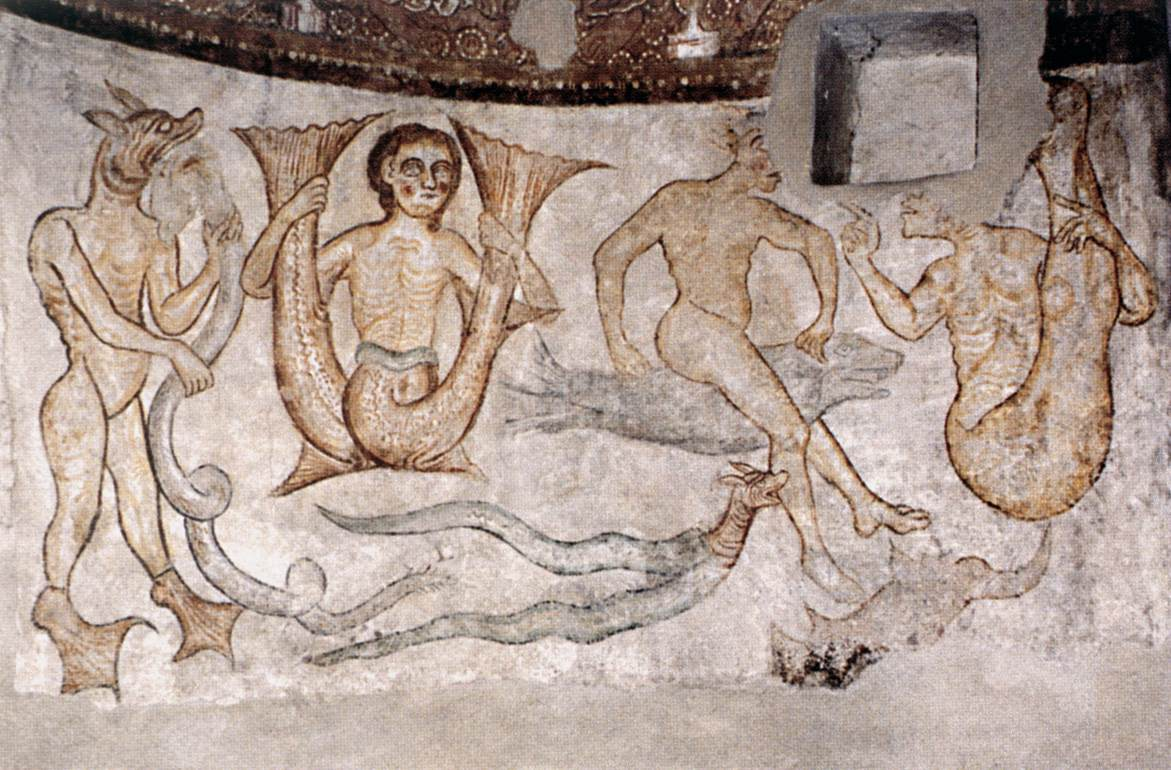
Medieval paintings of imaginary creatures, as seen in frescos and manuscripts, often combined body parts of different animals, and even humans.

Although not attributed the capacity for creations, imagination was thought to combine images received from memory or perception in creative ways, allowing for the invention of novel concepts or expressions. For example, it could fuse images of "gold" and "mountain" to produce the idea of a "golden mountain."

In medieval artistic works, imagination served the role of combining images of perceivable things to portray legendary, mysterious, or extraordinary creatures. This can be seen in the depiction of a Mongolian in the Grandes Chroniques de France(1241), as well as in the portrayal of angels, demons, hell, and the apocalypse in Christian religious paintings.

=== Renaissance and early modern ===
The Renaissance saw the revival of classical texts and the celebration for men's dignity, yet scholars of the time did not significantly contribute to the conceptual understanding of "imagination." Marsilio Ficino, for example, did not regard artistic creations such as painting, sculpture and poetry as privileged forms of human creativity, nor did he attribute creativity to the faculty of imagination. Instead, Ficino posited that imagination could be the vehicle through which divine intervention transmits insights in the form of images, which ultimately facilitates the creation of art.

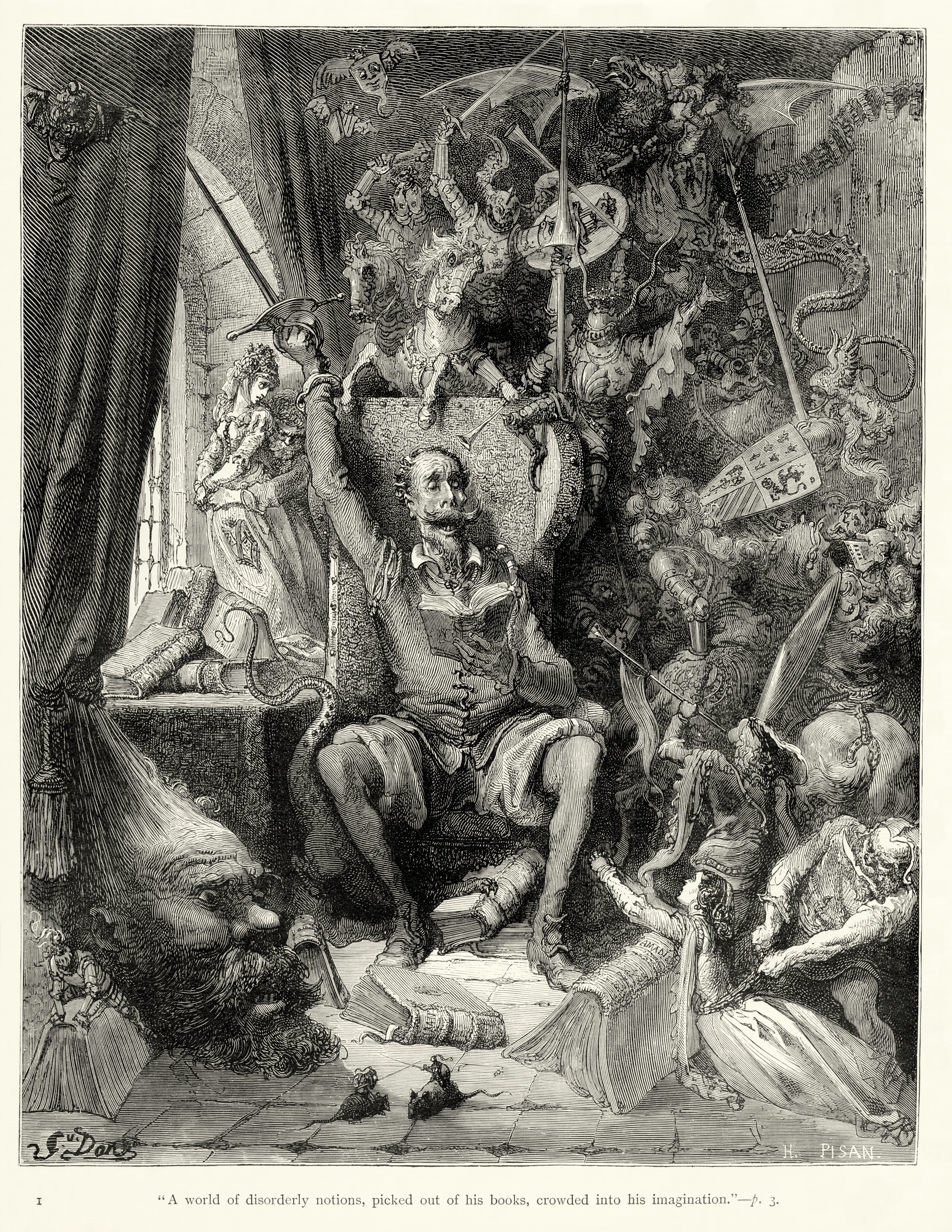
Don Quixote, engrossed in reading books of chivalry.

Nevertheless, the groundwork laid by humanists made it easier for later thinkers to develop the connection between imagination and creativity. Early modern philosophers began to consider imagination as a trait or ability that an individual could possess. Miguel de Cervantes, influenced by Spanish physician and philosopher Juan Huarte de San Juan, crafted the iconic character Don Quixote, who epitomized Huarte's idea of "wits full of invention." This type of wit was thought to be typically found in individuals for whom imagination was the most prominent component of their "ingenium" (Spanish: ingenio; term meaning close to "intellect").

Early modern philosophers also started to acknowledge imagination as an active, cognitive faculty, although it was principally seen as a mediator between sense perception (Latin: sensus) and pure understanding (Latin: intellectio pura). René Descartes, in Meditations on First Philosophy (1641), interpreted imagination as a faculty actively focusing on bodies (corporeal entities) while being passively dependent on stimuli from different senses. In the writing of Thomas Hobbes, imagination became a key element of human cognition.

In the 16th and 17th centuries, the connotations of imagination" extended to many areas of early modern civic life. Juan Luis Vives noted the connection between imagination and rhetoric skills. Huarte extended this idea, linking imagination to any disciplines that necessitates "figures, correspondence, harmony, and proportion," such as medical practice and the art of warfare. Additionally, Galileo used the concept of imagination to conduct thought experiments, such as asking readers to imagine the direction a stone released from a sling would fly.

=== Enlightenment and thereafter ===
By the Age of Enlightenment, philosophical discussions frequently linked the power of imagination with creativity, particularly in aesthetics. William Duff was among the first to identify imagination as a quality of genius, distinguishing it from talent by emphasizing that only genius is characterized by creative innovation. Samuel Taylor Coleridge distinguished between imagination expressing realities of an imaginal realm above our mundane personal existence, and "fancy", or fantasy, which represents the creativity of the artistic soul. In Preliminary Discourse to the Encyclopedia of Diderot (French: Discours Préliminaire des Éditeurs), d'Alembert referred to imagination as the creative force for Fine Arts.

Immanuel Kant, in his Critique of Pure Reason (German: Kritik der reinen Vernunft), viewed imagination (German: Einbildungskraft) as a faculty of intuition, capable of making "presentations," i.e., sensible representations of objects that are not directly present. Kant distinguished two forms of imagination: productive and reproductive. Productive imagination functions as the original source of the presentation of an object, thus preceding experience; while reproductive imagination generates presentations derived from past experiences, recalling empirical intuitions it previously had. Kant's treatise linked imagination to cognition, perception, aesthetic judgement, artistic creation, and morality.

The Kantian idea prepared the way for Fichte, Schelling and the Romantics to transform the philosophical understanding of it into an authentic creative force, associated with genius, inventive activity, and freedom. In the work of Hegel, imagination, though not given as much importance as by his predecessors, served as a starting point for the defense of Hegelian phenomenology. Hegel distinguished between a phenomenological account of imagination, which focuses on the lived experience and consciousness, and a scientific, speculative account, which seeks to understand the nature and function of imagination in a systematic and theoretical manner.

=== Modern ===
Between 1913 and 1916, Carl Jung developed the concept of "active imagination" and introduced it into psychotherapy. For Jung, active imagination often includes working with dreams and the creative self via imagination or fantasy. It is a meditation technique wherein the contents of one's unconscious are translated into images, narratives, or personified as separate entities, thus serving as a bridge between the conscious "ego" and the unconscious.

Albert Einstein famously said: "Imagination... is more important than knowledge. Knowledge is limited. Imagination encircles the world."

Nikola Tesla described imagination as: "When I get an idea I start at once building it up in my imagination. I change the construction, make improvements and operate the device in my mind. It is absolutely immaterial to me whether I run my turbine in thought or test it in my shop. I even note if it is out of balance. There is no difference whatever, the results are the same. In this way I am able to rapidly develop and perfect a conception without touching anything."

The phenomenology of imagination is discussed in The Imaginary: A Phenomenological Psychology of the Imagination (French: L'Imaginaire: Psychologie phénoménologique de l'imagination), also published under the title The Psychology of the Imagination, a 1940 book by Jean-Paul Sartre. In this book, Sartre propounded his concept of imagination, with imaginary objects being "melanges of past impressions and recent knowledge," and discussed what the existence of imagination shows about the nature of human consciousness. Based on Sartre's work, subsequent thinkers extended this idea into the realm of sociology, proposing ideas such as imaginary and the ontology of imagination.

=== Cross-cultural ===
Imagination has been, and continues to be a well-acknowledged concept in many cultures, particularly within religious contexts, as an image-forming faculty of the mind. In Buddhist aesthetics, imagination plays a crucial role in religious practice, especially in visualization practices, which include the recollection of the Buddha's body, visualization of celestial Buddhas and Buddha-fields (Pure Lands and mandalas), and devotion to images.

In Zhuang Zi's Taoism, imagination is perceived as a complex mental activity that is championed as a vital form of cognition. It is defended on empathetic grounds but discredited by the rational intellect as only a presentation and fantasy.

== In psychological research ==
=== Memory ===
Memory and mental imagery are two mental activities involved in the process of imagination, each influencing the other. Functional magnetic resonance imaging (fMRI) technology shows that remembering and imagining activate the identical parts of the brain. When compared to the recall of common ideas, the generation of new and old original ideas exhibits a similar activation pattern, particularly in the bilateral parahippocampal and medial prefrontal cortex (mPFC) regions. This suggests that the construction of new ideas relies on processes similar to those in the reconstruction of original ideas from episodic memory.

=== Perception ===
Piaget posited that a person's perceptions depend on their world view. The world view is the result of arranging perceptions into existing imagery by imagination. Piaget cites the example of a child saying that the moon is following her when she walks around the village at night. Like this, perceptions are integrated into the world view so that they make sense. Imagination is needed to make sense of perceptions.

=== Brain activation ===
The neocortex and thalamus are crucial in controlling the brain's imagination, as well as other functions such as consciousness and abstract thought. Imagination involves many different brain functions, including emotions, memory, and thoughts.

Visual imagery involves a network of brain areas from the frontal cortex to sensory areas, overlapping with the default mode network, and can function much like a weak version of afferent perception.

A study that used fMRI while subjects were asked to imagine precise visual figures, to mentally disassemble them, or mentally blend them, showed activity in the occipital, frontoparietal, posterior parietal, precuneus, and dorsolateral prefrontal regions of the subject's brains.

== Evolutionary theory ==
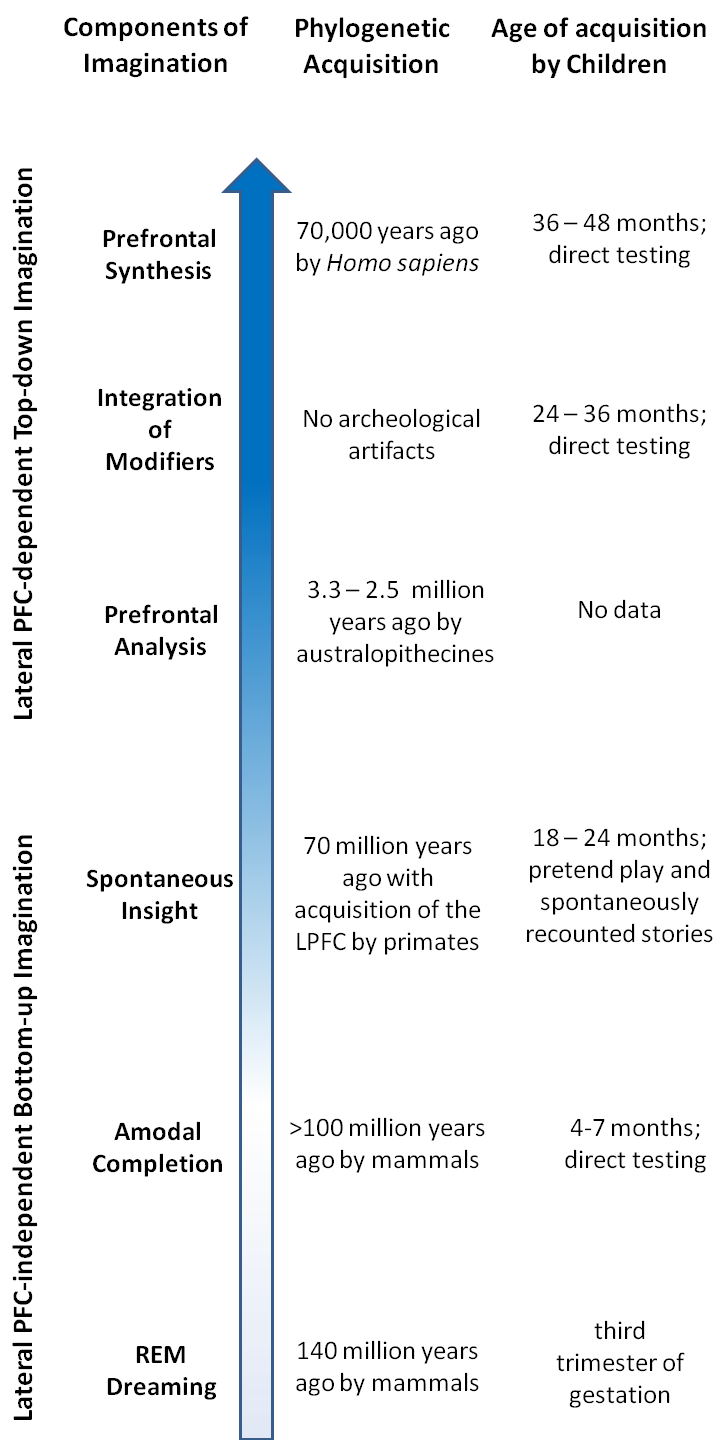
Phylogenesis and ontogenesis of various components of imagination

Phylogenetic acquisition of imagination was a gradual process. The simplest form of imagination, REM-sleep dreaming, evolved in mammals with acquisition of REM sleep 140 million years ago. Spontaneous insight improved in primates with acquisition of the lateral prefrontal cortex 70 million years ago. After hominins split from the chimpanzee line 6 million years ago they further improved their imagination. Prefrontal analysis was acquired 3.3 million years ago when hominins started to manufacture Mode One stone tools. Progress in stone tools culture to Mode Two stone tools by 2 million years ago signifies remarkable improvement of prefrontal analysis. The most advanced mechanism of imagination, prefrontal synthesis, was likely acquired by humans around 70,000 years ago and resulted in behavioral modernity. This leap toward modern imagination has been characterized by paleoanthropologists as the "Cognitive revolution", "Upper Paleolithic Revolution", and the "Great Leap Forward".

== Moral imagination ==
Moral imagination usually describes the mental capacity to find answers to ethical questions and dilemmas through the process of imagination and visualization. Different definitions of "moral imagination" can be found in the literature.

The philosopher Mark Johnson described it as "an ability to imaginatively discern various possibilities for acting in a given situation and to envision the potential help and harm that are likely to result from a given action."

In one proposed example, Hitler's assassin Claus von Stauffenberg was said to have decided to dare to overthrow the Nazi regime as a result (among other factors) of a process of "moral imagination". His willingness to kill Hitler was less due to his compassion for his comrades, his family, or friends living at that time, but from thinking about the potential problems of later generations and people he did not know. In other words, through a process of moral imagination he was able to become concerned for "abstract" people (for example, Germans of later generations, people who were not yet alive, or people outside his reach).

== Artificial imagination ==
As a subcomponent of artificial general intelligence, artificial imagination generates, simulates, and facilitates real or possible fiction models to create predictions, inventions, or conscious experiences. The term also refers to the capability of machines or programs to simulate human activities, including creativity, vision, digital art, humour, and satire.

The research fields of artificial imagination traditionally include (artificial) visual and aural imagination, which extend to all actions involved in forming ideas, images, and concepts—activities linked to imagination. Practitioners are also exploring topics such as artificial visual memory, modeling and filtering content based on human emotions, and interactive search. Additionally, there is interest in how artificial imagination may evolve to create an artificial world comfortable enough for people to use as an escape from reality.

A subfield of artificial imagination that receives rising concern is artificial morals. Artificial intelligence faces challenges regarding the responsibility for machines' mistakes or decisions and the difficulty in creating machines with universally accepted moral rules. Recent research in artificial morals bypasses the strict definition of morality, using machine learning methods to train machines to imitate human morals instead. However, by considering data about moral decisions from thousands of people, the trained moral model may reflect widely accepted rules.

== See also ==
- Creative visualization – Purposeful visualisation for neuropsychological, physiological or social effects
- Creativity – Forming something new and somehow valuable
- Fantasy (psychology) – Mental faculty of drawing imagination and desire in the human brain
- Imagery – Creatives' use of symbolism or figurative language to add depth to their work
- The Imaginary (psychoanalysis) – Term in Lacanian psychoanalysis
- Imaginary (sociology) – Set of common values, laws and symbols
- Imagination Age – Proposed era of humanity after the Information Age
- Imagination inflation – Type of memory distortion
- Sociological imagination – Type of insight offered by the discipline of sociology
- Tulpa – Entity manifesting from mental powers
- Verisimilitude – Resemblance to reality
