= Dream =

Phenomenon of the mind while sleeping

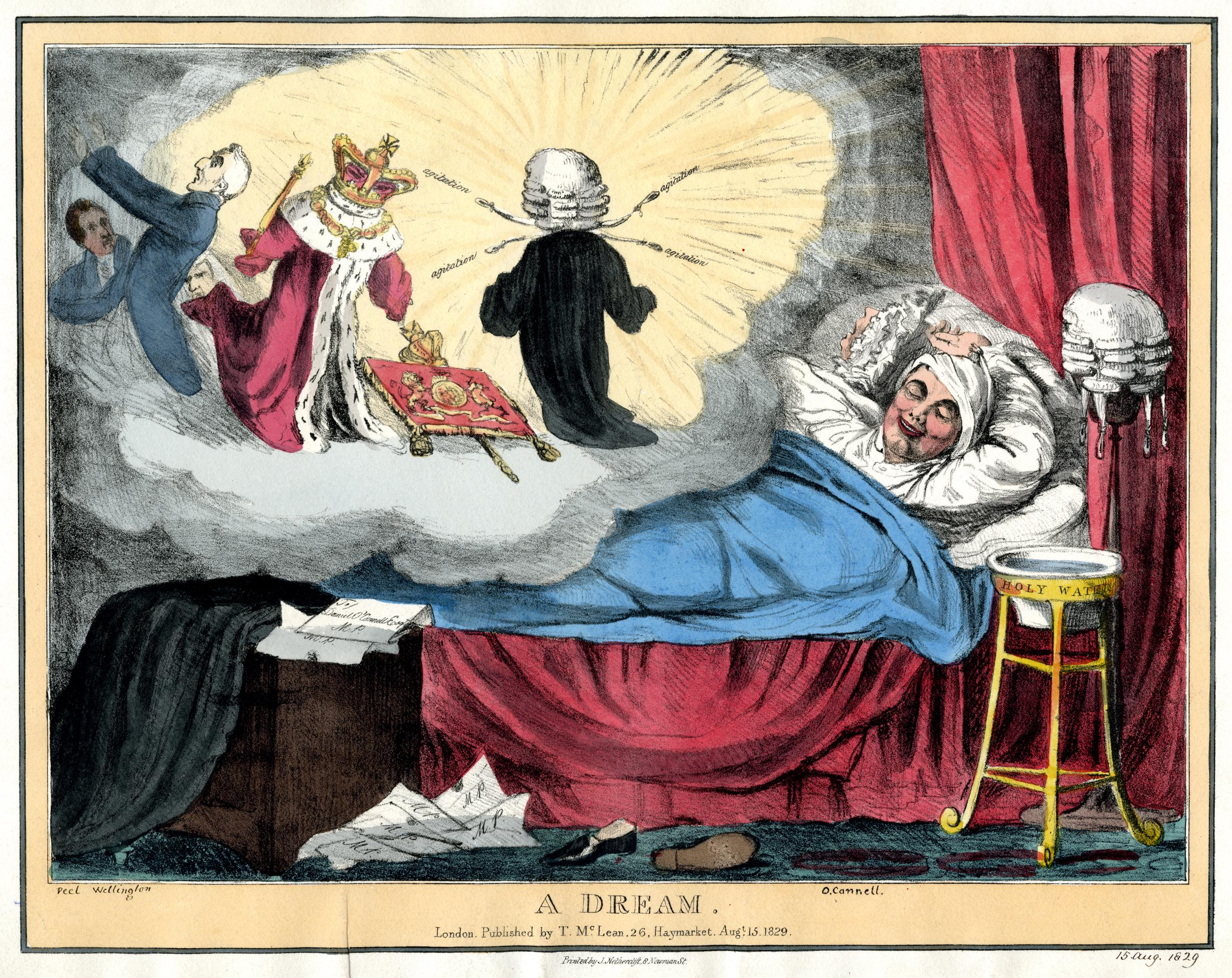
In this illustration, politician Daniel O'Connell dreams of a confrontation between his outfit and that of George IV (r. 1820–1830; shown via a thought bubble)

A dream is a succession of images, dynamic scenes and situations, ideas, emotions, and sensations that usually occur involuntarily in the mind during certain stages of sleep. Humans generally spend more than two hours dreaming per night, and each dream lasts around 5–20 minutes.

The content and function of dreams have been topics of scientific, philosophical and religious interest throughout recorded history. Dream interpretation, practiced by the Babylonians in the third millennium BCE and even earlier by the ancient Sumerians, figures prominently in religious texts in several traditions, and has played a lead role in psychotherapy. Dreamwork is similar, but does not seek to conclude with definite meaning. The scientific study of dreams is called oneirology. Most modern dream study focuses on the neurophysiology of dreams and on proposing and testing hypotheses regarding dream function. It is not known where in the brain dreams originate, if there is a single origin for dreams or if multiple regions of the brain are involved, or what the purpose of dreaming is for the body (or brain or mind).

The human dream experience and what to make of it has undergone sizable shifts over the course of history. Long ago, according to writings from Mesopotamia and Ancient Egypt, dreams dictated post-dream behaviors to an extent that was sharply reduced in later millennia. These ancient writings about dreams highlight visitation dreams, where a dream figure, usually a deity or a prominent forebear, commands the dreamer to take specific actions, and which may predict future events. Framing the dream experience varies across cultures as well as through time.

Dreaming and sleep are intertwined. Dreams occur mainly in the rapid-eye movement (REM) stage of sleep—when brain activity is high and resembles that of being awake. Because REM sleep is detectable in many species, and because research suggests that all mammals experience REM, linking dreams to REM sleep has led to conjectures that animals dream. However, humans also dream during non-REM sleep, and not all REM awakenings elicit dream reports. To be studied, a dream must first be reduced to a verbal report, which is an account of the subject's memory of the dream, not the subject's dream experience itself. Therefore, dreaming by non-humans is currently unprovable, as is dreaming by human fetuses and pre-verbal infants.

== Etymology ==
In Old English, the word drēam was used to describe "noise", "joy", or "music", but not related to the sleep-induced brain activity. It was only in the 13th century that the word dream was used to describe "a series of thoughts, images or emotions occurring during sleep". Etymologists believe that this change was influenced due to the Old Norse draumr, which had the same meaning as the word dream nowadays.

== Subjective experience and content ==
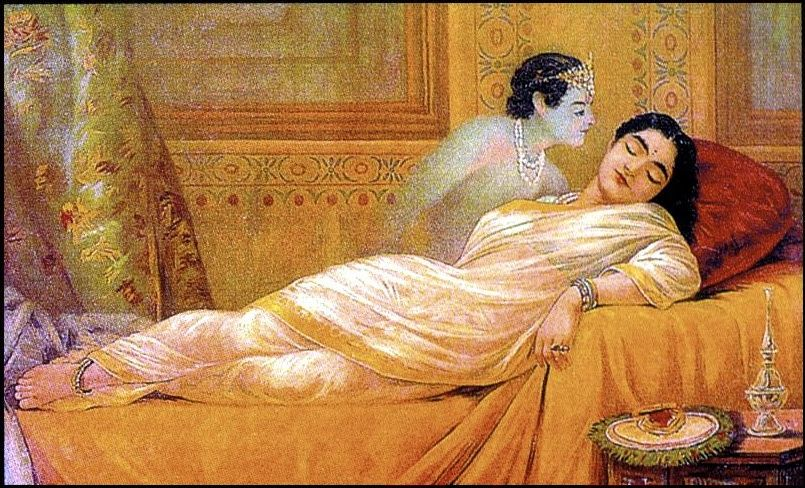
Usha Dreaming Aniruddha (oleographic print) Raja Ravi Varma (1848–1906)

Preserved writings from early Mediterranean civilizations indicate a relatively abrupt change in subjective dream experience between Bronze Age antiquity and the beginnings of the classical era.

In visitation dreams reported in ancient writings, dreamers were largely passive in their dreams, and visual content served primarily to frame authoritative auditory messaging. Gudea, the king of the Sumerian city-state of Lagash (reigned c. 2144–2124 BCE), rebuilt the temple of Ningirsu as the result of a dream in which he was told to do so. After antiquity, the passive hearing of visitation dreams essentially gave way to visualized narratives in which the dreamer becomes a character who actively participates.

From the 1940s to 1985, Calvin S. Hall collected more than 50,000 dream reports at Western Reserve University. In 1966, Hall and Robert Van de Castle published The Content Analysis of Dreams, outlining a coding system to study 1,000 dream reports from college students. Results indicated that participants from varying parts of the world demonstrated similarity in their dream content. The only residue of antiquity's authoritative dream figure in the Hall and Van de Castle listing of dream characters is the inclusion of God in the category of prominent persons. Hall's complete dream reports were made publicly available in the mid-1990s by his protégé William Domhoff. More recent studies of dream reports, while providing more detail, continue to cite the Hall study favorably.

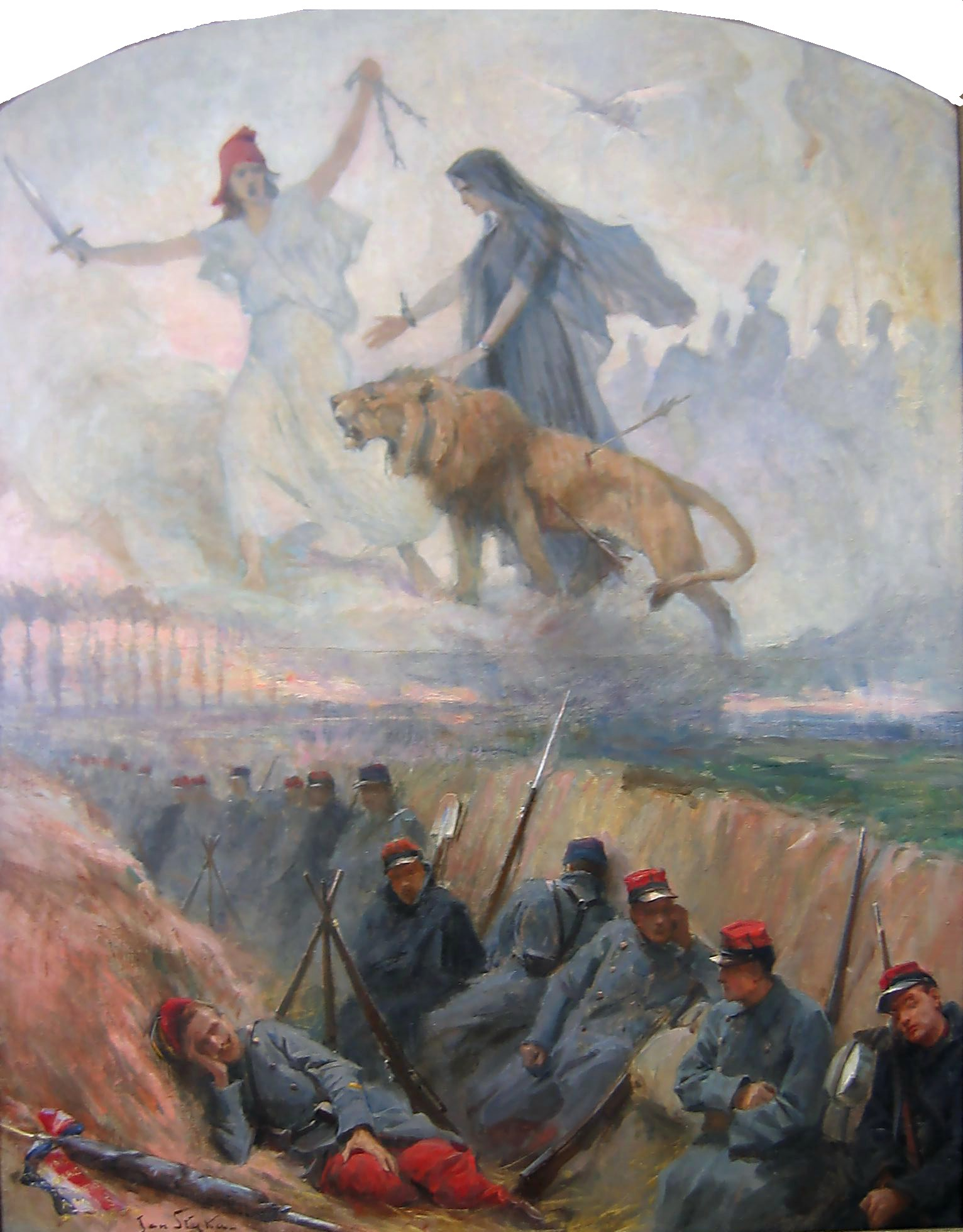
A soldier dreams: the trenches of WWI. Jan Styka (1858–1925).

In the Hall study, the most common emotion experienced in dreams was anxiety. Other emotions included abandonment, anger, fear, joy, and happiness. Negative emotions were much more common than positive ones. The Hall data analysis showed that sexual dreams occur no more than 10% of the time and are more prevalent in young to mid-teens. Another study showed that 8% of both men's and women's dreams have sexual content. In some cases, sexual dreams may result in orgasms or nocturnal emissions. These are colloquially known as "wet dreams".

The visual nature of dreams is generally highly phantasmagoric; that is, different locations and objects continuously blend into each other. The visuals (including locations, people, and objects) are generally reflective of a person's memories and experiences, but conversation can take on highly exaggerated and bizarre forms. Some dreams may even tell elaborate stories wherein the dreamer enters entirely new, complex worlds and awakes with ideas, thoughts, and feelings never experienced before the dream.

People who are blind from birth do not have visual dreams. Their dream contents are related to other senses, such as hearing, touch, smell, and taste, whichever are present since birth.

=== Effects of regional or global catastrophes ===
The COVID-19 pandemic also influenced the content of people's dreams, according to a scientific study of over 15,000 dream reports by Deirdre Barrett. This analysis revealed that themes involving fear, illness, and death were two to four times more prevalent in dreams following the onset of the pandemic than they were before.

== Neurophysiology ==
Dream study is popular with scientists exploring the mind–brain problem. Some "propose to reduce aspects of dream phenomenology to neurobiology." But current science cannot specify dream physiology in detail. Protocols in most nations restrict human brain research to non-invasive procedures. In the United States, invasive brain procedures with a human subject are allowed only when these are deemed necessary in surgical treatment to address medical needs of the same human subject. Non-invasive measures of brain activity like electroencephalogram (EEG) voltage averaging or cerebral blood flow cannot identify small but influential neuronal populations. Also, fMRI signals are too slow to explain how brains compute in real time.

Scientists researching some brain functions can work around current restrictions by examining animal subjects. As stated by the Society for Neuroscience, "Because no adequate alternatives exist, much of this research must [sic] be done on animal subjects." However, since animal dreaming can be only inferred, not confirmed, animal studies yield no hard facts to illuminate the neurophysiology of dreams. Examining human subjects with brain lesions can provide clues, but the lesion method cannot discriminate between the effects of destruction and disconnection and cannot target specific neuronal groups in heterogeneous regions like the brain stem.

== Generation ==
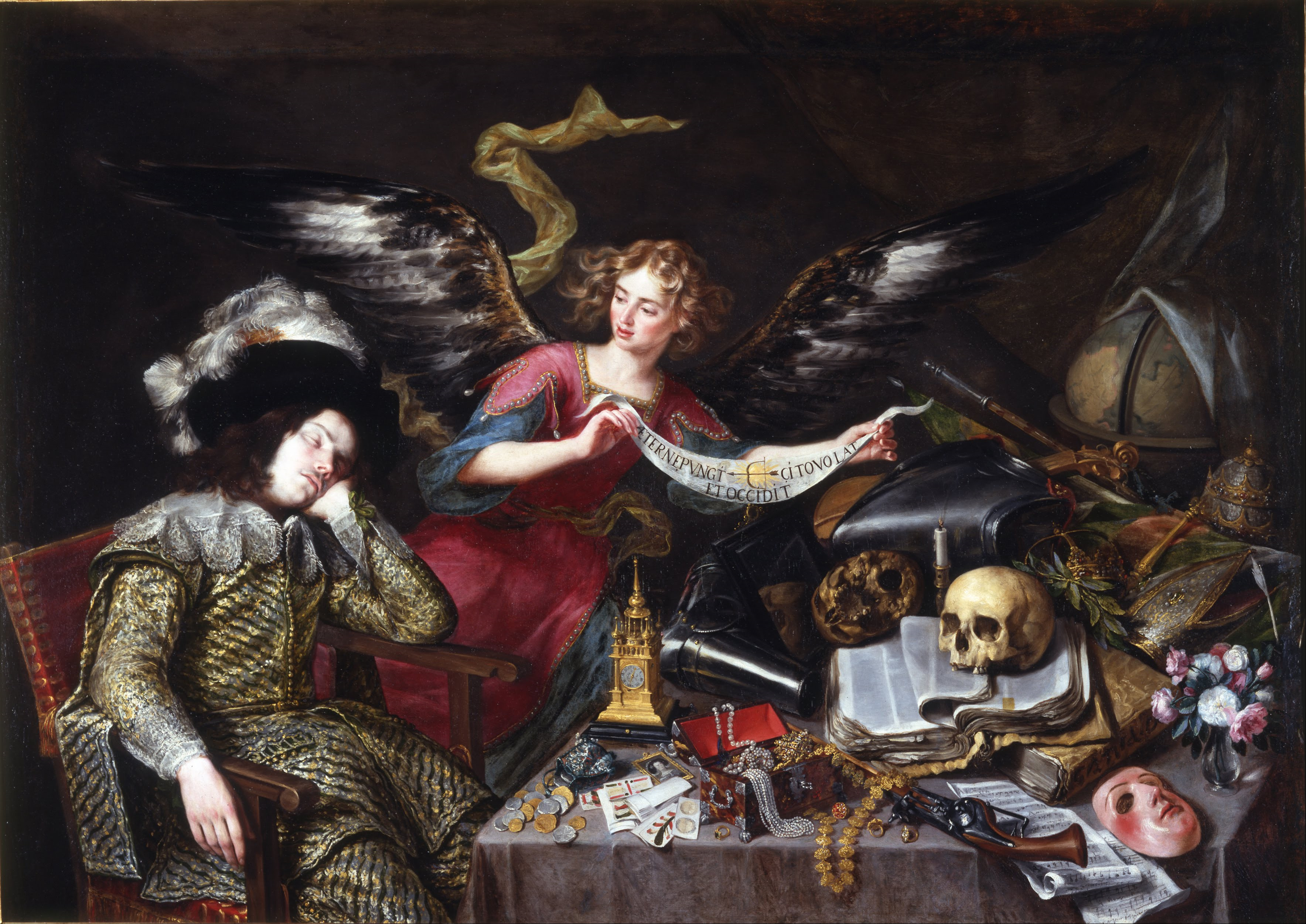
The Knight's Dream, 1655, by Antonio de Pereda

Denied precision tools and obliged to depend on imaging, much dream research has succumbed to the law of the instrument. Studies detect an increase of blood flow in a specific brain region and then credit that region with a role in generating dreams. But pooling study results has led to the newer conclusion that dreaming involves large numbers of regions and pathways, which likely are different for different dream events.

Image creation in the brain involves significant neural activity downstream from eye intake, and it is theorized that "the visual imagery of dreams is produced by activation during sleep of the same structures that generate complex visual imagery in waking perception."

Dreams present a running narrative rather than exclusively visual imagery. Following their work with split-brain subjects, Gazzaniga and LeDoux postulated, without attempting to specify the neural mechanisms, a "left-brain interpreter" that seeks to create a plausible narrative from whatever electro-chemical signals reach the brain's left hemisphere. Sleep research has determined that some brain regions fully active during waking are, during REM sleep, activated only in a partial or fragmentary way. Drawing on this knowledge, textbook author James W. Kalat explains, "[A] dream represents the brain's effort to make sense of sparse and distorted information.... The cortex combines this haphazard input with whatever other activity was already occurring and does its best to synthesize a story that makes sense of the information."

Another framework holds that dreaming is a form of mind-wandering where spontaneous thought is both automatically and weakly constrained by brain networks through a reduction in cognitive control and a reduction in sensory and affective salience. A major neural correlate is the default mode network which are a group of brain regions that are more relatively activated during both mind-wandering and dreaming. Dreams are viewed as embodied simulations of personal concerns.

== Theories on function ==
For many humans across multiple eras and cultures, dreams are believed to have functioned as revealers of truths sourced during sleep from gods or other external entities. Ancient Egyptians believed that dreams were the best way to receive divine revelation, and thus they would induce (or "incubate") dreams. They went to sanctuaries and slept on special "dream beds" in hope of receiving advice, comfort, or healing from the gods. From a Darwinian perspective dreams would have to fulfill some kind of biological requirement, provide some benefit for natural selection to take place, or at least have no negative impact on fitness. Robert (1886), a physician from Hamburg, was the first who suggested that dreams are a need and that they have the function to erase (a) sensory impressions that were not fully worked up, and (b) ideas that were not fully developed during the day. In dreams, incomplete material is either removed (suppressed) or deepened and included into memory. Freud, whose dream studies focused on interpreting dreams, not explaining how or why humans dream, disputed Robert's hypothesis and proposed that dreams preserve sleep by representing as fulfilled those wishes that otherwise would awaken the dreamer. Freud wrote that dreams "serve the purpose of prolonging sleep instead of waking up. Dreams are the GUARDIANS of sleep and not its disturbers."

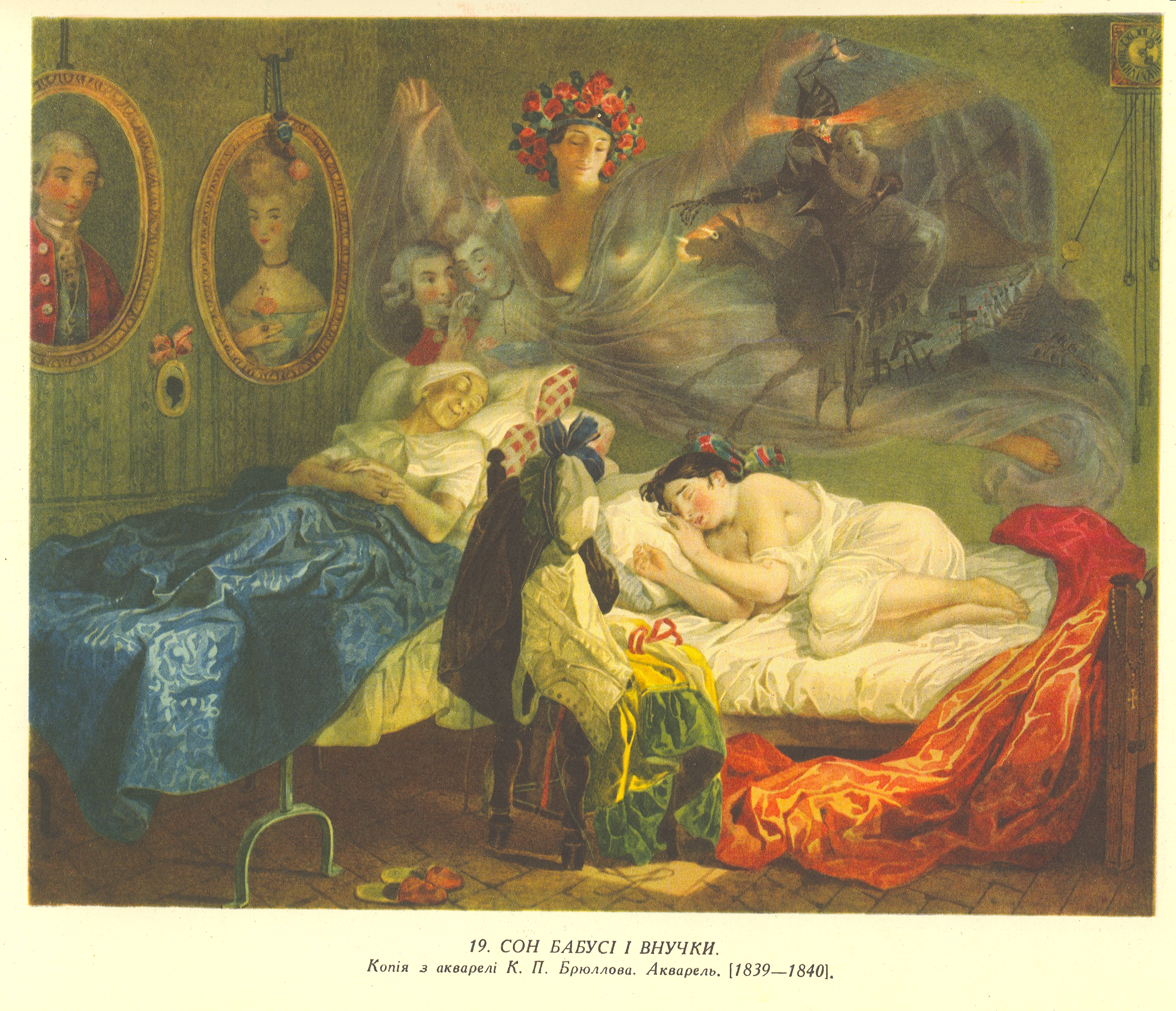
Grandmother and Granddaughter Dream (1839 or 1840). Taras Shevchenko

A turning point in theorizing about dream function came in 1953, when Science published the Aserinsky and Kleitman paper establishing REM sleep as a distinct phase of sleep and linking dreams to REM sleep. Until and even after publication of the Solms 2000 paper that certified the separability of REM sleep and dream phenomena, many studies purporting to uncover the function of dreams have in fact been studying not dreams but measurable REM sleep.

Theories of dream function since the identification of REM sleep include:

Hobson's and McCarley's 1977 activation-synthesis hypothesis, which proposed "a functional role for dreaming sleep in promoting some aspect of the learning process...." In 2010 a Harvard study was published showing experimental evidence that dreams were correlated with improved learning.

Crick's and Mitchison's 1983 "reverse learning" theory, which states that dreams are like the cleaning-up operations of computers when they are offline, removing (suppressing) parasitic nodes and other "junk" from the mind during sleep.

Hartmann's 1995 proposal that dreams serve a "quasi-therapeutic" function, enabling the dreamer to process trauma in a safe place.

Revonsuo's 2000 threat simulation hypothesis, whose premise is that during much of human evolution, physical and interpersonal threats were serious, giving reproductive advantage to those who survived them. Dreaming aided survival by replicating these threats and providing the dreamer with practice in dealing with them. In 2015, Revonsuo proposed social simulation theory, which describes dreams as a simulation for training social skills and bonds.

Domhoff's 2003 neurocognitive model bridges the neuropsychological and phenomenological levels of dream research. The model proposes that dreaming occurs due to the activation of a specific neural network involving the "limbic, paralimbic, and associational areas of the forebrain" which can occur in waking, REM and NREM. The model emphasizes the similarities between waking cognition and dreaming and speculates that dreaming may derive from the capacity for figurative thought. It proposes that dreaming may serve no function but is in fact a byproduct of sleep and consciousness. The model also emphasizes dreaming as a "cognitive achievement" that develops over time in children. In 2015, Domhoff and Fox specified that dreaming is a form of embodied simulation with the major neural correlate being the default mode network, a set of brain regions that are associated with mind-wandering. Secondary sensorimotor and visual cortices also contribute to dreaming. Domhoff states that dreaming focuses on personal concerns and is an "intensified form of mind-wandering and daydreaming". He has critiqued the misinterpretation of the continuity hypothesis by some researchers who believe that it refers to the continuity of specific waking experiences in dreaming, rather than personal concerns.

Eagleman's and Vaughn's 2021 defensive activation theory, which says that, given the brain's neuroplasticity, dreams evolved as a visual hallucinatory activity during sleep's extended periods of darkness, busying the occipital lobe and thereby protecting it from possible appropriation by other, non-vision, sense operations.

Erik Hoel proposes, based on artificial neural networks, that dreams prevent overfitting to past experiences; that is, they enable the dreamer to learn from novel situations. The concept of dreams as learning experiences dates back to the 1970’s when it was observed that the physical body was reacting to dreamed stimuli in a manner analogous to waking behavior. Using electromyography, researchers recorded skeletal and facial nerve impulses that corresponded to dream narratives in a manner representative of learning situations in the behaviorism model of the time. More recently, investigators have demonstrated learning, problem-solving and creativity taking place in both REM and NREM sleep; some have reported subjects learning to solve logic puzzles in dreams.

== Religious and other cultural contexts ==
Dreams figure prominently in major world religions. The dream experience for early humans, according to one interpretation, gave rise to the notion of a human "soul", a central element in much religious thought. J. W. Dunne wrote:

But there can be no reasonable doubt that the idea of a soul must have first arisen in the mind of primitive man as a result of observation of his dreams. Ignorant as he was, he could have come to no other conclusion but that, in dreams, he left his sleeping body in one universe and went wandering off into another. It is considered that, but for that savage, the idea of such a thing as a 'soul' would never have even occurred to mankind....

=== Hindu ===
In the Mandukya Upanishad, part of the Veda scriptures of Indian Hinduism, a dream is one of three states that the soul experiences during its lifetime, the other two states being the waking state and the sleep state. The earliest Upanishads, written before 300 BCE, emphasize two meanings of dreams. The first says that dreams are merely expressions of inner desires. The second is the belief of the soul leaving the body and being guided until awakened.

=== Abrahamic ===
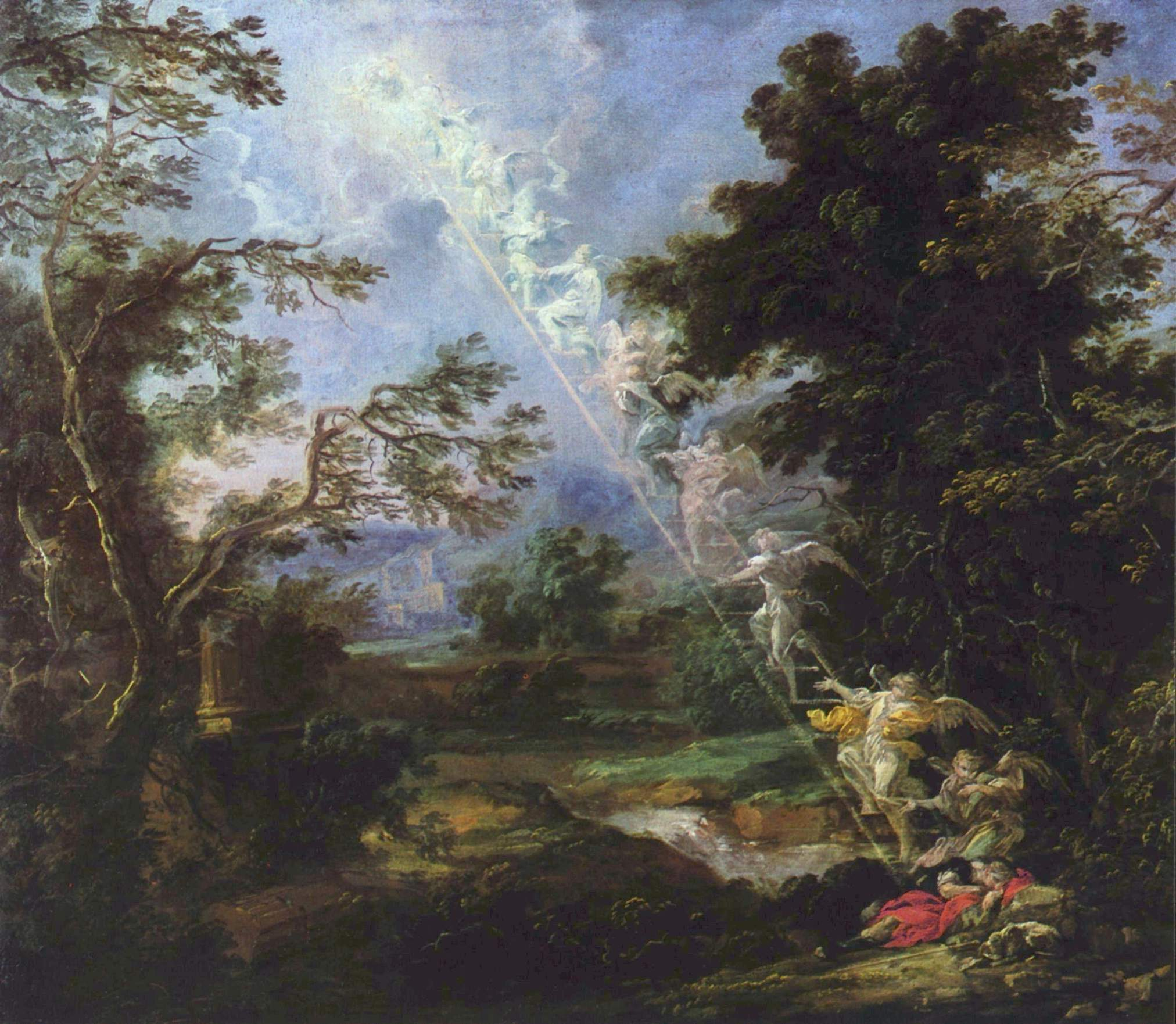
Jacob's dream of a ladder of angels, c. 1690. Michael Willmann

In Judaism, dreams are considered part of the experience of the world that can be interpreted and from which lessons can be garnered. It is discussed in the Talmud, Tractate Berachot 55–60.

The ancient Hebrews connected their dreams heavily with their religion, though the Hebrews were monotheistic and believed that dreams were the voice of one God alone. Hebrews also differentiated between good dreams (from God) and bad dreams (from evil spirits). The Hebrews, like many other ancient cultures, incubated dreams in order to receive a divine revelation. For example, the Hebrew prophet Samuel would "lie down and sleep in the temple at Shiloh before the Ark and receive the word of the Lord", and Joseph interpreted a Pharaoh's dream of seven lean cows swallowing seven fat cows as meaning the subsequent seven years would be bountiful, followed by seven years of famine. Most of the dreams in the Bible are in the Book of Genesis.

Christians mostly shared the beliefs of the Hebrews and thought that dreams were of a supernatural character because the Old Testament includes frequent stories of dreams with divine inspiration. The most famous of these dream stories was Jacob's dream of a ladder that stretches from Earth to Heaven. Many Christians preach that God can speak to people through their dreams. The famous glossary, the Somniale Danielis, written in the name of Daniel, attempted to teach Christian populations to interpret their dreams.

Iain R. Edgar has researched the role of dreams in Islam. He has argued that dreams play an important role in the history of Islam and the lives of Muslims, since dream interpretation is the only way that Muslims can receive revelations from God since the death of the last prophet, Muhammad. According to Edgar, Islam classifies three types of dreams. Firstly, there is the true dream (al-ru'ya), then the false dream, which may come from the devil (shaytan), and finally, the meaningless everyday dream (hulm). This last dream could be brought forth by the dreamer's ego or base appetite based on what they experienced in the real world. The true dream is often indicated by Islam's hadith tradition. In one narration by Aisha, the wife of the Prophet, it is said that the Prophet's dreams would come true like the ocean's waves. Just as in its predecessors, the Quran also recounts the story of Joseph and his unique ability to interpret dreams.

In both Christianity and Islam dreams feature in conversion stories. According to ancient authors, Constantine the Great started his conversion to Christianity because he had a dream which prophesied that he would win the battle of the Milvian Bridge if he adopted the Chi-Rho as his battle standard."

The Catholic Church provided the death penalty for interpreting dreams. That is according to the prohibition from the Old Testament. Neither the Catholic Church, nor the Old Testament were coherent about it.

=== Buddhist ===
In Buddhism, ideas about dreams are similar to the classical and folk traditions in South Asia. The same dream is sometimes experienced by multiple people, as in the case of the Buddha-to-be, before he is leaving his home. It is described in the Mahāvastu that several of the Buddha's relatives had premonitory dreams preceding this. Some dreams are also seen to transcend time: the Buddha-to-be has certain dreams that are the same as those of previous Buddhas, the Lalitavistara states. In Buddhist literature, dreams often function as a "signpost" motif to mark certain stages in the life of the main character.

Buddhist views about dreams are expressed in the Pāli Commentaries and the Milinda Pañhā.

=== Other ===
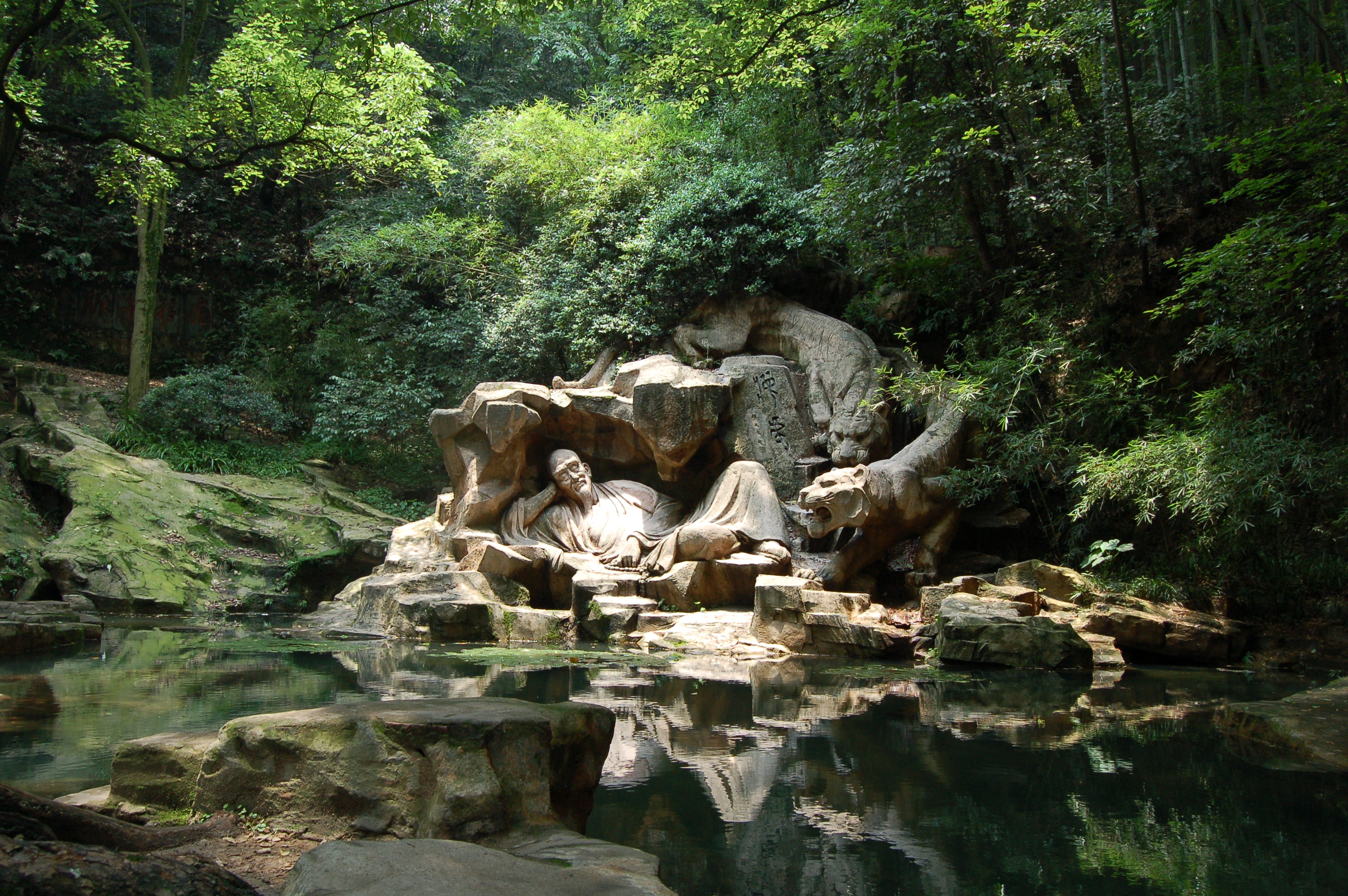
Dreaming of the Tiger Spring (虎跑夢泉) Statue at Hupao Spring (Hupaomengquan) in Hangzhou, Zhejiang, China

In Chinese history, people wrote of two vital aspects of the soul of which one is freed from the body during slumber to journey in a dream realm, while the other remained in the body. This belief and dream interpretation had been questioned since early times, such as by the philosopher Wang Chong (27–97 CE).

The Babylonians and Assyrians divided dreams into "good," which were sent by the gods, and "bad," sent by demons. A surviving collection of dream omens entitled Iškar Zaqīqu records various dream scenarios as well as prognostications of what will happen to the person who experiences each dream, apparently based on previous cases. Some list different possible outcomes, based on occasions in which people experienced similar dreams with different results. The Greeks shared their beliefs with the Egyptians on how to interpret good and bad dreams, and the idea of incubating dreams. Morpheus, the Greek god of dreams, also sent warnings and prophecies to those who slept at shrines and temples. The earliest Greek beliefs about dreams were that their gods physically visited the dreamers, where they entered through a keyhole, exiting the same way after the divine message was given.

Antiphon wrote the first known Greek book on dreams in the 5th century BCE. In that century, other cultures influenced Greeks to develop the belief that souls left the sleeping body. The father of modern medicine, Hippocrates (460–375 BCE), thought dreams could analyze illness and predict diseases. For instance, a dream of a dim star high in the night sky indicated problems in the head region, while low in the night sky indicated bowel issues. Galen (129–216 AD) believed the same thing. Greek philosopher Plato (427–347 BCE) wrote that people harbor secret, repressed desires, such as incest, murder, adultery, and conquest, which build up during the day and run rampant during the night in dreams. Plato's student, Aristotle (384–322 BCE), believed dreams were caused by processing incomplete physiological activity during sleep, such as eyes trying to see while the sleeper's eyelids were closed. Marcus Tullius Cicero, for his part, believed that all dreams are produced by thoughts and conversations a dreamer had during the preceding days. Cicero's Somnium Scipionis described a lengthy dream vision, which in turn was commented on by Macrobius in his Commentarii in Somnium Scipionis.

Herodotus in his The Histories, writes "The visions that occur to us in dreams are, more often than not, the things we have been concerned about during the day."

The Dreaming is a common term within the animist creation narrative of indigenous Australians for a personal, or group, creation and for what may be understood as the "timeless time" of formative creation and perpetual creating.

Some Indigenous American tribes and Mexican populations believe that dreams are a way of visiting and having contact with their ancestors. Some Native American tribes have used vision quests as a rite of passage, fasting and praying until an anticipated guiding dream was received, to be shared with the rest of the tribe upon their return.

== Interpretation ==
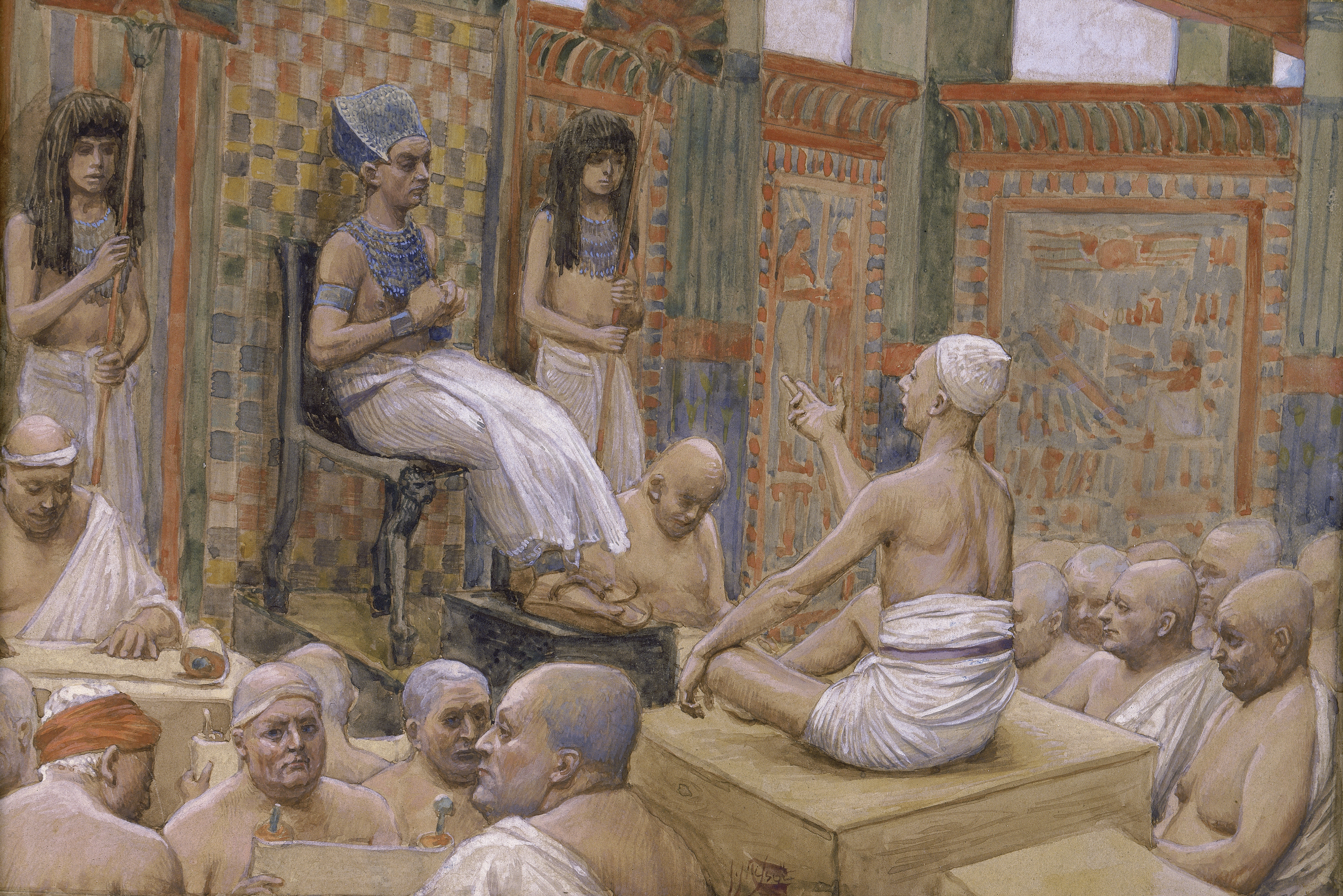
Joseph Interprets Pharaoh's Dream c. 1896–1902. Jacques Joseph Tissot (1836–1902).

Beginning in the late 19th century, Austrian neurologist Sigmund Freud, founder of psychoanalysis, theorized that dreams reflect the dreamer's unconscious mind and specifically that dream content is shaped by unconscious wish fulfillment. He argued that important unconscious desires often relate to early childhood memories and experiences. Carl Jung and others expanded on Freud's idea that dream content reflects the dreamer's unconscious desires.

Dream interpretation can be a result of subjective ideas and experiences. One study found that most people believe that "their dreams reveal meaningful hidden truths". The researchers surveyed students in the United States, South Korea, and India, and found that 74% of Indians, 65% of South Koreans and 56% of Americans believed their dream content provided them with meaningful insight into their unconscious beliefs and desires. This Freudian view of dreaming was believed significantly more than theories of dreaming that attribute dream content to memory consolidation, problem-solving, or as a byproduct of unrelated brain activity. The same study found that people attribute more importance to dream content than to similar thought content that occurs while they are awake. Americans were more likely to report that they would intentionally miss their flight if they dreamt of their plane crashing than if they thought of their plane crashing the night before flying (while awake), and that they would be as likely to miss their flight if they dreamt of their plane crashing the night before their flight as if there was an actual plane crash on the route they intended to take. Participants in the study were more likely to perceive dreams to be meaningful when the content of dreams was in accordance with their beliefs and desires while awake. They were more likely to view a positive dream about a friend to be meaningful than a positive dream about someone they disliked, for example, and were more likely to view a negative dream about a person they disliked as meaningful than a negative dream about a person they liked.

According to surveys, it is common for people to feel their dreams are predicting subsequent life events. Psychologists have explained these experiences in terms of memory biases, namely a selective memory for accurate predictions and distorted memory so that dreams are retrospectively fitted onto life experiences. The multi-faceted nature of dreams makes it easy to find connections between dream content and real events. The term "veridical dream" has been used to indicate dreams that reveal or contain truths not yet known to the dreamer, whether future events or secrets.

In one experiment, subjects were asked to write down their dreams in a diary. This prevented the selective memory effect, and the dreams no longer seemed accurate about the future. Another experiment gave subjects a fake diary of a student with apparently precognitive dreams. This diary described events from the person's life, as well as some predictive dreams and some non-predictive dreams. When subjects were asked to recall the dreams they had read, they remembered more of the successful predictions than unsuccessful ones.

== Images and literature ==
Graphic artists, writers and filmmakers all have found dreams to offer a rich vein for creative expression. In the West, artists' depictions of dreams in Renaissance and Baroque art often were related to Biblical narrative. Especially preferred by visual artists were the Jacob's Ladder dream in Genesis and St. Joseph's dreams in the Gospel according to Matthew.

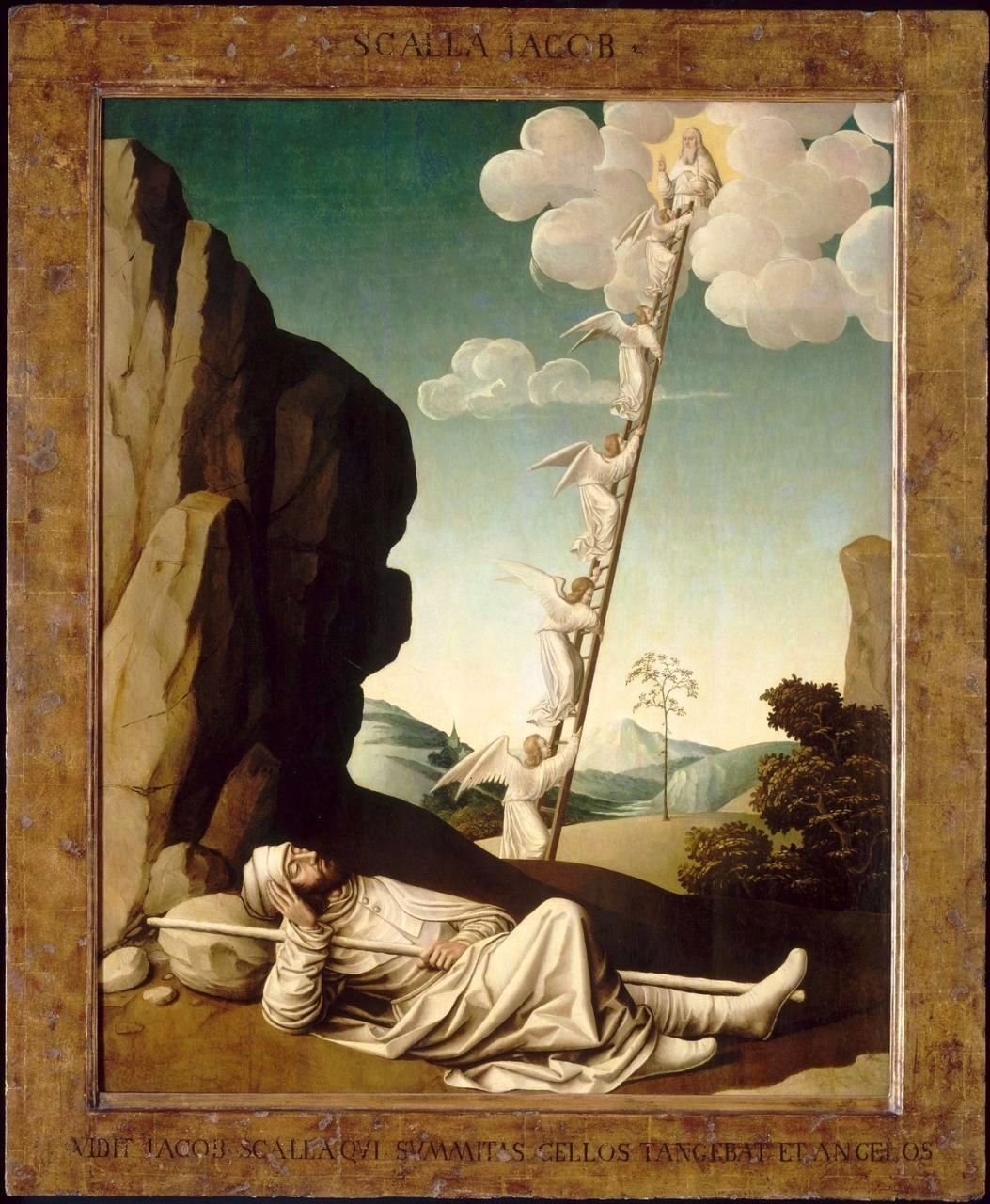
Nicolas Dipre. Le songe de Jacob. c. 1500 Avignon, Petit Palais.

José de Ribera (1591–1652). El sueño de Jacob, from Prado in Google Earth

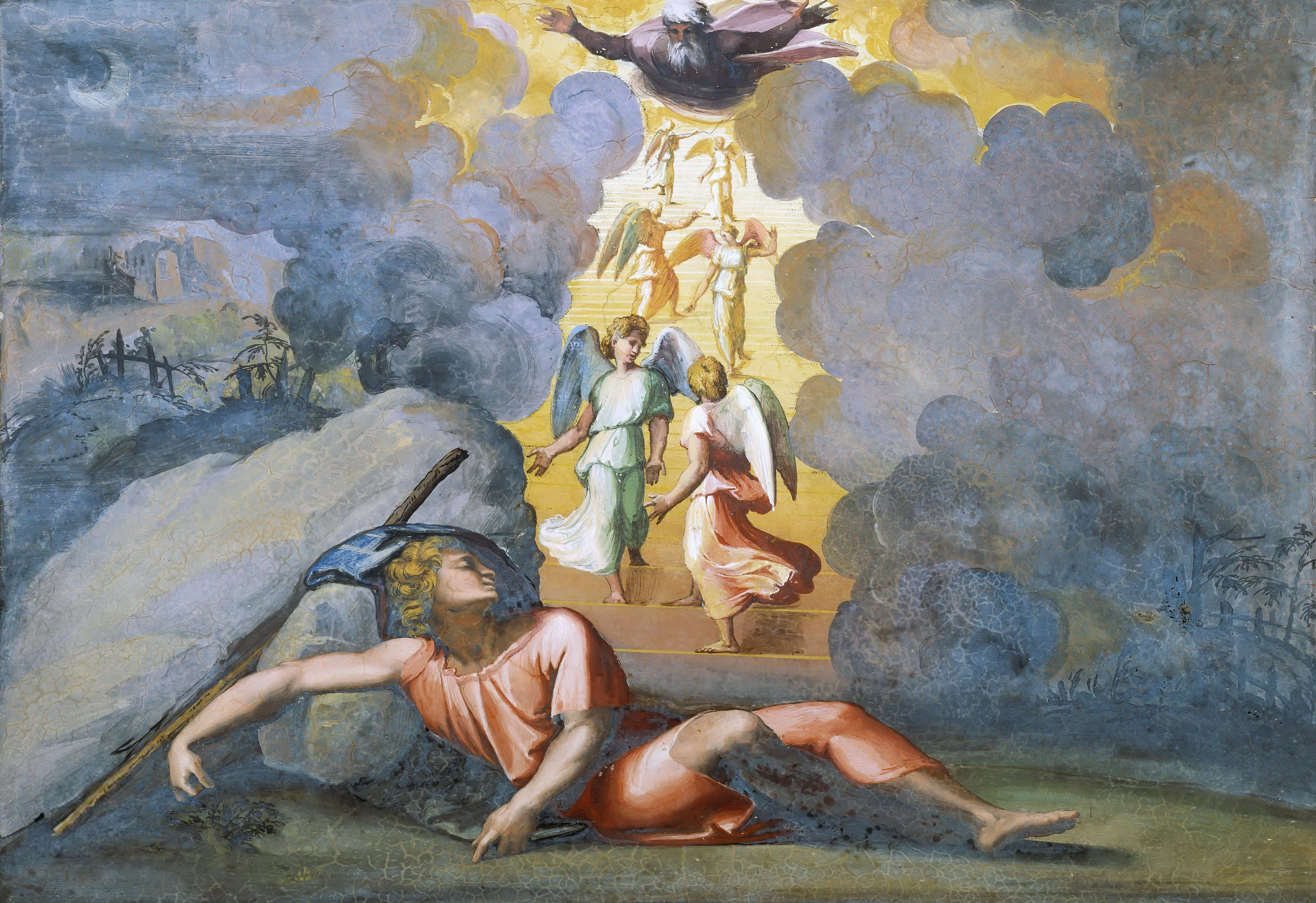
Raphael. Jacob's Dream (1518)

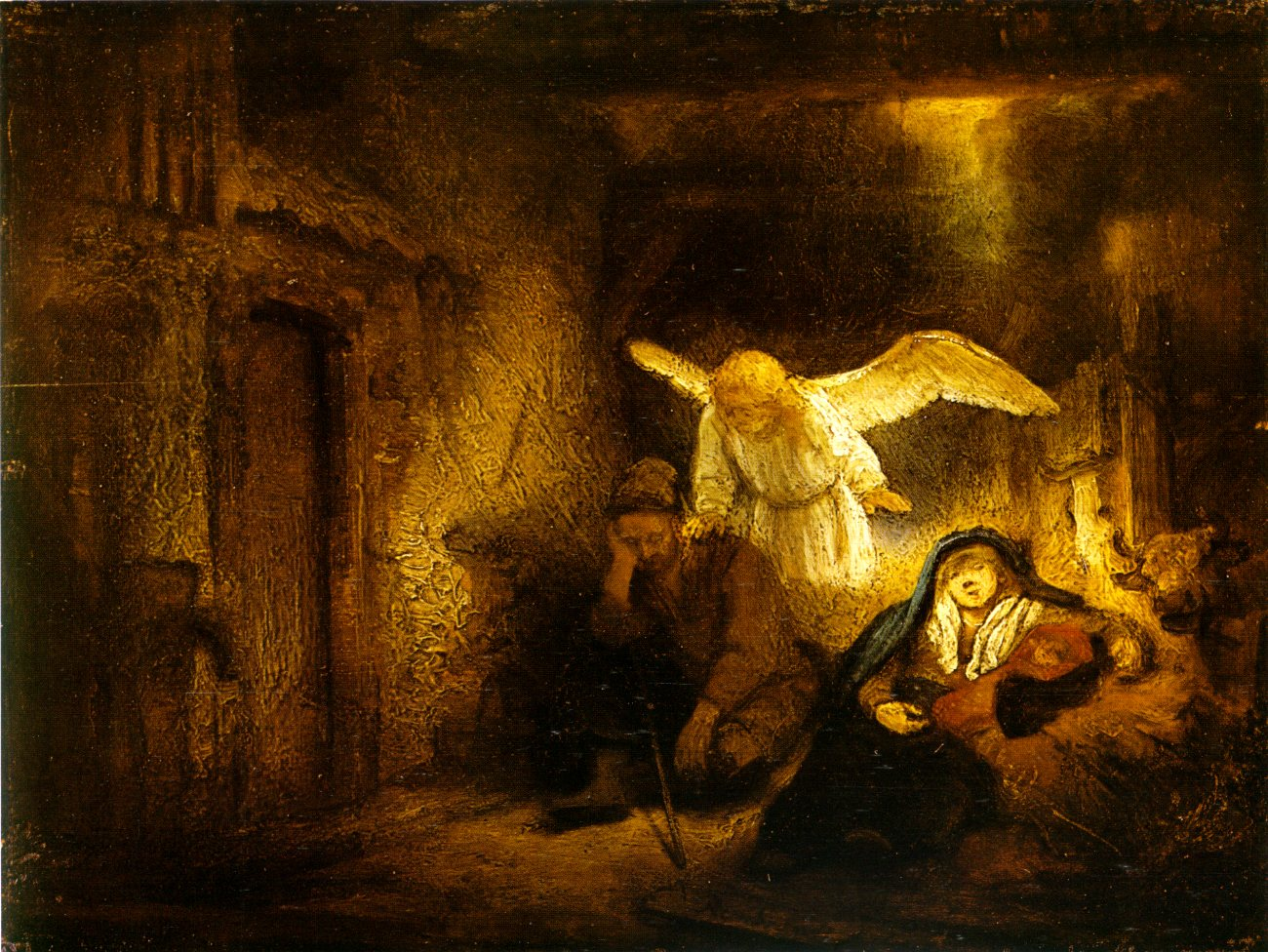
Rembrandt. Dream of Joseph (1645)

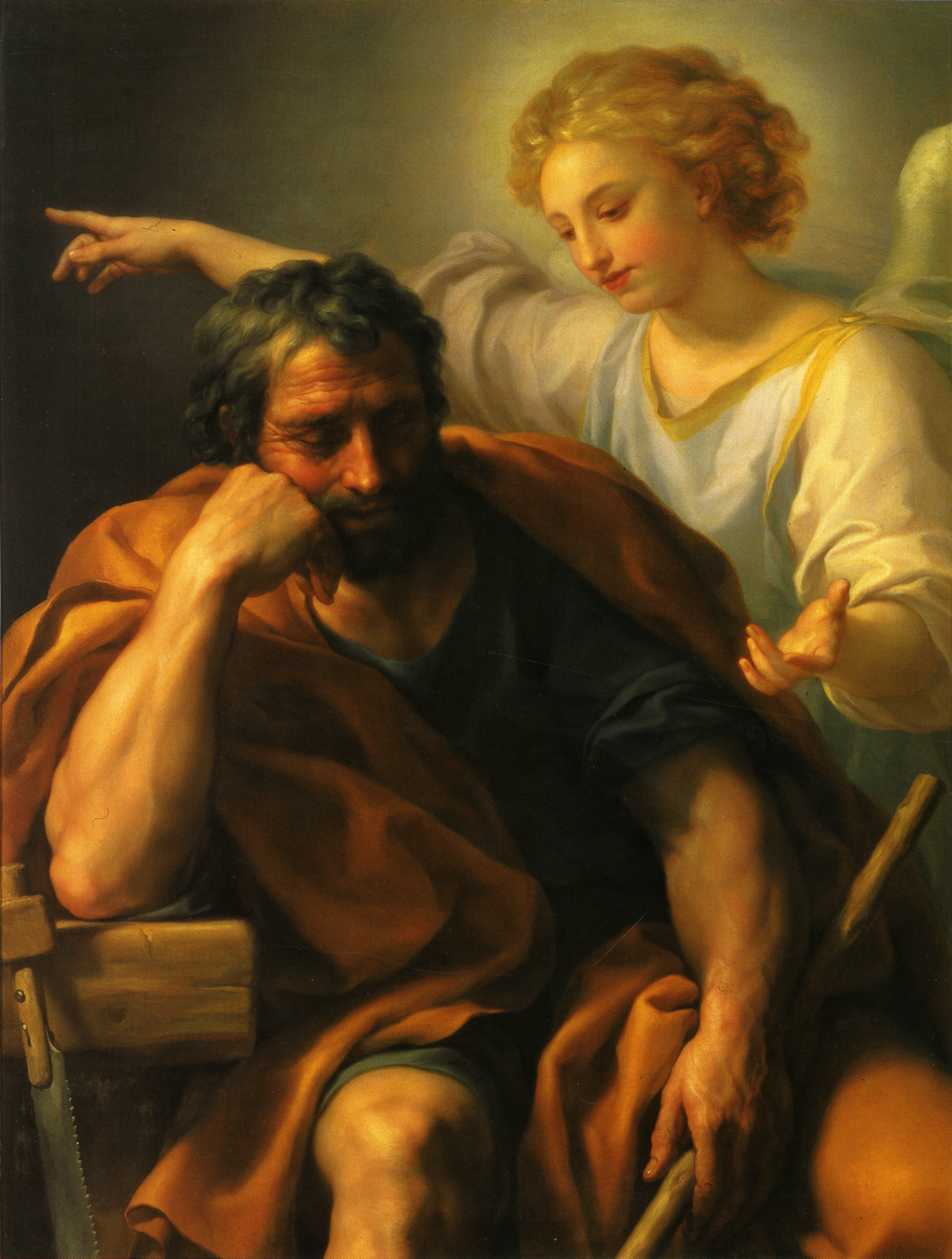
Anton Raphael Mengs. Traum des Hl. Joseph (1773 or 1774)

Many later graphic artists have depicted dreams, including Japanese woodblock artist Hokusai (1760–1849) and Western European painters Rousseau (1844–1910), Picasso (1881–1973), and Dalí (1904–1989).

In literature, dream frames were frequently used in medieval allegory to justify the narrative; The Book of the Duchess and The Vision Concerning Piers Plowman are two such dream visions. Even before them, in antiquity, the same device had been used by Cicero and Lucian of Samosata.

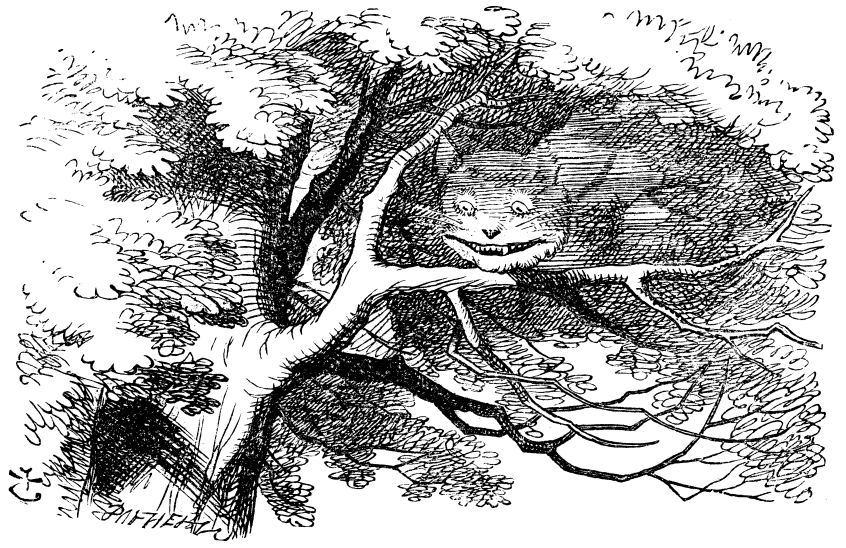
The cheshire cat, John Tenniel (1820–1914), illustration in Alice's Adventures in Wonderland, 1866 edition

Dreams have also featured in fantasy and speculative fiction since the 19th century. One of the best-known dream worlds is Wonderland from Lewis Carroll's Alice's Adventures in Wonderland, as well as Looking-Glass Land from its sequel, Through the Looking-Glass. Unlike many dream worlds, Carroll's logic is like that of actual dreams, with transitions and flexible causality.

In the Eastern world, Water Margin emerges as the first major Chinese novel that consciously uses extensive dream episodes as a literary and aesthetic device, which indirectly influences the writing of A Supplement to the Journey to the West and Dream of the Red Chamber.

Other fictional dream worlds include the Dreamlands of H. P. Lovecraft's Dream Cycle and The Neverending Story's world of Fantastica, which includes places like the Desert of Lost Dreams, the Sea of Possibilities and the Swamps of Sadness. Dreamworlds, shared hallucinations and other alternate realities feature in a number of works by Philip K. Dick, such as The Three Stigmata of Palmer Eldritch and Ubik. Similar themes were explored by Jorge Luis Borges, for instance in The Circular Ruins.

Modern popular culture often conceives of dreams, as did Freud, as expressions of the dreamer's deepest fears and desires. In speculative fiction, the line between dreams and reality may be blurred even more in service to the story. Dreams may be psychically invaded or manipulated (Dreamscape, 1984; the Nightmare on Elm Street films, 1984–2010; Inception, 2010) or even come literally true (as in The Lathe of Heaven, 1971).

== Lucidity ==
Lucid dreaming is the conscious perception of one's state while dreaming. In this state the dreamer may often have some degree of control over their own actions within the dream or even the characters and the environment of the dream. Dream control has been reported to improve with practiced deliberate lucid dreaming, but the ability to control aspects of the dream is not necessary for a dream to qualify as "lucid"—a lucid dream is any dream during which the dreamer knows they are dreaming. The occurrence of lucid dreaming has been scientifically verified.

"Oneironaut" is a term sometimes used for those who lucidly dream.

In 1975, psychologist Keith Hearne successfully recorded a communication from a dreamer experiencing a lucid dream. On April 12, 1975, after agreeing to move his eyes left and right upon becoming lucid, the subject and Hearne's co-author on the resulting article, Alan Worsley, successfully carried out this task. Years later, psychophysiologist Stephen LaBerge conducted similar work including:

- Using eye signals to map the subjective sense of time in dreams.
- Comparing the electrical activity of the brain while singing awake and while dreaming.
- Studies comparing in-dream sex, arousal, and orgasm.

Communication between two dreamers has also been documented. The processes involved included EEG monitoring, ocular signaling, incorporation of reality in the form of red light stimuli and a coordinating website. The website tracked when both dreamers were dreaming and sent the stimulus to one of the dreamers where it was incorporated into the dream. This dreamer, upon becoming lucid, signaled with eye movements; this was detected by the website whereupon the stimulus was sent to the second dreamer, invoking incorporation into that dreamer's dream.

== Recollection ==
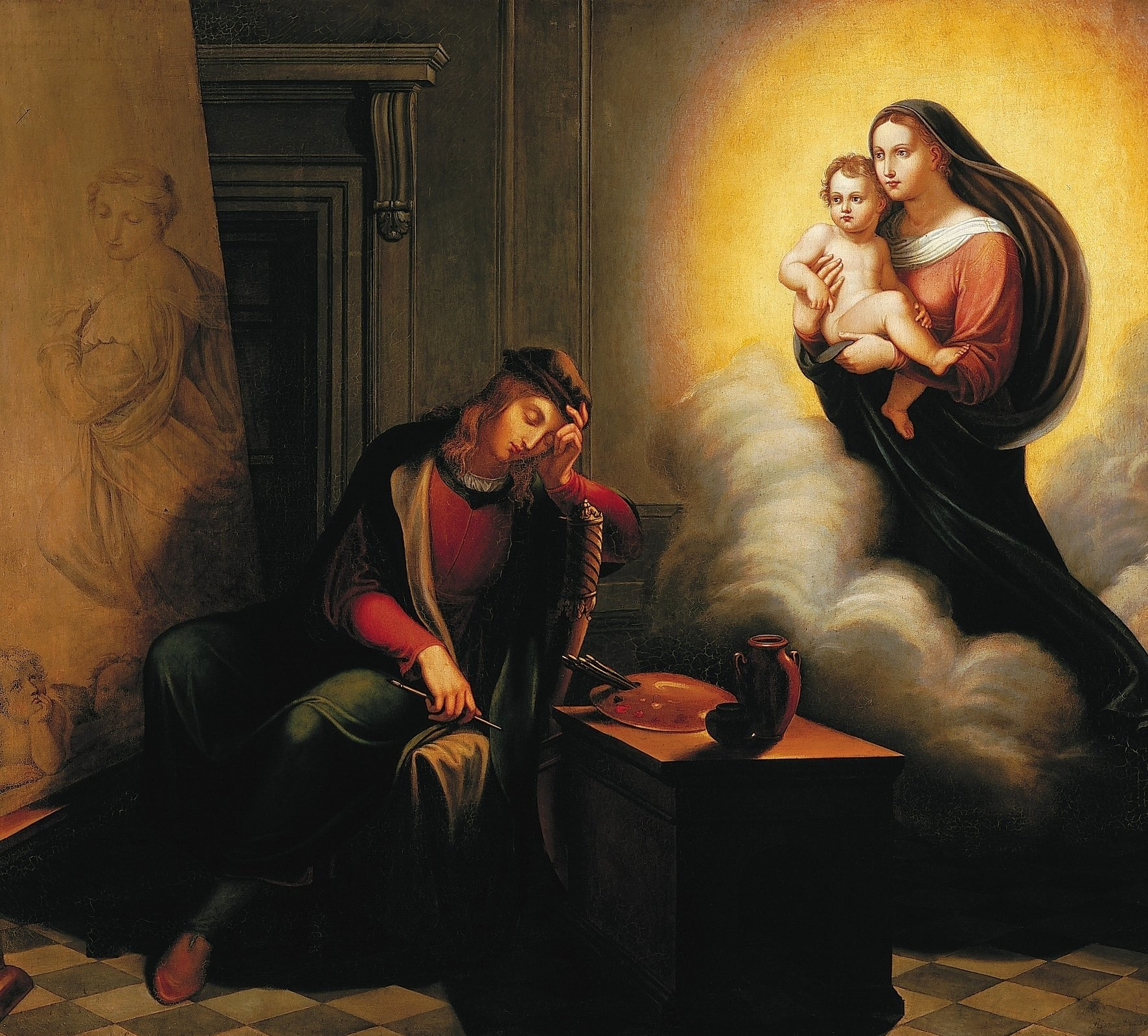
Raphael's dream (1821). Johannes Riepenhausen and Franz Riepenhausen.

The recollection of dreams is extremely unreliable, though it is a skill that can be trained. Dreams can usually be recalled if a person is awakened while dreaming. Women tend to have more frequent dream recall than men. Dreams that are difficult to recall may be characterized by relatively little affect, and factors such as salience, arousal, and interference play a role in dream recall. Often, a dream may be recalled upon viewing or hearing a random trigger or stimulus. The salience hypothesis proposes that dream content that is salient, that is, novel, intense, or unusual, is more easily remembered. There is considerable evidence that vivid, intense, or unusual dream content is more frequently recalled. A dream journal can be used to assist dream recall, for personal interest or psychotherapy purposes.

Adults report remembering around two dreams per week, on average. Unless a dream is particularly vivid and if one wakes during or immediately after it, the content of the dream is typically not remembered.

In line with the salience hypothesis, there is considerable evidence that people who have more vivid, intense or unusual dreams show better recall. There is evidence that continuity of consciousness is related to recall. Specifically, people who have vivid and unusual experiences during the day tend to have more memorable dream content and hence better dream recall. People who score high on measures of personality traits associated with creativity, imagination, and fantasy, such as openness to experience, daydreaming, fantasy proneness, absorption, and hypnotic susceptibility, tend to show more frequent dream recall. There is also evidence for continuity between the bizarre aspects of dreaming and waking experience. That is, people who report more bizarre experiences during the day, such as people high in schizotypy (psychosis proneness), have more frequent dream recall and also report more frequent nightmares.

=== Dream-recording machine ===
Recording or reconstructing dreams may one day assist with dream recall. Using the permitted non-invasive technologies, functional magnetic resonance imaging (fMRI) and electromyography (EMG), researchers have been able to identify and reconstruct basic dream imagery, dream speech activity and dream motor behavior (such as walking and hand movements).

== Developmental psychology ==
Dreams as a developmental psychology derive from research by psychologists such as Jean Piaget and David Foulkes.

Jean Piaget considered children's dreams as a reflection of their developing cognitive and symbolic reasoning. He detailed three distinct stages in how children conceptualize dreams: Stage 1 (Ages 5–6): Children believe dreams come from the outside world and occur externally in their room or in front of their faces. They often view dreams as literal, physical events that other people could see. Stage 2 (Ages 7–8): Children begin to realize that dreams originate inside them, but they still view the dream as something that physically happens outside of their body (like a film playing in the air).Stage 3 (Ages 8–9): Children fully understand that dreams are internal experiences, originating in their own minds and consisting of their own thoughts and feelings.

David Foulkes theorized that dreaming as we generally understand it—active stories in which the dreamer is an actor—appears relatively late in childhood. This narrative dreaming begins between the ages of 7 and 9. Laboratory studies show that preschoolers' REM sleep dreams usually consist of isolated static images—often of animals. Foulkes argued that the late development of narrative dreaming suggests an equally late development of waking reflective self-awareness.

== Miscellany ==
=== Illusion of reality ===
Some philosophers have proposed that what we think of as the "real world" could be or is an illusion (an idea known as the skeptical hypothesis about ontology). The first recorded mention of the idea was in the 4th century BCE by Zhuangzi, and in Eastern philosophy, the problem has been named the "Zhuangzi Paradox."

He who dreams of drinking wine may weep when morning comes; he who dreams of weeping may in the morning go off to hunt. While he is dreaming he does not know it is a dream, and in his dream he may even try to interpret a dream. Only after he wakes does he know it was a dream. And someday there will be a great awakening when we know that this is all a great dream. Yet the stupid believe they are awake, busily and brightly assuming they understand things, calling this man ruler, that one herdsman—how dense! Confucius and you are both dreaming! And when I say you are dreaming, I am dreaming, too. Words like these will be labeled the Supreme Swindle. Yet, after ten thousand generations, a great sage may appear who will know their meaning, and it will still be as though he appeared with astonishing speed.

The idea also is discussed in Hindu and Buddhist writings. It was formally introduced to Western philosophy by Descartes in the 17th century in his Meditations on First Philosophy.

=== Absent-minded transgression ===
Dreams of absent-minded transgression (DAMT) are dreams wherein the dreamer absent-mindedly performs an action that he or she has been trying to stop (one classic example is of a quitting smoker having dreams of lighting a cigarette). Subjects who have had DAMT have reported waking with intense feelings of guilt. One study found a positive association between having these dreams and successfully stopping the behavior.

=== Non-REM dreams ===
Hypnogogic and hypnopompic dreams, dreamlike states shortly after falling asleep and shortly before awakening, and dreams during stage 2 of NREM-sleep, also occur, but are shorter than REM-dreams. In one study, it was found that approximately 70 percent of participants who were woken up during NREM-sleep reported having dreams, with about half of those respondents being able to recall those dreams.

=== Time and space ===
There is a long anecdotal history of time in dreams. In the movie Inception, time passes much slower in deeper dream layers. As the characters descend further into the subconscious, dream time dilates, making minutes in the real world feel like days or even decades within the dream. In the legendary "Water Drop" dream from the writings of French philosopher Maurice Maeterlinck, the writer dreamed he lived through an entire lifetime of experiences, waking up to the sensation of a single drop of water on his neck. His dream, which felt like it lasted for years, occurred in the few moments between the falling droplet and his awakening.

Objective measurements of dream-time duration are relatively recent. Scientific studies of lucid dreamers show that for simple cognitive tasks like counting seconds, the subjective experience of dream duration closely matches real-world time. However, motor activities (like doing squats or walking) actually take about 30% to 50% longer to complete in dreams compared to the waking state.

The experience of space in dreams has been explored by psychologists. The spatial dimensions of dreams frequently signify important emotional themes of the dream. In doing so, they serve to reflect processes of self-recognition in relation to the environment, processes that began in early childhood when the developing child's experience of movement through space played a central role in an emerging sense of the self.

Subjective time and space may often relate reciprocally (slowed time/shortened space) in dreams so as to fulfill the mundane expectations of the dreamer.

=== Daydreams ===
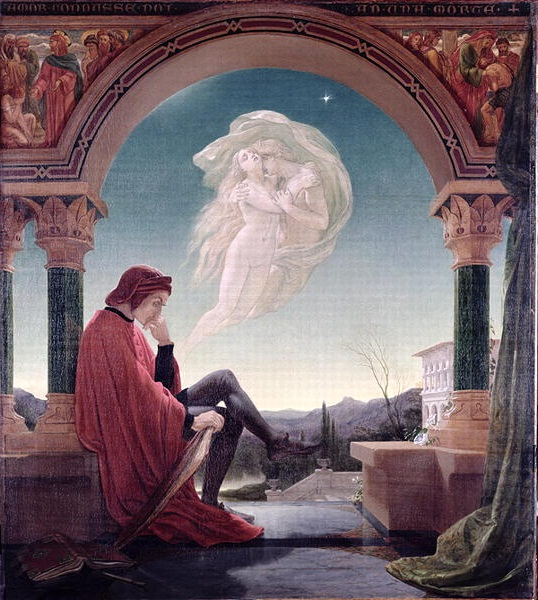
Dante Meditating, 1852, by Joseph Noel Paton

A daydream is a visionary fantasy, especially one of happy, pleasant thoughts, hopes or ambitions, imagined as coming to pass, and experienced while awake. There are many different types of daydreams, and there is no consistent definition amongst psychologists. The general public also uses the term for a broad variety of experiences. Research by Harvard psychologist Deirdre Barrett has found that people who experience vivid dreamlike mental images reserve the word for these, whereas many other people refer to milder imagery, realistic future planning, review of memories or just "spacing out"—i.e. one's mind going relatively blank—when they talk about "daydreaming".

While daydreaming has long been derided as a lazy, non-productive pastime, it is now commonly acknowledged that daydreaming can be constructive in some contexts. There are numerous examples of people in creative or artistic careers, such as composers, novelists and filmmakers, developing new ideas through daydreaming. Similarly, research scientists, mathematicians and physicists have developed new ideas by daydreaming about their subject areas.

=== Hallucination ===
A hallucination, in the broadest sense of the word, is a perception in the absence of a stimulus. In a stricter sense, hallucinations are perceptions in a conscious and awake state, in the absence of external stimuli, and have qualities of real perception, in that they are vivid, substantial, and located in external objective space. The latter definition distinguishes hallucinations from the related phenomena of dreaming, which does not involve wakefulness.

=== Nightmare ===
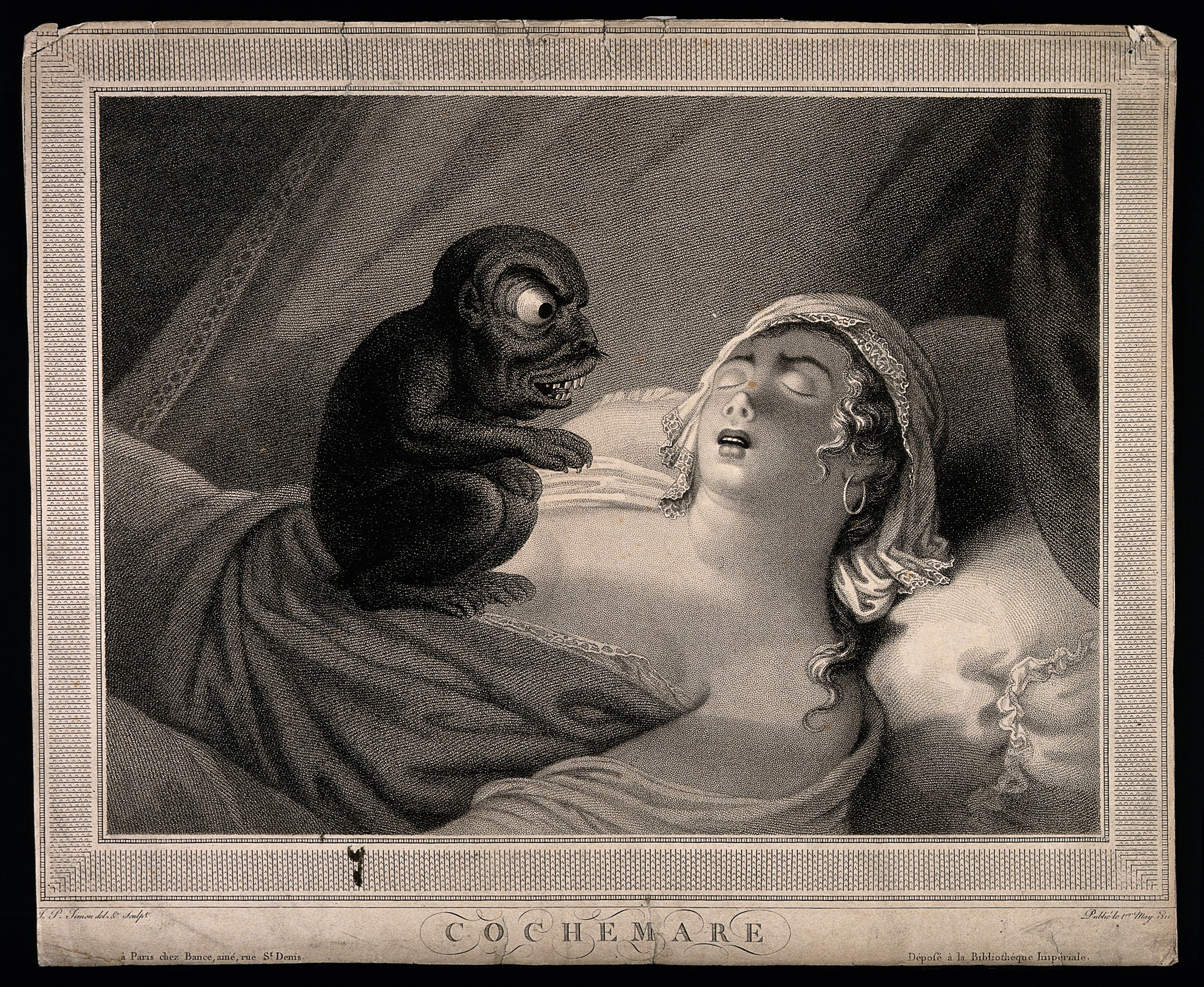
Woman having a nightmare. Jean-Pierre Simon (1764–1810 or 1813).

A nightmare is an unpleasant dream that can cause a strong negative emotional response from the mind, typically fear or horror, but also despair, anxiety and great sadness. The dream may contain situations of danger, discomfort, psychological or physical terror. Sufferers usually awaken in a state of distress and may be unable to return to sleep for a prolonged period of time.

=== Night terror ===
A night terror, also known as a sleep terror or pavor nocturnus, is a parasomnia disorder that predominantly affects children, causing feelings of terror or dread. Night terrors should not be confused with nightmares, which are bad dreams that cause the feeling of horror or fear.

=== Déjà vu ===
One theory of déjà vu attributes the feeling of having previously seen or experienced something to having dreamed about a similar situation or place, and forgetting about it until one seems to be mysteriously reminded of the situation or the place while awake.

=== Melatonin ===
Melatonin is a natural hormone secreted by the brain's pineal gland, inducing nocturnal behaviors in animals and sleep in humans during nighttime. Chemically isolated in 1958, melatonin has been marketed as a sleep aid since the 1990s and is currently sold in the United States as an over-the-counter product requiring no prescription. Anecdotal reports and formal research studies over the past few decades have established a link between melatonin supplementation and more vivid dreams.

== See also ==
- Dream dictionary
- Dream incubation
- Dream of Macsen Wledig
- Dream pop
- Dream sequence
- Dream yoga
- Dreamcatcher
- Dreams in analytical psychology
- Dreamwork
- False awakening
- Hatsuyume
- Incubus
- Lilith, a Sumerian dream demoness
- List of dream diaries
- Mare (folklore)
- Mabinogion
- Recurring dream
- Sleep in animals
- Sleep paralysis
- Spirit spouse
- Succubus
- Works based on dreams
