= Don Vaughan =

Don Vaughan may refer to:

- Don Vaughan (ice hockey), Canadian ice hockey coach
- Don Vaughan (landscape architect) (born 1937), American landscape architect

== See also ==
- Don Vaughn, American DJ and neuroscientist
