= Gradient Salience Model =

Model of figurative language comprehension

The Gradient Salience model is a model of figurative language comprehension proposed by Rachel Giora in 2002 as an alternative to the standard pragmatic model.

It offers a possible explanation for the results obtained in various contemporary studies, in which figurative language is processed as fast as literal language.

== Salient and non salient meanings ==
The definition of saliency is included in Rachel Giora's (2002) article "Literal vs. figurative language: Different or equal?". Salient meanings are meanings which are stored in the mental lexicon. They are most prominent in language, as they are the most familiar, conventional, frequent and prototypical. Non salient meanings, on the other hand, are meanings which are relatively new to language. They are novel and infrequent.

== Assumptions ==
The Gradient Salience model assumes that the processing of metaphorical expressions depends on the meaning's saliency.

- Salient meanings are processed faster than non salient ones, as they are more familiar. That is why conventional metaphors and literal expressions are processed faster than novel metaphors.
- Non salient meanings are processed slower.

== See also ==
- Graded Salience Hypothesis
