= Rafael Yuste =

Spanish-American neuroscientist (born 1963)

Rafael Yuste MD, PhD
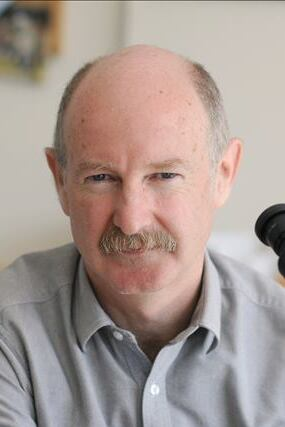
- Yuste in 2014
- Born: April 25, 1963; Madrid, Spain
- Citizenship: Spanish, American
- Education: Universidad Autónoma de Madrid, Rockefeller University
- Known for: calcium imaging technique, brain activity map
- Scientific career
- Fields: Neurobiology
- Workplaces: Columbia University
- Thesis: Optical studies of calcium dynamics in developing neocortical neurons
- Doctoral advisors: Torsten Wiesel, Lawrence C. Katz
- Notable students: Erik Hoel

Rafael Yuste (born April 25, 1963) is a Spanish–American neurobiologist. He is one of the initiators of the BRAIN Initiative announced in 2013. He is currently a professor at Columbia University.

== Biography ==
Yuste was born on born April 25, 1963 in Madrid, Spain. Yuste's interest in neuroscience arose early, inspired by books like Santiago Ramón y Cajal's Los Tónicos de la Voluntad: Reglas y consejos sobre investigación científica ) (The Tonics of the Will: Rules and Advice on Scientific Research) and supported by his parents. He studied medicine at the Universidad Autónoma de Madrid and its Fundación Jiménez Díaz Hospital (1982–1987). Finding the treatment and understanding of mental diseases as "primitive", Yuste decided that instead of practicing medicine he would work on laying the scientific basis for future treatments through basic biological research. He worked for two summers (1985/86) in the laboratory of the Nobel Prize laureate Sydney Brenner at the University of Cambridge, but the budget cuts of Margaret Thatcher's government made him look for PhD opportunities in the United States. In 1987 he was admitted to Rockefeller University and joined the group of Nobel laureate Torsten Wiesel, working with Lawrence C. Katz. There he developed the calcium imaging technique to measure and monitor the activity of neuronal populations. The technique is based on the fact that when an electric signal depolarizes a neuron, its calcium channels are activated, thus allowing Ca^{2+} ions to enter the cell. If one brings a calcium-sensitive dye into neurons in the brain, one can detect under the microscope when a neuron is active. The technique is detailed in Yuste's doctoral thesis Optical studies of calcium dynamics in developing neocortical neurons (1992), which was directed by Wiesel and Katz. It has since become one of the technical pillars of neurobiology.

Yuste then moved to David Tank's group at Bell Laboratories where he worked four years as a postdoc, combining calcium imaging with the two-photon microscope invented by Winfried Denk and, through discussions with John Hopfield and David Tank, becoming convinced of the importance of neural networks (rather than just single neurons) for understanding the functioning of the brain (connectionism).

In 1996 Yuste became an assistant professor in the Department of Biological Sciences at Columbia University, obtaining tenure in 2002 and becoming a full professor in 2006. Since 2004 he is also co-director of the Kavli Institute for Brain Science at Columbia University and since 2014 the director of Columbia's Neurotechnology Center. Since 2019 he has been the Director of the NeuroRights Initiative.

In 2013 Yuste received the NIH Director's Pioneer Award with a grant of US$2.5 million to fund research to test the hypothesis of the cortex as a random circuit using novel two-photon imaging methods in a large-scale study of the mouse cortical microcircuit.

As of 2021 Yuste has published more than 260 papers. According to Google Scholar he has been cited more than 38,000 times for an h-index of 105.

In 2019 Yuste was appointed Ikerbasque Research Professor and since then he works several weeks per year at the Donostia International Physics Center in San Sebastián, Spain. In addition, he has served, or currently serves, on the scientific advisory board of several institutes, foundations, and companies in the United States, Spain, and Israel, such as the Fundación Gaeda, BIOFISIKA, a joint Biophysics Research Centre of the Spanish National Research Council and the University of the Basque Country, or Harvard's Conte Center (2013-2017). Yuste has served on the editorial board of numerous professional journals, among them Frontiers in Neural Circuits (chief editor, 2006-2013) and Cerebral Cortex (associate editor since 1998). Yuste co-founded the Neurorights Foundation with human rights lawyer Jared Gesner after both won Global Leadership Prizes from the Tällberg Foundation.

== Brain Activity Map and BRAIN Initiative ==
In 2011 at a meeting with funding agencies, Yuste proposed the goal of developing technologies to "record every spike from every neuron" and then co-authored together with George M. Church, Paul Alivisatos, Ralph Greenspan, and Michael Roukes a white paper to elaborate this idea as a large-scale scientific project (then called the "Brain Activity Map Project") modeled on the Human Genome Project. Two years later then president Barack Obama announced the US BRAIN Initiative that now funds neuroscience research in over 500 laboratories and is slated to last until 2025. Yuste has warned against spreading the funds of the initiative too thin and argued that a focused effort is required to develop the technologies needed for large-scale, real-time brain imaging with single-neuron resolution that would be made available at observatory-like centers to the scientific community. Yuste has also spearheaded the development of ethical guidelines for neurotechnology and AI (ref Goering 2016 and Yuste 2017), proposing that five new NeuroRights be added to the Universal Declaration of Human Rights, to protect human mental privacy, identity, agency and equal access to cognitive enhancement and also prevent algorithm biases. In 2018, professor Yuste was awarded the Tällberg/Eliasson Foundation prize due to his commitment to exploring the ethical implications of using emerging AI in the field of neurotechnology. This prize, which is "awarded annually to outstanding leaders who demonstrate the willingness and capacity to address the complexity of 21st-century challenges in innovative, risk-taking, and ethical ways, and whose work is global in aspiration or implication and is rooted in universal values" is a substantial honor.

== Selected honors and awards ==
- 1985 Young Researcher Award, National Research Council, Cajal Institute, Madrid, Spain
- 1996 Sloan Research Fellowship
- 1996 Klingenstein Foundation Young Investigator Award
- 1997 Basil O'Connor Young Investigator Award
- 1997 EJLB Foundation Young Investigator Award
- 1997 Epilepsy Foundation of America Young Investigator Award
- 1997 Beckman Young Investigators Award
- 2001 John Merck Scholars Award
- 2002 Mayor's Young Investigator Award for Excellence in Science and Technology, New York City
- 2002 Young Investigator Award, Society for Neuroscience
- 2013 NIH Director's Pioneer Award
- 2014 Lenfest Faculty Award Columbia University
- 2012 Named "Five to Watch in 2013", Nature Magazine
- 2015 Premio Lección Conmemorativa Jiménez Díaz
- 2015 Corresponding Member Spanish Royal Academy of Science
- 2015 Corresponding Member Spanish Royal Academy of Medicine
- 2017 Alumni Prize, Universidad Autónoma Madrid
- 2016 Telva Science Prize
- 2017 “Hero” Award, Fundación Querer
- 2018 Tällberg SNF Eliasson Global Leadership Prize
- 2020 Cajal Diploma
- 2020 Vannevar Bush Faculty Award

== Selected publications ==
=== Primary research ===
- Carrillo-Reid, L., Han, S., Yang, W., Akrouh, A., and Yuste, R. (2019). Controlling visually-guided behavior by holographic activation of cortical ensembles. Cell 178, 447-457..
- Carrillo-Reid, L., Yang, W., Bando, Y., Peterka, D. and Yuste, R. (2016). Imprinting and recalling cortical ensembles. Science 353: 691-694.
- Ikegaya, Yuji; Aaron, Gloster; Cossart, Rosa; Aronov, Dmitriy; Lampl, Ilan; Ferster, David; Yuste, Rafael (2004). "Synfire Chains and Cortical Songs: Temporal Modules of Cortical Activity". Science. 304 (5670): 559–564. doi:10.1126/science.1093173.
- Cossart, R., Aronov, D. and Yuste, R. (2003). Attractor dynamics of network UP states in the neocortex. Nature 423: 283-8
- Yuste, Rafael; Denk, Winfried (1995). "Dendritic spines as basic functional units of neuronal integration". Nature. 375: 682–684. doi:10.1038/375682a0.
- Yuste, R., Peinado, A. and Katz, L. C. (1992). Neuronal domains in developing neocortex. Science 257: 665-669

=== Reviews ===
- Yang, Weijian; Yuste, Rafael (2017). "In vivo imaging of neural activity". Nature Methods. 14: 349–359. doi:10.1038/nmeth.4230.
- Yuste, R. (2015). From the neuron doctrine to neural networks. Nature Reviews Neuroscience 16: 487-497
- Yuste, R. (2010). Dendritic Spines. MIT Press
- Yuste, Rafael; Bonhoeffer, Tobias (2001). "Morphological changes in dendritic spines associated with long-term synaptic plasticity". Annual Review of Neuroscience. 24: 1071–89. doi:10.1146/annurev.neuro.24.1.1071.

=== Policy and commentary ===
- Yuste, Rafael; Goering, Sara; Agüera y Arcas, Blaise; et al. (2017-11-09). "Four ethical priorities for neurotechnologies and AI". Nature. 551 (7679): 159–163. doi:10.1038/551159a.
- Yuste, Rafael; Church, George M. (2014). "The new century of the brain" (pdf). Scientific American. 310: 38–45. doi:10.1038/scientificamerican0314-38.
- Alivisatos, A. P.; Chun, M.; Church, G. M.; Greenspan, R. J.; Roukes, M. L.; Yuste, R. (2012). "The Brain Activity Map Project and the Challenge of Functional Connectomics". Neuron. 74: 970–974. doi:10.1016/j.neuron.2012.06.006.
