= Somniale Danielis =

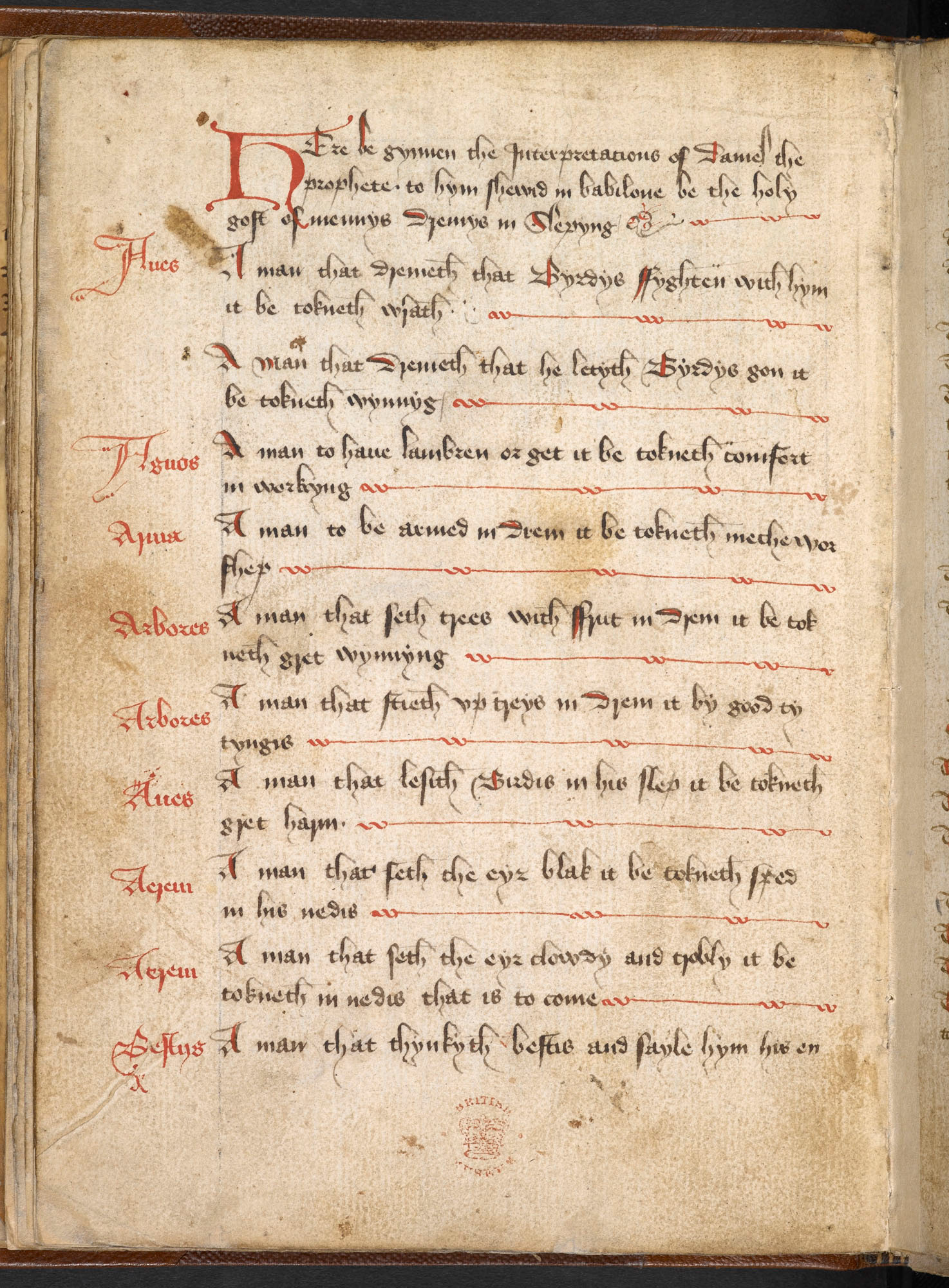
- Author: Unknown; various.
- Language: Latin, Arabic, Vernacular.
- Genre: Dream manual

The Somniale Danielis (Somnia Danielis), translated as The Dreams of Daniel, is a manual explaining the meanings of dreams. Originally written in Latin, the book was dedicated to the prophet Daniel from the Old Testament, but Daniel is not attributed as the author of the dream book. An explanation for the dedication is that Daniel was considered a father of dream sciences, and his prophetic visions served as inspiration for the arts of dream interpretation. One of the main sources for the contents of the book is the Oneirocritica of Artemidorus.

The Somniale Danielis was very important during the Middle Ages for explaining dreams, specifically in the identification of meaning and transferable knowledge. Although the Church attempted various bans on divination, the interpretation of dreams through dream books was popular. The first manuscript, according to scholars, was likely written in the 5th century, and the text was repeatedly distributed and remained popular until the sixteenth century. The vernacular works of literary figures such as Dante and Boccaccio used the Somniale Danielis as inspiration to create relatable stories based on dream narratives for popular audiences.

== Contents and structure ==
The Somniale Danielis has a basic glossary layout, in which key terms corresponded directly to the main theme or content of the dream. The words were arranged alphabetically, followed by concise interpretation of the dream. Examples of the glossary include references to specific creatures, objects, events etc., often paired with whether the vision should be interpreted as positive or negative. The Somniale Danielis also contained tests by which the importance of the dream could be ascertained. These tests included questioning such as the time of night they dreamed or if they had overeaten before bed. The manuscripts were often colour-coded, for example the subject of the dream would be written in red, while the explanation would be written in black.

The structure takes influence from Greek manuscripts, especially Oneirocritical texts. The Somniale Danielis was translated into Arabic and European vernaculars, and thousands of unique versions are believed to have existed, though most are assumed lost.

== Interpretation and significance ==
Historical study of the dream manual has aimed at comparing local editions of the manual in aim to isolate unique cultural features of a given location, to establish the manuals as “witnesses of a popular culture”. The Somniale Danielis is perceived to collate traditional beliefs that were once transmitted orally. Historians have tried to recreate and reinterpret the culture of the lower classes of European populations by attempting to understand the dreams of people and the meanings they imparted on society. It is believed that what was included in the manuals tended to be things which were important to that given society, so by investigating each individual manuscript of the Somniale Danielis, we can learn more about the popular culture of the Middle Ages, not just as geographically homogeneous, but as specific to particular regions, or in some cases to particular towns or communes. Scholarly consensus also believes that dream manuals are one of the few pieces of literature of the Middle Ages which transcended class, and are applicable to all levels of the social strata.
