= Graded Salience Hypothesis =

Theory in psycholinguistics

The Graded Salience Hypothesis is a theory regarding the psycholinguistic processing of word meaning, specifically in the context of irony, developed by Rachel Giora. It assumes that priority is given in the psychological activation and semantic retrieval of salient over less salient meanings inside the mental lexicon in the process of language comprehension.

== Lexical salience ==
The meaning(s) of a word can be considered salient if the associated meanings(s) is/are coded for in the mental lexicon. That said, the degree of salience of a given word meaning cannot be viewed as a permanent, defining characteristic, but rather as a function of a number of psycholinguistic factors, such as frequency, conventionality, familiarity, and prototypicality. The more frequent, conventional, familiar, or prototypical a given word meaning is, the greater degree of salience it holds.

== Hypothesis ==
The graded salience hypothesis revolves around two major assumptions: 1. A salient meaning of a word is always activated and cannot be bypassed. 2. A salient meaning is always activated before any less salient meanings.

== Role of context ==
In the view of the graded salience hypothesis, context has a very limited role. Even though it can facilitate activation of a word meaning, it cannot inhibit the process of the more salient meaning activation.

== See also ==
- Gradient Salience Model
- Irony
