= Erik Hoel =

American neuroscientist, neurophilosopher, and author

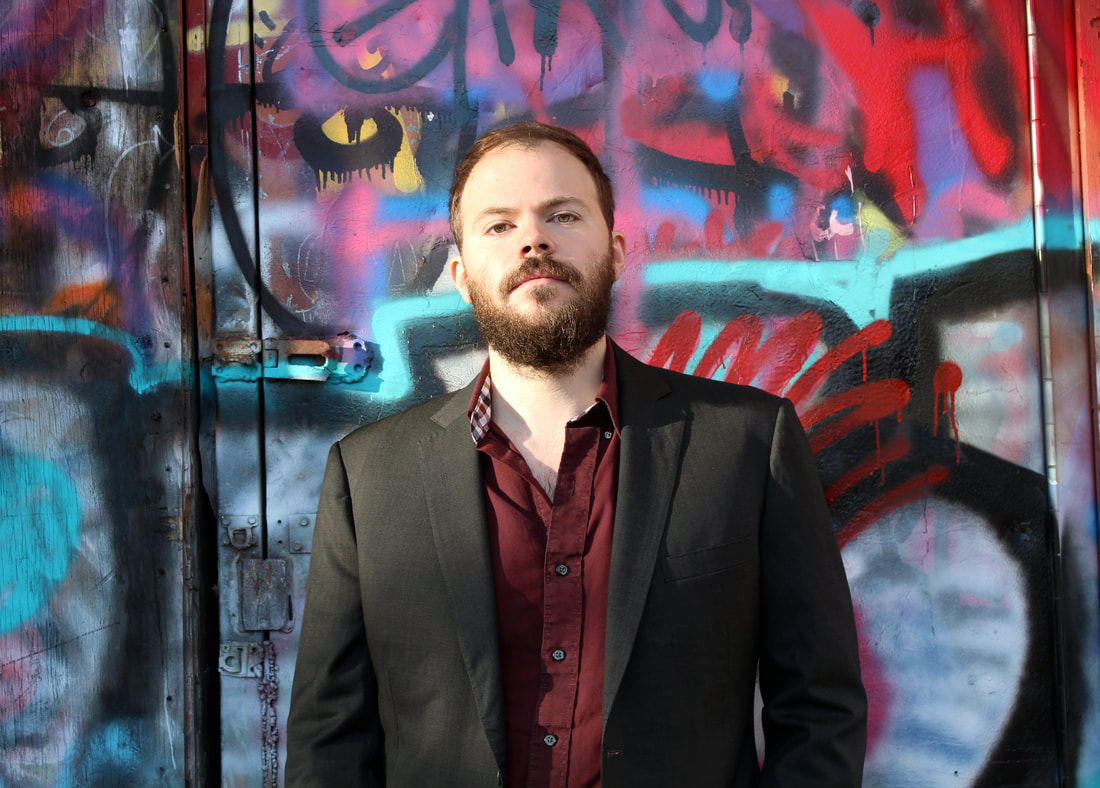
- Hoel in 2024
- Education: Hampshire College (BA); University of Wisconsin-Madison (PhD)
- Scientific career
- Fields: Neuroscience, cognitive science; neurophilosophy
- Workplaces: Tufts University; Columbia University
- Doctoral advisor: Giulio Tononi
- Website: theintrinsicperspective.com

Erik Hoel is an American neuroscientist, neurophilosopher, and fiction writer. His main areas of research are the study and philosophy of consciousness, cognition, biological function of dreams, and mathematical theories of emergence. He is noted for using information theory and causal analysis to develop mathematical models to explore and understand the basis of consciousness and dreams. Hoel holds a PhD in neuroscience from the University of Wisconsin–Madison and in 2018 was recipient of the Forbes 30 Under 30 – Science award.

== Career ==
=== Research ===
Hoel was previously a postdoctoral researcher in the lab of Rafael Yuste at Columbia University and a visiting fellow at the Institute for Advanced Study in Princeton. He is known for the idea of "causal emergence", a formal theory about how macroscales of systems can have stronger causal relationships than their underlying microscale. He has also developed the overfitted brain hypothesis, on how dreams evolved as a way to prevent overfitting during learning.

=== Writing ===
The novelist Andre Dubus III tutored Hoel on writing when he was 13.

Hoel has published essays in The Atlantic and The Baffler, among others.

The Revelations

In 2021, Hoel published The Revelations, a mystery novel set at New York University concerning a fictional scholarship program that brings together eight young consciousness researchers, one of whom is murdered. Publishers Weekly called it "a dizzying, impressive debut".

== Personal life ==
Hoel is married to Julia Buntaine Hoel, a fellow neuroscientist, artist, and founder of the SciArt Initiative. They have a son, born in 2021.

== Bibliography ==
Fiction

- Hoel, Erik (2021). The Revelations: A Novel (First ed.). New York: Harry N. Abrams. ISBN 978-1-4197-5022-9.

Nonfiction

- Hoel, Erik (July 25, 2023). The World Behind the World: Consciousness, Free Will, and the Limits of Science. Avid Reader Press / Simon & Schuster. ISBN 978-1-9821-5938-2.

Selected articles

- Kleiner, Johannes; Hoel, Erik (February 10, 2021). "Falsification and consciousness". Neuroscience of Consciousness. 2021 (1) niab001. doi:10.1093/nc/niab001. PMC 8052953. PMID 33889423.
- Wenzel, Michael; Han, Shuting; Smith, Elliot H.; Hoel, Erik; Greger, Bradley; House, Paul A.; Yuste, Rafael (May 2019). "Reduced Repertoire of Cortical Microstates and Neuronal Ensembles in Medically Induced Loss of Consciousness". Cell Systems. 8 (5): 467–474.e4. doi:10.1016/j.cels.2019.03.007. PMC 6544156. PMID 31054810.
- Hoel, Erik P.; Albantakis, Larissa; Marshall, William; Tononi, Giulio (2016). "Can the macro beat the micro? Integrated information across spatiotemporal scales". Neuroscience of Consciousness. 2016 (1) niw012. doi:10.1093/nc/niw012. PMC 6367968. PMID 30788150.
- Varley, Thomas; Hoel, Erik (2021). "Emergence as the conversion of information: A unifying theory". arXiv:2104.13368 [cs.IT].
- Marrow, Scythia; Michaud, Eric J.; Hoel, Erik (December 18, 2020). "Examining the Causal Structures of Deep Neural Networks Using Information Theory". Entropy. 22 (12): 1429. Bibcode:2020Entrp..22.1429M. doi:10.3390/e22121429. PMC 7766755. PMID 33353094.
- Klein, Brennan; Hoel, Erik (April 4, 2020). "The Emergence of Informative Higher Scales in Complex Networks". Complexity. 2020: 1–12. arXiv:1907.03902. doi:10.1155/2020/8932526.
- Hoel, Erik; Klein, Brennan; Swain, Anshuman; Grebenow, Ross; Levin, Michael (May 3, 2020). "Evolution leads to emergence: An analysis of protein interactomes across the tree of life". bioRxiv 10.1101/2020.05.03.074419.
- Hoel, Erik (April 26, 2017). "When the Map Is Better Than the Territory". Entropy. 19 (5): 188. arXiv:1612.09592. Bibcode:2017Entrp..19..188H. doi:10.3390/e19050188.
- Hoel, Erik P.; Albantakis, Larissa; Tononi, Giulio (December 3, 2013). "Quantifying causal emergence shows that macro can beat micro". Proceedings of the National Academy of Sciences. 110 (49): 19790–19795. Bibcode:2013PNAS..11019790H. doi:10.1073/pnas.1314922110. PMC 3856819. PMID 24248356.
- Hoel, Erik (May 2021). "The overfitted brain: Dreams evolved to assist generalization". Patterns. 2 (5) 100244. doi:10.1016/j.patter.2021.100244. PMC 8134940. PMID 34036289.
- Hoel, Erik P.; Albantakis, Larissa; Cirelli, Chiara; Tononi, Giulio (April 1, 2016). "Synaptic refinement during development and its effect on slow-wave activity: a computational study". Journal of Neurophysiology. 115 (4): 2199–2213. doi:10.1152/jn.00812.2015. PMC 4869496. PMID 26843602.
