= Don Vaughn =

American neuroscientist

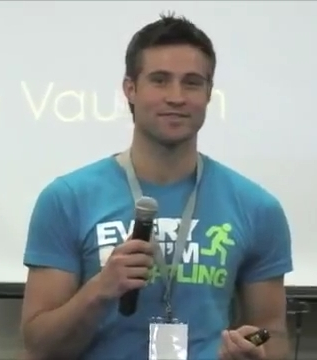
- Don Vaughn in October 2011
- Born: San Diego, California, U.S.
- Education: Stanford University
- Scientific career
- Fields: Neuroscience
- Website: www.donvaughn.com

Don Vaughn is an American neuroscientist and science communicator. He is a postdoctoral scholar at UCLA's Semel Institute for Neuroscience and Behavior and adjunct faculty at Santa Clara University.

His perceptual research aims to elucidate neural mechanisms of consciousness and perception using machine learning. Vaughn has presented his findings on empathy and neuroplasticity in a TEDx talk as well as at the Society for Neuroscience and DARPA Network Narratives.

== Science ==
=== Research ===
Working in David Eagleman's laboratory, Vaughn helped discover that brains create perception by integrating peri-dictively, that is, information both before and after an event contribute to our perception of it. Eagleman and Vaughn also discovered the "glimpse effect", in which briefly glimpsed photographs of people were judged to be more attractive than the same photographs viewed for a long duration.

As a QCBio Collaboratory Fellow, he teaches a seminar on modern statistical methods (permutations, machine learning, bootstrapping) to UCLA faculty, postdoctoral fellows, and students. He also taught machine learning at the UCLA NITP Summer Course. He earned his PhD in neuroscience at UCLA with his thesis entitled "Using Machine-Learning to Diagnose Perception, Feeling, and Action: A Study of Neuroimaging, Psychometric, and Insurance Claims Data".

Recently, Vaughn and Ariana Anderson received a grant from UCLA's CTSI Research to develop ChatterBaby, an app that facilitates communication between hearing-impaired parents and their hearing-abled babies. The app facilitates communication between parent and child by translating sound into colored waveforms in real-time, allowing parents to develop a visual intuition of what their and their babies's speech sounds like. This "sensory substitution" will allow parents to not only recognize patterns when their child speaks, but also tailor their own speech patterns to what best allows them to communicate with their child. ChatterBaby is featured in Vaughn's TEDx talk, but is undergoing more development before public release.

Vaughn and Eagleman created an app, eyeFi which acts as a reverse visualizer, turning video information into sound. eyeFi is an entertainment of a deeper concept the two were exploring on using sensory substitution to overcome visual impairments by translating vision into audio for the blind.

=== TEDx ===
Vaughn gave a TEDx talk at UCLA on neuroplasticity, entitled "Neurohacking: Rewiring Your Brain".

== Media ==
Vaughn has made TV appearances on Entertainment Tonight, The Today Show, Nova ScienceNow, ShapingHOU, Great Day Houston, and Local KPRC. Vaughn has been featured in Time, 002houston, Cosmopolitan, Houston Magazine, First Class Magazine, Houston Chronicle, Daily Bruin, and Culture Map.

== Music career ==
From 2012 to 2015 Vaughn was also a DJ and producer. His first album, entitled The Don Vaughn Experiment, featured former 98 Degrees singer Nick Lachey, reached #28 on the iTunes Dance charts.

Victoria Vesna, Mark Cohen, Vaughn, and others in the art and science community at UCLA presented a performance entitled "brainstorming" at Sonos Studios in Los Angeles. The exhibit explored the effect of music on feelings of connectedness, and how brain activity changed as a result.
