= Hippocampal sclerosis =

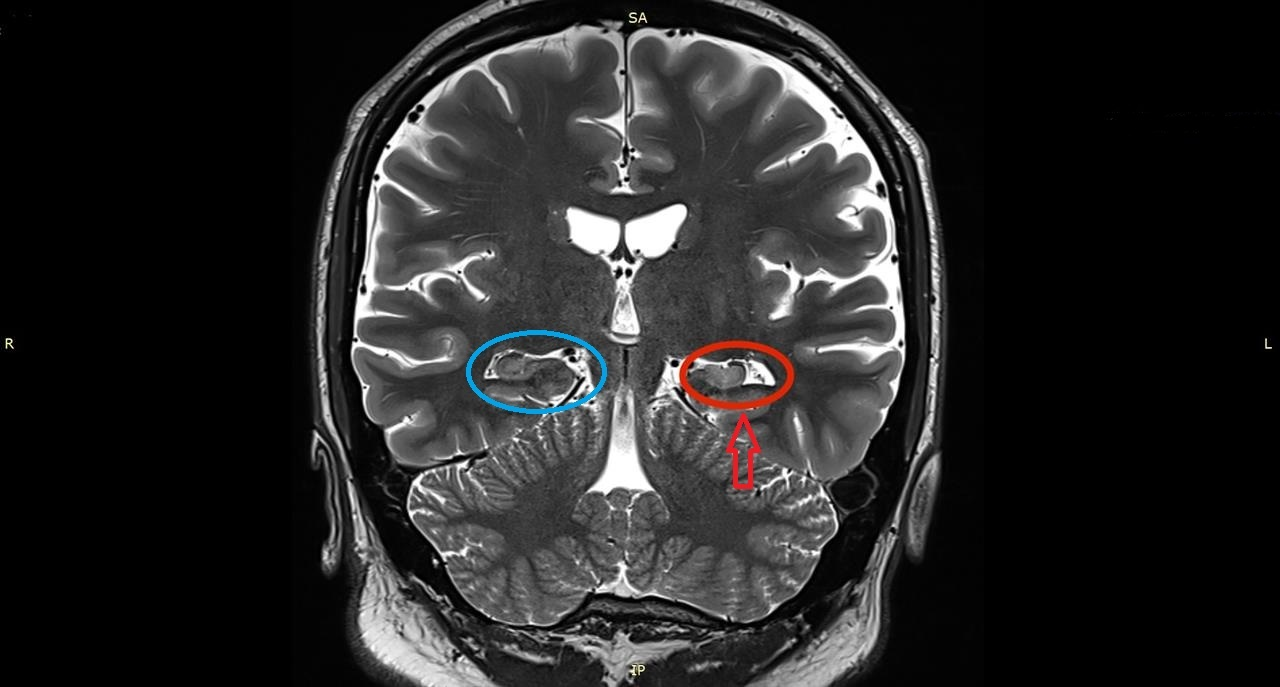
- Mesial temporal sclerosis (MTS)
- Specialty: Neurology

Hippocampal sclerosis (HS) or mesial temporal sclerosis (MTS) is a neuropathological condition with severe neuronal cell loss and gliosis in the hippocampus. Neuroimaging tests such as magnetic resonance imaging (MRI) and positron emission tomography (PET) may identify individuals with hippocampal sclerosis. Hippocampal sclerosis occurs in three distinct settings: mesial temporal lobe epilepsy, adult neurodegenerative disease and acute brain injury.

== History ==
In 1825, Camille Bouchet and Jean-Baptiste Cazauvieilh described palpable firmness and atrophy of the uncus and medial temporal lobe of brains from epileptic and non-epileptic individuals. In 1880, Wilhelm Sommer investigated 90 brains and described the classical Ammon's horn sclerosis pattern, severe neuronal cell loss in hippocampal subfield cornum Ammonis 1 (CA1) and some neuronal cell loss in hippocampal subfield CA4. a finding later confirmed by Emil Bratz. In 1927, Walther Spielmeyer described cell loss of all hippocampal subfields, the total Ammon's horn sclerosis pattern, and in 1966, James H. Margerison and John Arthur Nicholas Corsellis described cell loss primarily involving the CA4 subfield, the end folium sclerosis pattern. In 1935. Karl Heinz Stauder linked mesial temporal lobe seizures to hippocampal sclerosis.

Hippocampal sclerosis was later found to occur in older adults with neurodegenerative diseases such as frontotemporal lobar degeneration and amyotrophic lateral sclerosis. In 2006, researchers determined that amyotrophic lateral sclerosis and frontotemporal lobar degeneration are often TAR DNA-binding protein 43 (TDP-43) proteinopathies. In 2009, researchers recognized that about 10-20% of individuals with frontotemporal lobar degeneration not caused by tau proteinopathy occurred because of a RNA-binding protein FUS (FUS) proteinopathy; hippocampal sclerosis often accompanied the FUS proteinopathy.

In 1994, Dickson et al. described hippocampal sclerosis occurring in elderly demented individuals > 80 years old with disproportionately greater impaired memory. In 2007, researchers determined that this neurodegenerative disease, Limbic-predominant age-related TDP-43 encephalopathy (LATE), is a TDP-43 proteinopathy.

== Pathology ==
=== Mesial temporal lobe epilepsy ===
The typical brain sample is a surgical specimen, a brain sample obtained during epilepsy surgery. The International League Against Epilepsy (ILAE) defines three hippocampal sclerosis (HS) types: predominant neuronal cell loss in subfields CA1 and CA4 (HS ILAE type 1); subfield CA1 (HS ILAE type 2); subfield CA4 (HS ILAE type 3). The classic and total Ammon's horn sclerosis pattern correspond to HS ILAE type 1. Among brain samples with hippocampal sclerosis, HS ILAE type 1 is the most prevalent, HS ILAE type 2 has a 5-10% prevalence, and HS ILAE type 3 has a 4-7.4% prevalence. HS ILAE type 3 is generally observed in cases of dual pathology, such as focal cortical dysplasia or brain tumors. Mossy fiber sprouting is common.

Dentate gyrus granule cell dispersion refers to a granule cell layer that is widened, poorly demarcated, or accompanied by granule cells outside the layer (ectopic granule cells). Although this pattern was thought to be linked to hippocampal sclerosis, a comparative study has shown this association is not correct as the same pattern occurs in brains without hippocampal sclerosis.

A dual pathology is a temporal lobe abnormality that accompanying hippocampal sclerosis. This occurs in about 15% of those with hippocampal sclerosis who completed epilepsy surgery. The dual pathologies include cavernous hemangioma, heterotopia, cortical dysplasia, arteriovenous malformation, dysembryoplastic neuroepithelial tumor, cerebral infarction and cerebral contusion. The common association is dual pathology with HS ILAE type 3.

=== Adult neurodegenerative disease ===
The typical brain sample is an autopsy specimen, a brain sample obtained during an autopsy.

For elderly adults with suspected LATE, TDP-43 immunochemistry will determine if TDP-43 proteinopathy caused hippocampal sclerosis. Pyramidal cell loss and gliosis occurs in the CA1 sector, subiculum, entorhinal cortex, and the amygdala. The hippocampal neuronal cell loss and gliosis are disproportionate to the Alzheimer's disease "neuropathological change in the same section." One sided hippocampal sclerosis has a 40-50% prevalence even when the TDP-43 inclusions involve both sides of the brain. TDP-43 immunochemistry does not identify TDP-43 proteinopathy if hippocampal sclerosis arises from hypoxia or mesial temporal lobe epilepsy. Mossy fiber sprouting is uncommon.

The LATE consensus working group report proposed a LATE staging system based on the anatomic location of TPD-43 proteinopathy: amygdala alone (stage1), amygdala and hippocampus (stage 2), and amygdala, hippocampus, and middle frontal gyrus (stage 3); hippocampal sclerosis is not sufficient or necessary for staging.

Immunochemistry may identify RNA-binding protein FUS, phosphorylated tau protein or ubiquitin if frontotemporal lobar degeneration is not caused by TGP-43 proteinopathy.

== Neuroimaging ==
=== Mesial temporal lobe epilepsy ===
On an MRI T2-weighted or T2–fluid‐attenuated inversion recovery (FLAIR) scan, hippocampal sclerosis appears as an increased signal, smaller sized (atrophic) hippocampus with a less well-defined internal structure. Increased signal means that hippocampal sclerosis will appear brighter on the MRI image. Less well-defined internal structure means the expected sharp boundaries between hippocampal gray and white matter structures are absent. The total volume of the hippocampus is also reduced. The reduced volume arises from neuronal cell loss, and increased signal arises from gliosis.

The 18F-fluorodeoxyglucose PET (18F-FDG) scan may show decreased glucose metabolism in the temporal lobe with hippocampal atrophy. This region of decreased glucose metabolism may extend beyond the hippocampus and involve the medial and lateral temporal lobe.

=== Adult neurodegenerative disease ===
In LATE, MRI often shows asymmetrical hippocampal atrophy that progresses in a rostral-caudal gradient. Inferior frontal, anterior temporal, and insular cortex atrophy often accompanies LATE hippocampal atrophy, the same anatomical pattern of TDP-43 proteinopathy at autopsy. Reduced subiculum and CA1 volumes identified by MRI correspond to hippocampal sclerosis later identified at autopsy.

The 18F-FDG PET scans of those with LATE show reduced glucose metabolism in the medial temporal lobe including the hippocampus.

== Disorders with hippocampal sclerosis ==
=== Mesial temporal lobe epilepsy ===
Hippocampal sclerosis is the most common brain abnormality in those with temporal lobe epilepsy. Hippocampal sclerosis may occur in children under 2 years of age with 1 instance seen as early as 6 months. About 70% of those evaluated for temporal lobe epilepsy surgery have hippocampal sclerosis. About 7% of those with temporal lobe epilepsy have familial mesial temporal lobe epilepsy, and 57% of those with familial mesial temporal lobe epilepsy have MRI evidence of hippocampal sclerosis.

Electroencephalographic and surgical studies show that temporal lobe seizures arise from hippocampal regions with severe neuronal cell loss. Intracranial electroencephalogram records anterior hippocampal seizure onset in those with severe anterior hippocampal neuronal loss and combined anterior and posterior hippocampal seizure onset in those with severe combined anterior and posterior neuronal cell loss. Surgical removal of the hippocampus that spares neighboring structures leads to improved seizure control in many instances of mesial temporal lobe epilepsy. The absence of hippocampal sclerosis in some with temporal lobe epilepsy suggests that uncontrolled seizures do not invariably lead to hippocampal sclerosis.

There is no clear relationship between febrile seizures and development of mesial temporal sclerosis. Investigators found that hippocampal sclerosis and greater than 10-year epilepsy duration leads to parasympathetic dysfunction, refractory epilepsy leads to sympathetic dysfunction, and left hippocampal sclerosis leads to relatively greater parasympathetic dysfunction. Hippocampal sclerosis may influence how the thalamus modulates the seizures of mesial temporal lobe epilepsy.

The morbidity and mortality of refractory epilepsy and the adverse effects of medication treatment have a severe impact on life. Those with an early age of epilepsy onset and hippocampal sclerosis have a poorer prognosis for becoming seizure-free. Among those with intractable mesial temporal lobe epilepsy and hippocampal sclerosis, about 70% become seizure-free after epilepsy surgery.

=== Adult neurodegenerative disease ===
In LATE, TDP-43, a normally non-phosphorylated protein residing in the nucleus, is phosphorylated and mislocalized in the cytoplasm and neurites. The inclusions occur in the amygdala, hippocampus, entorhinal cortex, or dentate gyrus. LATE occurs in about 20-50% of elderly individuals' brains. About 5-40% of those with LATE occur without hippocampal sclerosis. LATE appears as amnestic dementia similar to Alzheimer's disease in elderly adults > 80 years of age.

Hippocampal sclerosis occurs in other neurodegenerative diseases. Hippocampal sclerosis occurs in about 66% of those with frontotemporal lobar degeneration arising from TDP-43 or FUS proteinopathy. Hippocampal sclerosis occurs in about 60% of those with progressive supranuclear palsy TDP-43 proteinopathy (PSP-TDP) and in about 5% of those with Lewy body dementia. Hippocampal sclerosis occurs in about 23% of those with chronic traumatic encephalopathy; TP-43 proteinopathy accompanied 96% of those with hippocampal sclerosis.

=== Acute brain injury ===
Hippocampal sclerosis may occur with hypoxic-ischemic injury, hypoglycemia, toxins (kainic acid, domoic acid), and viral human herpesvirus 6 limbic encephalitis.
