= Howard Feldman =

Howard Feldman may refer to:

- Howard Feldman (lawyer), American lawyer
- Howard Feldman (neuroscientist), American neuroscientist
