= Limbic-predominant age-related TDP-43 encephalopathy =

Neurodegenerative disease caused by TDP-43

- Other names: LATE Neuropathological Change, Limbic-Predominant Amnestic Neurodegenerative Syndrome
- Multiple coronal MRI scans of a patient with eventual autopsy proven LATE showing the progression of brain atrophy from year 1 (A) to year 4 (B), alongside a color-coded overlay (C).
- Specialty: Neurology, psychiatry
- Symptoms: Memory loss, amnesia, disorientation, mood swings
- Complications: Brain damage, dementia, falls, infections, and aspiration pneumonia in terminal stages
- Usual onset: Over 80 years old
- Duration: Long term
- Causes: Unknown
- Risk factors: Old age, genetics, hypertension, lack of physical and mental exercise
- Diagnostic method: Autopsy
- Differential diagnosis: Normal brain aging, Alzheimer's disease
- Treatment: Palliative care
- Medication: None
- Prognosis: 100% mortality rate, life expectancy varies

Limbic-predominant age-related TDP-43 encephalopathy (LATE) is a common neurodegenerative disease and form of dementia. It is a prevalent medical condition with impaired memory and thinking in advanced age. In other words, the symptoms of LATE are similar to those of Alzheimer's disease, which historically led to frequent misdiagnosis. The acronym LATE stands for Limbic-predominant Age-related TDP-43 Encephalopathy. "Limbic" is related to the brain areas first involved, "age-related" and the name "LATE" itself refer to the onset of disease usually in persons aged 80 or older. "TDP-43" indicates the aberrant mis-folded protein (or proteinopathy) deposits in the brain that characterize LATE, and "encephalopathy" means illness of brain.

As of now, LATE can only be diagnosed with certainty via autopsy. The terminology used to refer to the brain changes identified in autopsy-confirmed LATE is: LATE neuropathologic change (LATE-NC). The diagnosis of LATE-NC at autopsy requires detection of pathologic TDP-43 protein deposits in the brain. For reasons that are presently unknown, the disease process of LATE-NC preferentially affects medial temporal lobe structures of the brain, particularly the amygdala and hippocampus. In a significant proportion of persons with LATE-NC, there is atrophy; cell loss and astrogliosis in the hippocampus, diagnosable at autopsy (and somewhat less specifically via MRI during life) as hippocampal sclerosis. Brains with LATE-NC and hippocampal sclerosis are relatively more affected clinically than those with LATE-NC alone.

LATE is a very common condition: autopsy studies around the world indicate that LATE-NC is present in the brains of about one-third of people over 85. LATE typically affects persons older than 75 years of age (with some exceptions) and becomes increasingly prevalent every year in advanced old age. This is in contrast to Alzheimer's disease, which tends to level off and even decrease in prevalence among persons beyond age 85 years. LATE is often comorbid with (i.e., occurs in the same brain as) other pathologic changes that are also associated with dementia, such as Alzheimer's disease, and cerebrovascular diseases.

LATE has a large impact on public health. Clinical-pathologic correlation studies have established that the presence of LATE-NC is associated with impairments in memory and thinking. In older persons whose brains lack Alzheimer's disease-type amyloid plaques and neurofibrillary tangles, the presence of LATE-NC at autopsy is associated with a relatively slow cognitive decline (in comparison with Alzheimer's disease), mostly affecting the memory domain. However, most people (~75%) beyond age 85 have some Alzheimer's disease-type pathology and in this common scenario the impact of LATE-NC is very important. Approximately one-half of persons with Alzheimer's disease pathology also have LATE-NC. In these persons, the presence of LATE-NC is associated with a swifter disease course and with more severe clinical (memory and thinking) impairment than when only Alzheimer's disease pathology is present. A common combination of brain pathologies—with Alzheimer's disease pathology, Lewy body pathology, and LATE-NC in the same brain—tends to affect younger individuals (often <75 yrs of age) and, on average, is associated with more aggressive (faster) cognitive deterioration. With or without co-existing Alzheimer's disease or other brain changes, persons with LATE-NC generally lack the clinical features of frontotemporal dementia (FTD).

== Signs and symptoms ==
=== Cognitive symptoms ===
The hallmark symptom of LATE is a progressive memory loss that predominantly affects short-term and episodic memory. This impairment is often severe enough to interfere with daily functioning and usually remains the chief neurologic deficit, unlike other types of dementia in which non-memory cognitive domains and behavioral changes might be noted earlier or more prominently. The amnestic syndrome in LATE tends to worsen gradually, leading to significant memory deficits and functional disability over time. Thus, the cognitive decline in LATE, when LATE-NC is the chief illness present, is typically relatively slow.

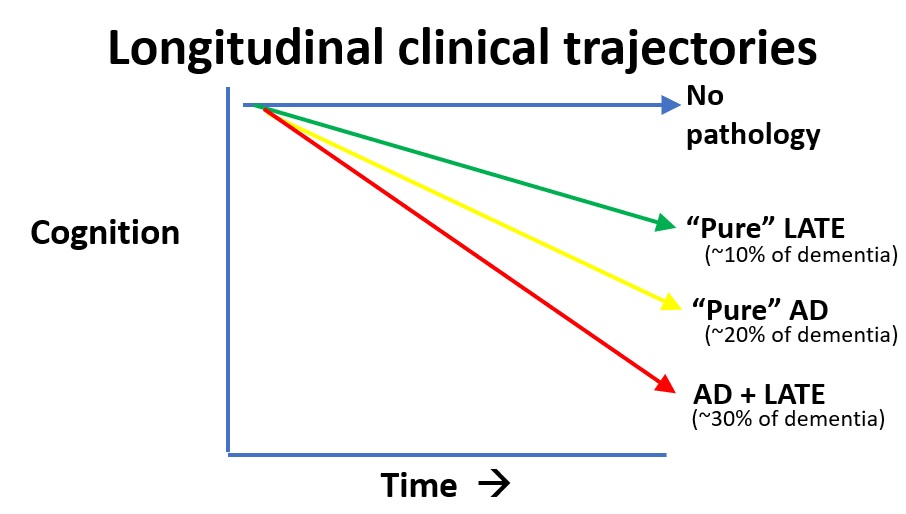
Combinations of brain pathology, and their correlation with cognitive impairment over time. AD = Alzheimer's disease. Note that the combination of AD+LATE is the most common and most severe scenario.

The term dementia refers to a clinical syndrome, rather than a particular disease process – dementia can be caused by many different subtypes of brain disease, which often occur in combination with each other. The specific implication of the term dementia is that, in the affected individual, there is cognitive impairment severe enough to impair activities of daily living such as feeding oneself. Many diseases in addition to Alzheimer's disease and LATE can (by harming brain function) contribute to the dementia clinical syndrome, and often occur in combination. For example, vascular factors ("stroke" and other blood vessel-affecting conditions, driven by such risk factors as hypertension and diabetes) and other brain diseases can cause or worsen dementia in human populations. However, up to half of severe dementia in advanced age includes both Alzheimer's disease and LATE-NC pathologies, and people with these co-pathologies are at risk for relatively swift and severe disease course.^{[2]}

== Causes ==
The exact causes of LATE are not fully understood, but a combination of factors, particularly age and genetic (i.e., inherited from one's biologic parents) risk factors, are believed to contribute to its development, as a result, multiple theories are documented.

Medical and environmental risk factors

The strongest known risk factor for LATE is advanced age. The prevalence of LATE increases significantly in individuals over 80 years old and the average patient with LATE is ten years older than the average patient with Alzheimer's disease, suggesting that aging-related biological processes—yet to be comprehensively identified (but which include TMEM106B C-terminal fragments)—play roles in the development of LATE. Although brain trauma (either single or multiple/chronic traumatic impacts) can produce brain changes that are qualitatively different from LATE-NC there may be interactions between brain trauma and LATE-NC mechanistically. Further, those with brain damage from trauma or other sources may have worse outcomes with a given burden of LATE-NC in the brain. There is indication from broader dementia research that higher educational attainment and engaging in mentally stimulating activities might delay the onset of clinical symptoms in neurodegenerative diseases. Whether this directly affects the risk of developing LATE or just modifies its presentation is still under investigation. While specific lifestyle factors directly causing LATE have not been definitively identified, general factors that affect brain health appear to influence risk of a given amount of pathology being correlated with cognitive impairment. Lifestyle factors that influence susceptibility to dementia include diet, physical activity, social and intellectual stimulation, cardiovascular health, and exposure to toxins. These may impair cognition in reciprocal relation to cognitive reserve. Notably, a 2025 study found that the brain-healthy MIND diet was associated with decreased risk for LATE with HS. Chronic inflammation in the brain is a known factor in many neurodegenerative diseases, and may also play a role in LATE. Inflammatory processes could contribute to or exacerbate TDP-43 pathology. Disruptions in normal processing of proteins (proteostasis), which include aberrant post-translational modification, protein folding, protein trafficking, and protein degradation, are likely involved in promoting TDP-43 pathology in LATE. An imbalance in these processes could lead to the accumulation of misfolded TDP-43, contributing to disease progression.

Genetic risk factors

Other major known risk factors for LATE-NC are genetic: variations in the TMEM106B, GRN, APOE, ABCC9, KCNMB2, TPCN1, TMEM68, and WWOX genes have been linked to altered risk for LATE-NC (and/or hippocampal sclerosis dementia). These genetic elements are associated with biochemical changes that affect the stability, aggregation propensity, lysosomal microenvironment, and/or cellular trafficking of TDP-43. For example, the APOE ε4 allele, that confers increased risk for Alzheimer's-type amyloid plaques and neurofibrillary tangles, also increases the risk of LATE-NC; it is also remarkable that inheriting the FTLD risk genetic-variants TMEM106B and GRN/progranulin are also implicated in modifying risk of LATE-NC.

=== Pathophysiology ===
TDP-43 (Transactive response DNA-binding protein) is a protein that normally resides in cell nuclei, and this protein is involved in regulating gene expression by binding to and modifying nucleic acids. More specifically, TDP-43 plays critical roles in RNA processing, including splicing, stability, and transport. As stated above, in healthy cells, TDP-43 is predominantly found in the cell nucleus. In LATE, TDP-43 protein abnormally accumulates in the cytoplasm of neurons and glial cells, forming pathologic aggregates. This cellular mis-localization is part of a process that disrupts TDP-43's normal nuclear functions and contributes to cellular dysfunction and neuronal death. The exact triggers of TDP-43 aggregation are not fully understood but are believed to involve both genetic predispositions, other co-pathologies occurring in the same brain, and acquired factors that may include mechanical or toxin-related stress. In normal brains and other tissues, the TDP-43 protein helps to ensure proper functioning of genes in the cell; the misfolded TDP-43 may thus impair normal gene expression regulation (so in LATE-NC, there is a loss-of-normal-function), and, the aberrant TDP-43 protein in LATE-NC may induce toxic gains of function also.

LATE neuropathology is graded based on the distribution of TDP-43 inclusions within the brain. Early stages may involve localized TDP-43 pathology in the amygdala, while more advanced stages involve the hippocampus and other medial temporal lobe structures in the individuals affected by the most advanced stage of LATE/LATE-NC, the TDP-43 pathology is far more extensive. For more details on the pathological stages of LATE-NC, see "Pathologic Examination", below.

LATE neuropathology is often associated with hippocampal sclerosis, characterized by severe neuron loss and gliosis in the hippocampus. This pathologic feature (also often readily detectable via brain MRI) significantly contributes to the memory deficits observed in LATE. LATE-NC often coexists with a small blood vessel pathology that affects cerebral arterioles, which is termed arteriolosclerosis. LATE-NC is more common in cases with comorbid tauopathy, including Alzheimer's-type plaques and tangles, primary age-related tauopathy (PART), and age-related tau astrogliopathy (ARTAG).

== Diagnosis ==
The diagnosis of LATE in live individuals is challenging because the symptoms of LATE overlap with those of other types of dementia, especially Alzheimer's disease, and there are no widely-used, specific clinical biomarkers (as of February 2026), to predict the presence of the pathology. Thus, at present LATE is diagnosed with certainty only at autopsy, i.e., through neuropathological examination. However, ongoing research aims to refine the antemortem diagnostic criteria and methods. The current approach to diagnosing LATE in living patients involves a combination of clinical evaluation, neuroimaging, and biomarker analysis, as detailed below.

As of June 2025, clinical rubrics have recently come on-line, that can be applied to predict whether a given patient is likely to have LATE-NC given the available clinical information.

In January 2025, a consensus-based clinical diagnostic rubric was developed, with the goals of identifying "Probable" and "Possible LATE" in the clinical context:

Clinical criteria for LATE*	Probable LATE (must have XX; may have X)	Possible LATE (without Ab biomarkers must have YY, can have Y, with biomarkers Z)
I. LATE: Core clinical syndrome		
1. Primary amnestic syndrome	XX	YY
2. Other cognitive domains largely spared until later in the course	XX	YY
3. Mild semantic memory impairment	X	Y
4. Indolent course; predominant amnestic syndrome for >= 2 years	X	Y
5. Age generally > 75 years old	X	Y
II. Required imaging for Probable LATE		
Significant hippocampal atrophy (out of proportion to global atrophy)	XX	YY
III. Required supportive features for Probable LATE		
A negative test of one of the following to rule out Ab-amyloidosis: Amyloid PET or biofluid indicator of Ab positivity	XX (must be negative)	N/A
IV. Additional supportive neuroimaging features:		
1. Characteristic FDG PET pattern without the stereotypical posterior temporo-parietal hypometabolism seen in AD or FTLD pattern	X	Y
2. Structural MTL changes suggestive of LATE (severe atrophy particularly hippocampal head and anterior ERC/PRC; elevated inferior temporal/MTL ratio)	X	Y
V. Possible LATE with concomitant biomarker-indicated ADNC (i.e. LATE with Ab amyloid and tau): Core clinical syndrome		
1. Progressive amnestic, multi-domain syndrome; memory loss may LATE be particularly severe relative to other cognitive domains	N/A	Z
2. Generally, more rapid course than typical AD alone	N/A	Z
VI. Required supportive features for Possible LATE, likely AD+LATE (at least one of the following)		
1. Severe hippocampal atrophy in the setting of no more than mildly symptomatic dementia	N/A	Need at least one of these three
2. MTL/hippocampal atrophy out of proportion to degree of tau pathologic burden measured by Tau PET	N/A	Need at least one of these three
3. FDG-PET with elevated inferior temporal/MTL ratio	N/A	Need at least one of these three

Clinical evaluation

Detailed patient history focusing on age at onset and nature and rate of decline of cognitive functions, particularly memory loss, is critical. Clinicians also assess other cognitive domains and inquire about any changes in behavior or personality that might indicate broader neurological impact. Neuropsychologic examinations include testing to assess memory, executive function, language abilities, and other cognitive functions. These tests help differentiate LATE from other neurodegenerative diseases based on the presence of primarily amnestic versus multi-domain cognitive impairments.

Photomicrographs showing brain tissue features associated with LATE-NC.

MRI scans are used to detect structural changes in the brain. In LATE, MRI may reveal severe atrophy in the medial temporal lobe, particularly in the hippocampus and amygdala, which are key areas affected by TDP-43 pathology, and may indicate hippocampal sclerosis. Other MRI abnormalities have recently been also observed in association with LATE.

PET scans can be used to detect amyloid and tau pathologies that are indicative of Alzheimer's disease. The absence of these signals may support the diagnosis of LATE by ruling out significant amyloid or tau misfolded proteins in the brain (which would in turn indicate the presence of Alzheimer's disease). FDG-PET scans may also be used to predict the presence of an underlying LATE-NC disease.

Biomarkers for neuronal damage such as tau protein and neurofilaments can be measured in the cerebrospinal fluid and blood. A lack of amyloid-beta and tau relative to the degree of cognitive impairment may suggest LATE, if typical Alzheimer's pathology is not present. Vigorous efforts are ongoing to identify specific biomarkers for TDP-43 pathology. These include potential CSF markers or blood-based biomarkers derived from advanced protein assays, which could specifically indicate the presence of abnormal TDP-43.

Pathological examination

Definitive diagnosis of LATE currently relies on post-mortem examination, in which brain tissues are examined for a specific pattern of TDP-43 proteinopathy. The distribution and severity of TDP-43 inclusions, especially in the amygdala and hippocampus (but with none or modest density of pathology in the frontal cortex), confirm the presence of LATE. The specific severity/extent of LATE-NC follows on the basic staging scheme based on a stereotypic expansion of TDP-43 pathology in the aged brain. This pattern was originally identified by Dr. Keith Josephs and colleagues, and was later corroborated by Dr. Julie Schneider and colleagues at Rush University Medical Center. For routine LATE-NC diagnosis, the pathology is staged along a 0-3 staging scheme: when TDP-43 pathology is only seen in the amygdala, that is LATE-NC Stage 1; when TDP-43 pathology is in the amygdala and hippocampus, that is LATE-NC Stage 2; and, when TDP-43 pathology is in amygdala, hippocampus, and middle frontal gyrus, that is LATE-NC Stage 3.

== Prognosis ==
The prognosis of LATE varies significantly depending on several factors including the age at onset, stage of the disease at diagnosis, the presence and degree of cerebrovascular disease and of other comorbidities (particularly whether Alzheimer's disease pathology is also present), and individual patient factors. Understanding the progression, expected outcomes, and influencing factors is crucial for managing LATE effectively and providing appropriate support to affected individuals and their families.

Pure LATE typically manifests as a slow, progressive decline in memory and other cognitive functions, which distinguishes it from more rapidly progressing forms of dementia. However, the rate of progression can vary widely among individuals. Early stages may involve subtle memory impairments that gradually worsen. As LATE progresses, patients may experience more significant memory loss and eventually exhibit symptoms affecting other cognitive domains, although the primary impairment usually remains in memory. Progression to more severe dementia is common, and as with many forms of dementia, individuals with LATE gradually require more assistance with daily activities, leading to significant dependency on caregivers.

== Epidemiology ==
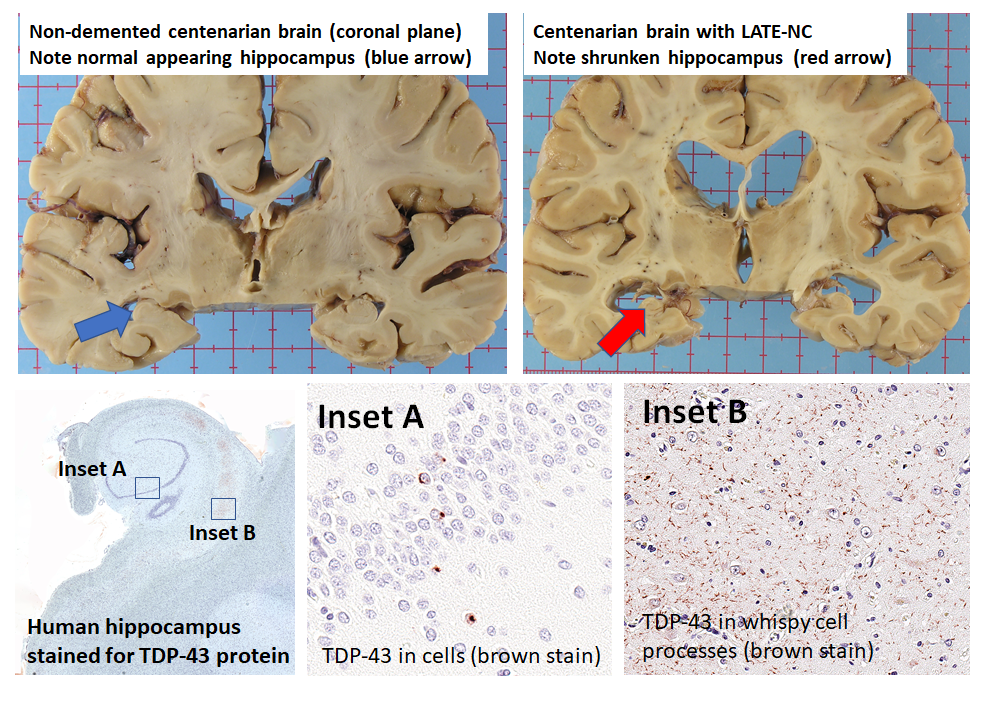
LATE neuropathologic changes (LATE-NC). A normal centenarian brain, cut in the coronal plane (top left) is compared to a brain with LATE-NC (top right). The hippocampi on both sides are atrophic (shrunken) in the brain with LATE-NC. The bottom 3 panels show photomicrographs of a hippocampus with LATE-NC, stained for phosphorylated TDP-43 protein (TDP-43). Insets show TDP-43 positive neuronal cytoplasmic inclusions (Inset A--in dentate granule cells) and wispy non-tapering cellular processes stained for TDP-43 protein (Inset B--in CA1).

LATE is an increasingly recognized neurodegenerative condition and LATE neuropathological changes are present in >30% of individuals older than 85 years, making it one of the more common dementia-associated conditions in the elderly. LATE often coexists with other common brain pathologies of aging, such as Alzheimer's disease and/or cerebrovascular disorder. The risk of developing LATE increases with age, being unusual in individuals under 65 and increasingly common in those over 80. Studies have not shown consistent differences between males and females in the prevalence of LATE. Several high-quality autopsy cohorts evaluating the "oldest-old" (>90yrs at death) have found that the correlative impact of LATE-NC on dementia rivals or exceeds that of Alzheimer's pathology in that age group. Limited data are available on the prevalence of LATE across different ethnic and racial groups. Initial studies have not indicated significant differences in prevalence based on race or ethnicity. However, LATE has been identified in all the populations for which it has been evaluated, in studies around the world. The recognition and reporting of LATE may vary depending on the local healthcare system's capacity to diagnose and record cases of dementia, particularly in settings where detailed neuropathological examinations are less common. Understanding the true epidemiological impact of LATE is essential for planning of research, healthcare, and resource allocation, especially as people age.

== History ==
The pathological signatures of the disorder now known as LATE have been observed at least since the mid-1990s, but attention on the TDP-43 protein that is part of its mechanism have been relatively recent.

The phenomenon of hippocampal sclerosis-linked dementia, as well as the link to TDP-43, were first described by Dr. Dennis Dickson and colleagues, and this clinical-pathologic entity was subsequently confirmed by many others. However, brain changes diagnosable as "hippocampal sclerosis" are also seen in other diseases (such as epilepsy), and many LATE-NC brains lack full-blown hippocampal sclerosis, so, hippocampal sclerosis is neither a sensitive nor specific feature of LATE-NC. TDP-43 proteinopathy itself (a disease-associated phenomenon discovered by Dr. Manuela Neumann and colleagues at UPENN in the Drs John Trojanowski/Virginia Lee CNDR Lab) is also implicated in frontotemporal lobar degeneration (FTLD), amyotrophic lateral sclerosis (ALS), and other diseases.

It was not until the late 2000s and early 2010s that researchers began to recognize a pattern of TDP-43 pathology that was distinct from ALS and FTLD in elderly individuals, often co-existing with but distinct from Alzheimer's disease pathology. A milestone in the history of LATE was the publication of a consensus report in 2019 by an international group of experts. This report formally recognized LATE as a distinct disease entity, described its neuropathological criteria, and provided a consensus description of clinical relevance. Thus, LATE was distinguished from other memory disorders of aging, and from other TDP-43 proteinopathies, and provided a universal terminology as required to facilitate communication (and raise awareness) among clinicians and researchers. There has been some debate and discussion as to optimal nomenclature for this condition.
