= APC2 =

Identifiers
- Aliases: APC2, APCL, adenomatosis polyposis coli 2, WNT signaling pathway regulator, APC regulator of WNT signaling pathway 2, MRT74
- External IDs: OMIM: 612034; MGI: 1346052; GeneCards: APC2
Available structures
PDB	Ortholog search: PDBe RCSB
PDB	List of PDB id codes 1DEB, 1EMU, 1JPP, 1M5I, 1T08, 1TH1, 1V18, 2RQU, 3AU3, 3NMW, 3NMX, 3NMZ, 3QHE, 3RL7, 3RL8, 3T7U, 4G69

Gene location (Human)
Chr.	Chromosome 19 (human)
Band	19p13.3	Start	1,446,302 bp
Band	19p13.3	End	1,473,244 bp

Gene location (Mouse)
Chr.	Chromosome 10 (mouse)
Band	10|10 C1	Start	80,131,811 bp
Band	10|10 C1	End	80,154,097 bp
RNA expression pattern
Bgee	Human / Mouse (ortholog); Top expressed in: paraflocculus of cerebellum; cerebellar vermis; middle frontal gyrus; Brodmann area 10; inferior olivary nucleus; ganglionic eminence; frontal pole; ventral tegmental area; dorsal motor nucleus of vagus nerve; inferior ganglion of vagus nerve / Top expressed in: ganglionic eminence; dentate gyrus of hippocampal formation granule cell; superior frontal gyrus; neural tube; lumbar subsegment of spinal cord; primary visual cortex; Rostral migratory stream; cerebellar cortex; perirhinal cortex; entorhinal cortex; More reference expression data
BioGPS	n/a
Gene ontology
Molecular function	beta-catenin binding; microtubule binding; protein binding; gamma-catenin binding
Cellular component	cytoplasm; Golgi apparatus; microtubule cytoskeleton; actin filament; perinuclear region of cytoplasm; cytoplasmic microtubule; catenin complex; microtubule; cytoskeleton; lamellipodium membrane; filamentous actin; cytosol; midbody; intercellular bridge; beta-catenin destruction complex; postsynapse
Biological process	negative regulation of Wnt signaling pathway; Wnt signaling pathway; negative regulation of canonical Wnt signaling pathway; microtubule cytoskeleton organization; activation of GTPase activity; cell fate specification; negative regulation of microtubule depolymerization; pattern specification process; cell migration; regulation of cell differentiation; positive regulation of protein catabolic process
Sources:Amigo / QuickGO
Orthologs
Databases	NCBI: entry; OMA: entry
Species	Human	Mouse
Entrez	10297	23805
Ensembl	ENSG00000115266	ENSMUSG00000020135
UniProt	O95996	Q9Z1K7
RefSeq (mRNA)	NM_005883; NM_001351273	NM_011789; NM_001372237; NM_001372238; NM_001372239; NM_001372240 NM_001372241
RefSeq (protein)	NP_005874; NP_001338202	n/a
Location (UCSC)	Chr 19: 1.45 – 1.47 Mb	Chr 10: 80.13 – 80.15 Mb
PubMed search
- Wikidata
View/Edit Human	View/Edit Mouse

Adenomatous polyposis coli protein 2 is a protein that in humans is encoded by the APC2 gene. This is a dual-functional protein which is especially prevalant in the developing brain, and involved in cell signaling (specifically Wnt signaling) and stabilizing the cytoskeleton.

== Function ==
=== Wnt signaling ===
Frizzled receptors are a type of cell receptor involved in a variety of functions including embryonic development and cell proliferation. These receptors trigger a cascade of reactions called the Wnt signaling pathway that eventually leads to interaction with the DNA via the protein beta-catenin, which affects which proteins get produced by the cell. The APC2 protein promotes the formation of a protein complex which is involved in breaking down the protein beta-catenin.

=== Cytoskeleton ===
The APC2 protein stabilizes microtubules, which are part of the cell cytoskeleton. It may also be involved in the regulation of actin fibers my means of GTPase activation (specifically the Rho family).

== Medical Significance ==
Pathogenic mutations the APC2 gene have been associated with brain disorders, and in particular it is the cause of two disorders called complex cortical dysplasia, with other brain malformations 10 and intellectual developmental disorder, autosomal recessive 74.

== See also ==
- Adenomatous polyposis coli
