= Fluid-attenuated inversion recovery =

Medical imaging technique

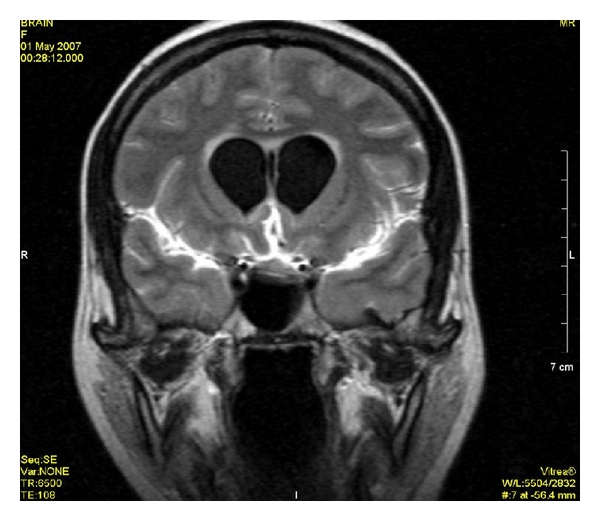
Postcontrast FLAIR of a case of meningitis. It shows hyperintensity of meninges at the tentorium and in the parietal region, with evidence of dilated ventricles.

Fluid-attenuated inversion recovery (FLAIR) is a magnetic resonance imaging sequence with an inversion recovery set to null fluids. For example, it can be used in brain imaging to suppress cerebrospinal fluid (CSF) effects on the image, so as to bring out the periventricular hyperintense lesions, such as multiple sclerosis (MS) plaques. It was invented by Graeme Bydder, Joseph Hajnal, and Ian Young in the early 1990s. FLAIR can be used with both three-dimensional imaging (3D FLAIR) or two dimensional imaging (2D FLAIR).

== Technique ==
By carefully choosing the inversion time (TI), the signal from any particular tissue can be nulled. The appropriate TI depends on the tissue via the formula:

$$\textrm{TI} = \ln(2) \cdot T_1$$

In other words, one should typically use a TI of around 70% of the T_{1} value. In the case of CSF suppression, the long TI (inversion time) is adjusted to a zero crossing point for water (none of its signal is visible), so the signal of the CSF is theoretically "erased" from the image.

The standard T_{2} variant of FLAIR uses a long TE to develop T_{2}-weighting and a long repetition time (TR) to increase signal to noise ratio (SNR), while the T_{1} variant of FLAIR uses a short echo time (TE) and short TR to develop T_{1}-weighting. The TR also controls the SNR efficiency of the scan, which is optimal only for a particular T_{1}.

== Clinical applications ==
The FLAIR sequence analysis has been especially useful in the evaluation and study of CNS disorders, involving:

- Lacunar infarction
- Multiple sclerosis (MS) plaques
- Subarachnoid haemorrhage
- Head trauma
- Meningitis and other leptomeningeal diseases (Note: Post-contrast FLAIR images have been added to diagnosis protocol for accurate medical assessment.)
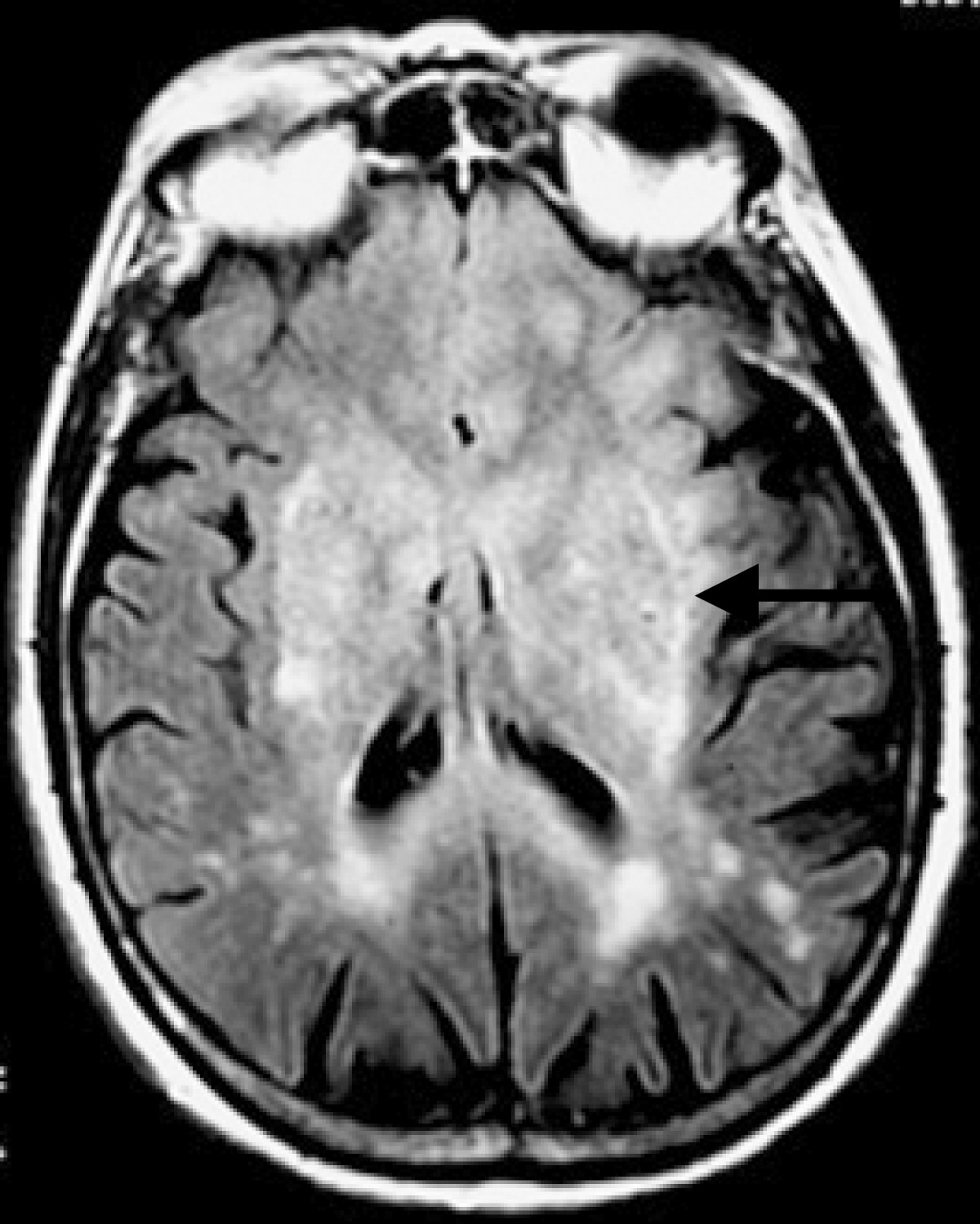
Axial fluid-attenuated inversion recovery MRI image demonstrating tumor-related infiltration involving lenticular nuclei (Arrow).

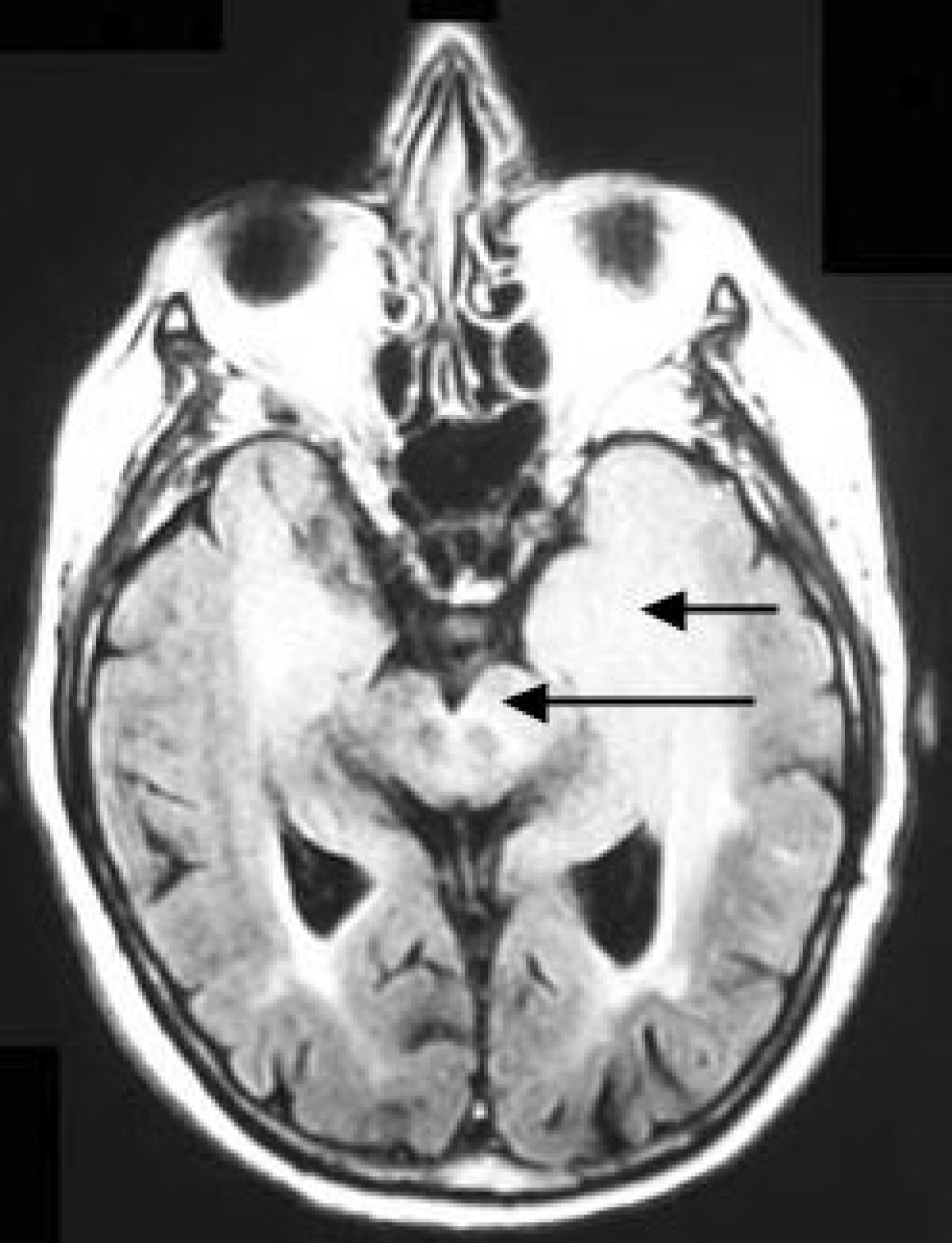
Axial fluid-attenuated inversion recovery MRI image demonstrating tumor-related infiltration involving both temporal lobes (Short arrow), and the substantia nigra (Long arrow).

== See also ==
- Relaxation (NMR)
