= Howard Feldman (neuroscientist) =

American neuroscientist

Howard H Feldman is a professor of neurosciences at the University of California, San Diego (UCSD). He was appointed director of the Alzheimer's Disease Cooperative Study (ADCS) in April 2016, a national grant-funded network and coordinating center that was established in 1991. He holds the Epstein Family Chancellor's Chair in Alzheimer's Disease Research at UC San Diego. Prior to joining UC San Diego, he was on faculty at University of British Columbia where he served as the Head of the Division of Neurology, the Director of the Alzheimer's and Related Disorders Clinic and the Executive Associate Dean for Research for the Faculty of Medicine.

== Early life and education ==
He received his MDCM degree from McGill University in Quebec, Canada in 1978. He is board certified in Neurology by the Royal College of Physicians and Surgeons of Canada. His neurology practice has focused on the subspecialty care of dementia and neurodegenerative disorders. He is licensed with the Medical Board of California.

== Career ==
Following his MDCM from McGill University, Dr. Feldman undertook his residency training in Internal Medicine and Neurology at McGill University, University of Colorado, and University of British Columbia where he also completed a fellowship with focus on amyotrophic lateral sclerosis and neuromuscular diseases. He held academic ranks at the University of British Columbia in the Division of Neurology, Department of Medicine, from clinical instructor 1991, clinical assistant and clinical associate professor with promotion to full professor in 2001.

He served as the head of a number of academic programs at UBC including its Alzheimer Clinical Trials Program, its head injury program and in 2005 its Clinic for Alzheimer's Disease and Related Disorders. He served as Head of the Division of Neurology, Department of Medicine at UBC from 2001 to 2008 before a secondment to Bristol-Meyers Squibb from 2009 to 2011 where he served as vice-president and Therapeutic Area Head of Neuroscience for Global Clinical Research and Development. He returned to UBC in 2012 where he resumed his clinical and academic activities while also serving as Executive Associate Dean of Research for UBC Faculty of Medicine. He joined UC San Diego in 2016 to take on the leadership of the Alzheimer's Disease Cooperative Study and to serve as Dean for Alzheimer's Disease and Neurodegenerative Research.

He currently holds Affiliate Faculty membership at the University of British Columbia Department of Medicine since 2016 and Professor Adjunct at Yale University School of Medicine since 2011. He served as adjunct professor at McGill University Center for Aging from 1995 till 2022.

== Research ==
He has contributed to scientific discoveries and clinical research studies focused on aging, mild cognitive impairment (MCI), Alzheimer's disease (AD), frontotemporal dementia (FTD), and diagnostic/therapeutic trials. He has led several international clinical trials in AD resulting in important original data and informing care across the continuum of the disease. In the field of frontotemporal dementia, he has contributed to the discoveries of the progranulin and C9ORF72 genetic mutations as well as to the elucidation of TDP43.

His research focuses on the epidemiology, natural history and experimental therapeutics of Alzheimer's disease and dementia within an approach that includes longitudinal observational cohort studies in clinical and population samples, disease modelling, clinical pathological correlative studies and clinical trials across the spectrum of preclinical to most severe dementia stages. These interests have included the development of novel diagnostic criteria for Alzheimer's disease.

He contributed to the discoveries of the progranulin and C9ORF72 genetic mutations which cause FTD and FTD with motor neuron disease.

=== Industry experience ===
From 2009 to2011, he took a leave from his academic appointment at UBC to take on a senior leadership role as therapeutic area head for neuroscience global clinical research at Bristol-Myers Squibb, where his research focused on developing novel pharmaceutical therapies for neurodegenerative and other neurological/psychiatric disorders.

== Academic research (selected articles) ==
- Mohr E, Feldman HH, and Gauthier SG. Canadian Guidelines for the Development of Anti-dementia Therapies: A Conceptual Summary. Canadian Journal of Neurological Sciences 1995; 22: 62–71.
- Feldman HH, Gauthier S, Hecker J, Vellas B, Subbiah P, and Whalen E. A 24-Week, Randomized, Double-Blind Study of Donepezil in Moderate to Severe Alzheimer's Disease.
- Feldman HH, Scheltens P, Scarpini E, Herrmann N, Mesenbrink P, Mancione L, Tekin S, Lane R, and Ferris S. Behavioral symptoms in mild cognitive impairment: Findings from the InDDEx Study.
- Feldman HH, Ferris S, Winblad B, Sfikas N, Mancione L, He Y, Tekin S, Burns A, Cummings J, Del Ser T, Inzitari D, Orgogozo JM, Sauer H, Scheltens P, Scarpini E, Herrmann N, Farlow M, Potkin S, Charles HC, Fox NC, Lane R. Effect of rivastigmine on delay to diagnosis of Alzheimer's disease from mild cognitive impairment: The InDDEx study.
- Coric V, Salloway S, van Dyck CH, Dubois B, Andreasen N, Brody M, Curtis C, Soininen H, Thein S, Shiovitz T, Pilcher G, Ferris S, Colby S, Kerselaers W, Dockens R, Soares H, Kaplita S, Luo F, Pachai C, Bracoud L, Mintun M, Grill J, Marek K, Seibyl J, Cedarbaum JM, Albright C, HH Feldman, Berman RM. Targeting Prodromal Alzheimer Disease with Avagacestat: A Randomized Clinical Trial.
- Schneider LS, Thomas RG, Hendrix S, Rissman RA, Brewer JB, Salmon DP, Oltersdorf T, Okuda T, and Feldman HH, Alzheimer's Disease Cooperative Study TCAD Group: The safety and efficacy of edonerpic maleate (T-817MA) in patients with mild to moderate Alzheimer's disease. JAMA Neurology.
- Matthews DC, Ritter A, Thomas RG, Andrews RD, Lukic AS, Revta C, Kinney JW, Tousi B, Leverenz JB, Fillit H, Zhong K, Feldman HH, Cummings J. Rasagiline effects on glucose metabolism, cognition, and tau in Alzheimer's dementia.
- Rafii M, Sol O, Mobley WC, Delpretti S, Skotko BG...Feldman HH. A Phase 1b Multi Center, Double Blind, Randomized, Placebo Controlled Dose Escalation Study of the Safety, Tolerability, and Immunogenicity of ACI-24 in Adults with Down syndrome.
- Feldman HH, Luchsinger JA, Léger GC, Taylor C, Jacobs DM, Salmon DP, Edland SD, Messer K, Revta C, Flowers SA, Jones KS, Koulman A, Yarasheski KE, Verghese PB, Venkatesh V, Zetterberg H, Durant J, Lupo JL, Gibson GE; ADCS BenfoTeam Study Group. Protocol for a seamless phase 2A-phase 2B randomized double-blind placebo-controlled trial to evaluate the safety and efficacy of benfotiamine in patients with early Alzheimer's disease (BenfoTeam).5.

== Awards and honors ==
- McGill University Medical School: University Scholar (1978)
- Martin M Hoffman Award for Excellence in Research from the University of British Columbia in 1997.
- Vancouver Hospital Medical Staff: Academic Award for Scientific Achievement (2001)
- Best Doctors (Canada) (2005–2006, 2007–2008)
- Vancouver Acute Medical Staff Award: For Bringing Clinical Renown to Vancouver Acute (2007)
- Profile in Lancet Neurology: Howard Feldman "Master of Dementia" (2007)
- Ralph Fisher and Alzheimer Society of BC Endowed Professorship in Alzheimer's Research (2007–2016)
- Elected Fellow of the Canadian Academy of Health Sciences (2008–present)
- Elected Fellow of the American Academy of Neurology (2008–present)
- Most Highly Cited Researchers in Neuroscience & Behavior; World's Most Influential Scientific Mind from Thomson Reuters in 2002 - 2012.
- Top 1% Most Cited Researcher in Neuroscience from Web of Science Clarivate Analytics in 2007 - 2018.
- Distinguished Achievement Award for Outstanding Contribution by a Senior Faculty Member from the University of British Columbia in 2008.
- Most Highly Cited Researchers in Neuroscience & Behavior; World's Most Influential Scientific Mind from Thomson Reuters in 2014 - 2015
- Irma M Parhad Award for Excellence from the Canadian Consortium of Clinical Cognitive Centres for Research (C5R) in 2013.
- #1 ranking PI in Neurosciences funding from the NIH from the Blue Ridge Institute for Medical Research in 2019.

== Bibliography ==
=== Books ===
- Feldman, HH. (2007). Atlas of Alzheimer's Disease (1st ed.). CRC Press.

== Selected publications ==
- Albert MS, DeKosky ST, Dickson D, Dubois B, Feldman HH, Fox NC, Gamst A, Holtzman DM, Jagust WJ, Petersen RC, Snyder PJ, Carrillo M, Thies B, Phelps CH: The Diagnosis of Mild Cognitive Impairment Due to Alzheimer's Disease: Recommendations from the National Institute of Aging and Alzheimer Association Workgroup.
- McKeith I, Boeve B, Dickson D, Halliday G, Taylor J-P, Weintraub D, Arsland D, Galvin J, Attems J, Ballart C, Bayston A, Beach T, Blanc F, Bohnen N, Bonanni L, Bras J, Brundin P, Burn D, Chen-Plotkin A, Duda J, El-Agnaf O, Feldman HH, Kosaka K: Diagnosis and Management of Dementia with Lewy Bodies: Fourth Consensus Report of the DLB Consortium.
- Neumann M, Sampathu DM, Kwong LK, Truax AC, Miscenyi MC, Chou TT, Bruce J, Schuck T, Grossman M, Clark C, McKlusky L, Miller BL, Masliah E, Mackenzie IR, Feldman HH, Feiden W, Kretzschmar HA, Trojanowski JQ, and Lee VM-Y. Ubiquitinated TDP-43 in frontotemporal lobar degeneration and amyotrophic lateral sclerosis.
- Dubois B*, Feldman HH*, Jacova C, Dekosky ST, Barberger-Gateau P, Cummings J, Delacourte A, Galasko D, Gauthier S, Jicha G, Meguro K, Morris J, O'Brien J, Pasquier F, Robert P, Rossor M, Salloway S, Stern Y, Visser PJ, Scheltens P. Research criteria for the diagnosis of Alzheimer's disease: Revising of the NINCDS-ADRDA criteria.
- DeJesus-Hernandez M, Mackenzie IR, Boeve BF, Boxer AL, Baker M, Rutherford NJ, Nicholson AM, Finch AN, Flynn H, Adamson J, Kouri N, Wojtas A, Sengdy P, Hsiung GY, Karydas A, Seeley WW, Josephs KA, Coppola G, Geschwind DH, Wszolek ZK, Feldman HH, Knopman DS, Petersen RC, Miller BL, Dickson DW, Boylan KB, Graff-Radford NR, Rademakers R: Expanded GGGGCC Hexanucleotide Repeat in Noncoding Region of C9ORF72 Causes Chromosome 9p-Linked FTD and ALS.
- Gauthier S, Reisberg B, Zaudig M, Peterson R, Ritchie K, Broich K, Belleville S, Brodaty H, Bennett D, Chertkow H, Cummings JL, Feldman HH, Ganguli M, Hampel H, Scheltens P, Tierney M, Whitehouse P, and Winblad B, on behalf of the participants of the IPA Conference on MCI. Mild Cognitive Impairment.
- Dubois B, Feldman HH, Jacova C, Hampel H, Molinuevo JL, Blennow K, DeKosky ST, Gauthier S, Selkoe D, Bateman R, Cappa S, Crutch S, Engelborghs S, Frisoni GB, Fox NC, Galasko D, Habert MO, Jicha GA, Nordberg A, Pasquier F, Rabinovici G, Robert P, Rowe C, Salloway S, Sarazin M, deSouza LC, Vellas B, Visser PJ, Schneider L, Stern Y, Scheltens P, Cummings JL. Advancing research diagnostic criteria for Alzheimer's disease: the IWG-2 criteria.
- Dubois B*, Feldman HH*, Jacova C, Cummings J, DeKosky ST, Barberger Gateau P. Delacourte A, Frisoni G, Fox NC, Galasko D, Gauthier S. Hampel H. Jicha GA, Meguro K, O'Brien J, Pasquier, Robert P, Rossor M, Salloway S, Sarazin M, deSouza LC, Stern Y. Visser PJ and Scheltens P. Revising the Definition of Alzheimer's Disease: A new lexicon Lancet Neurology.
- Baker M, Mackenzie IR, Pickering Brown SM, Gass J, Rademaker R, Lindholm C, Snowden J, Adamson J, Sadovnick AD, Rollinson S, Cannon A, Dwosh E, Neary D, Melquist S, Richardson A, Dickson D, Berger Z, Eriksen J, Robinson T, Zehr C, Dickey CA, Crook R, McGowan E, Mann D, Boeve B, Feldman HH, Hutton M. Mutations in Progranulin cause tau-negative frontotemporal dementia linked to chromosome 17.
- Winblad B, Amouyel P, Andreiu S, Ballard C, Brayne C, Brodaty H, Cedazo-Minguez A, Dubois B, Evardsson D,

Feldman HH, Fratiglioni L, Frisoni GB, Gauthier S, Georges J, Graff C, Iqbal K, Jessen F, Johansson G, Jönsson L, Kivepelto M, Knapp M, Mangialasche F, Melis R, Nordberg A, Rikkert MO, Qiu C, Sakmar TP, Scheltens P, Schneider LS, Sperling R, Tjernberg LO, Waldemar G, Wimo A, Zetterberg H. Defeating Alzheimer's Disease and Other Dementias: A Priority for European Science and Society.
