= Inversion recovery =

MRI sequence

Inversion recovery is a magnetic resonance imaging sequence that provides high contrast between tissue and lesion. It can be used to provide high T_{1} weighted image, high T_{2} weighted image, and to suppress the signals from fat, blood, or cerebrospinal fluid.

== Fluid-attenuated inversion recovery ==
Fluid-attenuated inversion recovery (FLAIR) is an inversion-recovery pulse sequence used to nullify the signal from fluids. For example, it can be used in brain imaging to suppress cerebrospinal fluid so as to bring out periventricular hyperintense lesions, such as multiple sclerosis plaques. By carefully choosing the inversion time TI (the time between the inversion and excitation pulses), the signal from any particular tissue can be suppressed.

== Turbo inversion recovery magnitude ==
Turbo inversion recovery magnitude (TIRM) measures only the magnitude of a turbo spin echo after a preceding inversion pulse, thus is phase insensitive.

TIRM is superior in the assessment of osteomyelitis and in suspected head and neck cancer. Osteomyelitis appears as high intensity areas. In head and neck cancers, TIRM has been found to both give high signal in tumor mass, as well as low degree of overestimation of tumor size by reactive inflammatory changes in the surrounding tissues.

== Double inversion recovery ==
Double inversion recovery is a sequence that suppresses both cerebrospinal fluid and white matter, and samples the remaining transverse magnetisation in fast spin echo, where the majority of the signals are from the grey matter. Thus, this sequence is useful in detecting small changes on the brain cortex such as focal cortical dysplasia and hippocampal sclerosis in those with epilepsy. These lesions are difficult to detect in other MRI sequences.

== Efficiency ==
The tissue or fluid to suppress (e.g., cerebrospinal fluid) and the tissue of interest (e.g. white/gray matter) typically have very different T_{1} values, e.g. T_{1} = 4000 ms and T_{1} = 920 ms. Maximizing the signal from the tissue of interest while maintaining suppression of the tissue to suppress leads to optimal expressions for the sequence timing parameters. In the example used (FLAIR) these are TI = 1710 ms and TR = 4759 ms.

In certain uses of inversion recovery, the tissue of interest and tissue to suppress are the same, e.g. at tissue boundaries, in which case the optimal timing parameters are TR = 3.57T_{1} and TI = 0.67T_{1}.

== History ==
Erwin Hahn first used inversion recovery technique to determine the value of T_{1} (the time taken for longitudinal magnetisation to recover 63% of its maximum value) for water in 1949, 3 years after the nuclear magnetic resonance was discovered.
