= Gray matter heterotopia =

Group of neurological disorders

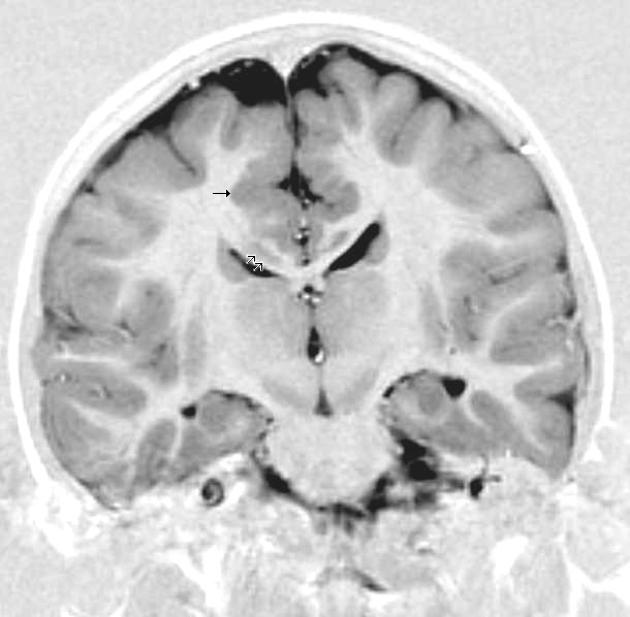
MRI of a child experiencing seizures. There are small foci of grey matter heterotopia in the corpus callosum, deep to the dysplastic cortex. (double arrows)

Gray matter heterotopia is a neurological disorder caused by gray matter being located in an atypical location in the brain.

Grey matter heterotopia is characterized as a type of focal cortical dysplasia. The neurons in heterotopia are otherwise healthy; nuclear studies have shown glucose metabolism equal to that of normally positioned gray matter. The condition causes a variety of symptoms, but usually includes some degree of epilepsy or recurring seizures, and often affects the brain's ability to function.

Symptoms vary in severity; the condition is occasionally discovered as an incidentaloma when brain imaging performed for an unrelated problem and has no apparent ill effect on the patient. In other cases, heterotopia can result in severe seizure disorders, loss of motor skills, and intellectual disability.

== Background ==
During fetal development, neural matter originates in the outer, ectodermic layer of the gastrula; thus, it originates from the cell layer primarily responsible for skin, hair, nails, etc., rather than from the layers that develop into other internal organs. The nervous system originates as a tiny, simple open tube called the neural tube; the front of this tube develops into the brain (and retinas of the eye), while the spinal cord develops from the very back end.

Neurons begin to form early, but most of them become structural rather than active nerve cells. The brain generally forms from the inside-out, especially in the case of the neocortex. Due to the nature of the process, disruptions can result in heterotopia, as the neurons have to migrate through many layers to reach their destination. Therefore, nervous tissue develops ladders made of radial glial cells that neurons climb, through the previous layers, to reach their proper destination. Some destinations, such as the cerebral cortex, even have "placeholder" neurons that travel up the ladder to form a structure; when the final neurons germinate, they find a correct placeholder and then the placeholder cell dies.

The complexity of neural development makes it fraught with opportunities for error. Grey matter heterotopia is such an example. It is believed that gray matter heterotopia are caused by an interruption in the migration of neurons to the cerebral cortex.

== Types ==
Gray matter heterotopia are common malformations of cortical development known as neuronal migration disorders. Heterotopias are classed in two groups: nodular and diffuse. Nodular types are subependymal and subcortical; diffuse types are termed band heterotopias. Affected patients are generally divided into three groups, depending on the location of the formation: subependymal, subcortical, and band heterotopia. In addition, especially with heterotopia that are genetically linked, there are sex differences. Men seem to develop more severe symptoms than women with similar formations.

Band heterotopia, a form of the condition (also known as double cortex syndrome), is seen exclusively in women; men with a mutation of the related gene (called XLIS or DCX) usually die in utero or have a much more severe brain anomaly. Symptoms in affected women vary from normal to severe developmental delay or intellectual disability; the severity of the syndrome is related to the thickness of the band of arrested neurons. Nearly all affected patients that come to medical attention have epilepsy, with partial complex and atypical absence epilepsy being the most common syndromes. Some of the more severely affected patients develop drop attacks.

=== Periventricular or subependymal ===
Periventricular means beside the ventricle, while subependymal (also spelled subepydymal) means beneath the ependyma; because the ependyma is the thin epithelial sheet lining the ventricles of the brain, these two terms are used to define heterotopia occurring directly next to a ventricle. This is by far the most common location for heterotopia. Patients with isolated subependymal heterotopia usually present with a seizure disorder in the second decade of life.

Subependymal heterotopia present in a wide array of variations. They can be a small single node or a large number of nodes, can exist on either or both sides of the brain at any point along the higher ventricle margins, can be small or large, single or multiple, and can form a small node or a large wavy or curved mass.

Symptomatic women with subependymal heterotopia typically present with partial epilepsy during the second decade of life; development and neurologic examinations up to that point are typically normal. Symptoms in men with subependymal heterotopia vary, depending on whether their disease is linked to their X-chromosome. Men with the X-linked form more commonly have associated anomalies, which can be neurological or more widespread, and they usually suffer from developmental problems. Otherwise (i.e., in non-X-linked cases) the symptomology is similar in both sexes.

=== Focal subcortical ===
Subcortical heterotopia form as distinct nodes in the white matter, "focal" indicating specific area. In general, patients present fixed neurologic deficits and develop partial epilepsy between the ages of 6 and 10. The more extensive the subcortical heterotopia, the greater the deficit; bilateral heterotopia are almost invariably associated with severe developmental delay or intellectual disability. The cortex itself often has an absence of gray matter and may be unusually thin or lack deep sulci. Subependymal heterotopia are frequently accompanied by other structural abnormalities, including an overall decrease in cortical mass. Patients with focal subcortical heterotopia have a variable motor and intellectual disturbance depending on the size and site of the heterotopion.

== Diagnosis ==
Detection of heterotopia generally occurs when a patient receives brain imaging—usually an MRI or CT scan—to diagnose seizures that are resistant to medication. Correct diagnosis requires a high degree of radiological skill, due to the heterotopia's resemblance to other masses in the brain.

== Treatment ==
When seizures are present in any forms of cortical dysplasia, they are resistant to medication. Frontal lobe resection provides significant relief from seizures to a minority of patients with periventricular lesions.

== Prognosis ==
In general, gray matter heterotopia is fixed in both its occurrence and symptoms; that is, once symptoms occur, it does not tend to progress. Varying results from surgical resection of the affected area have been reported. Although such surgery cannot reverse developmental disabilities, it may provide full or partial relief from seizures.

Heterotopia are most commonly isolated anomalies, but may be part of a number of syndromes, including chromosomal abnormalities and fetal exposure to toxins (including alcohol).
