= TMEM106B =

Protein-coding gene in humans

Identifiers
- Aliases: TMEM106B, transmembrane protein 106B, HLD16
- External IDs: OMIM: 613413; MGI: 1919150; GeneCards: TMEM106B

Gene location (Human)
Chr.	Chromosome 7 (human)
Band	7p21.3	Start	12,211,270 bp
Band	7p21.3	End	12,243,367 bp

Gene location (Mouse)
Chr.	Chromosome 6 (mouse)
Band	6|6 A1	Start	13,069,758 bp
Band	6|6 A1	End	13,089,268 bp
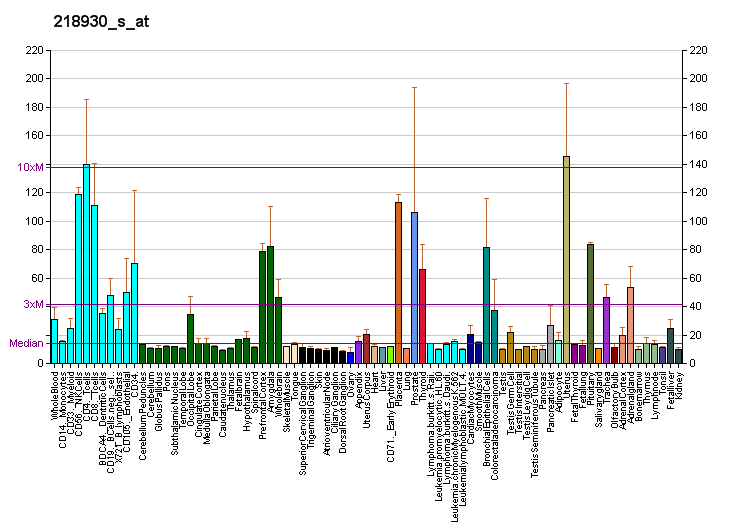
RNA expression pattern
Bgee	Human / Mouse (ortholog); Top expressed in: tail of epididymis; corpus epididymis; caput epididymis; retinal pigment epithelium; superior vestibular nucleus; internal globus pallidus; subthalamic nucleus; cerebellar vermis; seminal vesicula; palpebral conjunctiva / Top expressed in: vestibular membrane of cochlear duct; interventricular septum; Epithelium of choroid plexus; Region I of hippocampus proper; epithelium of stomach; sciatic nerve; iris; superior colliculus; gastrula; dorsal striatum; More reference expression data
BioGPS	More reference expression data
Gene ontology
Molecular function	protein binding; molecular function
Cellular component	integral component of membrane; lysosomal membrane; late endosome membrane; membrane; lysosome; endosome
Biological process	lysosome localization; dendrite morphogenesis; lysosome organization; lysosomal transport; positive regulation of dendrite development
Sources:Amigo / QuickGO
Orthologs
Databases	NCBI: entry; OMA: entry
Species	Human	Mouse
Entrez	54664	71900
Ensembl	ENSG00000106460	ENSMUSG00000029571
UniProt	Q9NUM4	Q80X71
RefSeq (mRNA)	NM_001134232; NM_018374	NM_027992
RefSeq (protein)	NP_001127704; NP_060844; NP_001127704.1; NP_060844.2	NP_082268
Location (UCSC)	Chr 7: 12.21 – 12.24 Mb	Chr 6: 13.07 – 13.09 Mb
PubMed search
- Wikidata
View/Edit Human	View/Edit Mouse

Transmembrane protein 106B is a protein that is encoded by the TMEM106B gene. It is found primarily within neurons and oligodendrocytes in the central nervous system with its subcellular location being in lysosomal membranes. TMEM106B helps facilitate important functions for maintaining a healthy lysosome, and therefore certain mutations and polymorphisms can lead to issues with proper lysosomal function. Lysosomes are in charge of clearing out mis-folded proteins and other debris, and thus, play an important role in neurodegenerative diseases that are driven by the accumulation of various mis-folded proteins and aggregates. Due to its impact on lysosomal function, TMEM106B has been investigated and found to be associated to multiple neurodegenerative diseases.

== Structure ==
=== Gene ===
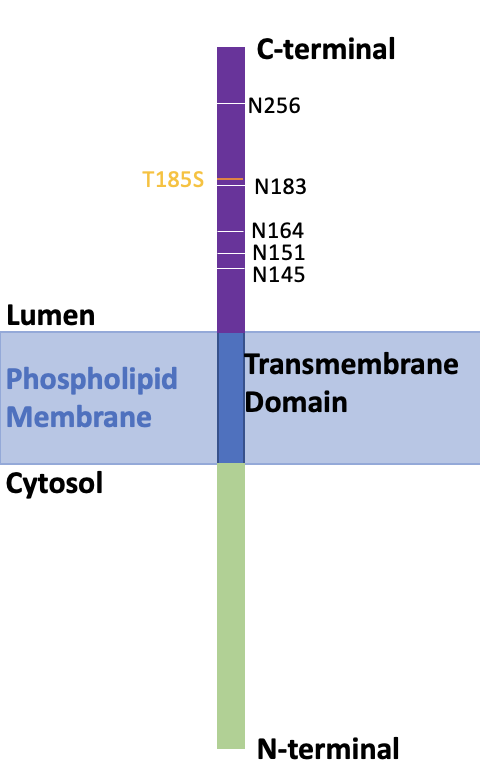
TMEM106B domains; (1) luminal C-terminal domain denoting location of the 5 glycosylation sites (N145, N151, N164, N183, and N256), as well as the site of the polymorphism T185S, (2) transmembrane domain, and (3) the cytosolic N-terminal domain.

In humans,TMEM106B is found on chromosome 7 at positions 12211270 – 12243367, totaling 32097 base pairs. The gene includes 9 exons and can give rise to two different isoforms, T185 and S185, which are formed by the risk and protective haplotypes, respectively.

=== Protein ===
TMEM106B is composed of 274 amino acids and it has a molecular weight of 31 kDa. It is found in the membrane of a lysosome (transmembrane protein) and has its highest expression in the central nervous system, specifically within neurons and oligodendrocytes. The protein can be divided into three domains: N-terminal cytosolic domain, a transmembrane domain, and a C-terminal domain containing five N-glycosylation sites in the lumen. The exact mechanism of proteolytic processing for TMEM106B is not completely understood, but a protease cleaves the protein which releases the C-terminal domain into the lumen of the lysosome and creates a N-terminal fragment on the lysosomal membrane, which is further cleaved and processed by other proteases. The mechanisms behind the proteolysis of TMEM106B is of interest because it is thought to be a factor in what gives rise to TMEM106B fibril formation.

==== Fibrils ====
TMEM106B can form amyloid fibrils in a variety of neurodegenerative diseases and in neurologically healthy individuals, which have been structurally characterized by Cryo-EM. They can be made up of a single rod-like structure or a doublet of filaments forming a twisted ribbon, of which several polymorphisms have been identified: 4 singlets and 2 doublets. There has been no clear association between any of the polymorphisms to disease. The structure of the different polymorphisms is relatively conserved in the N-terminus, core, glycosylation sites (N145, N151, N164, and N183), and a disulfide bond between C214 an C253, the difference in structure is primarily within the C-terminal region.

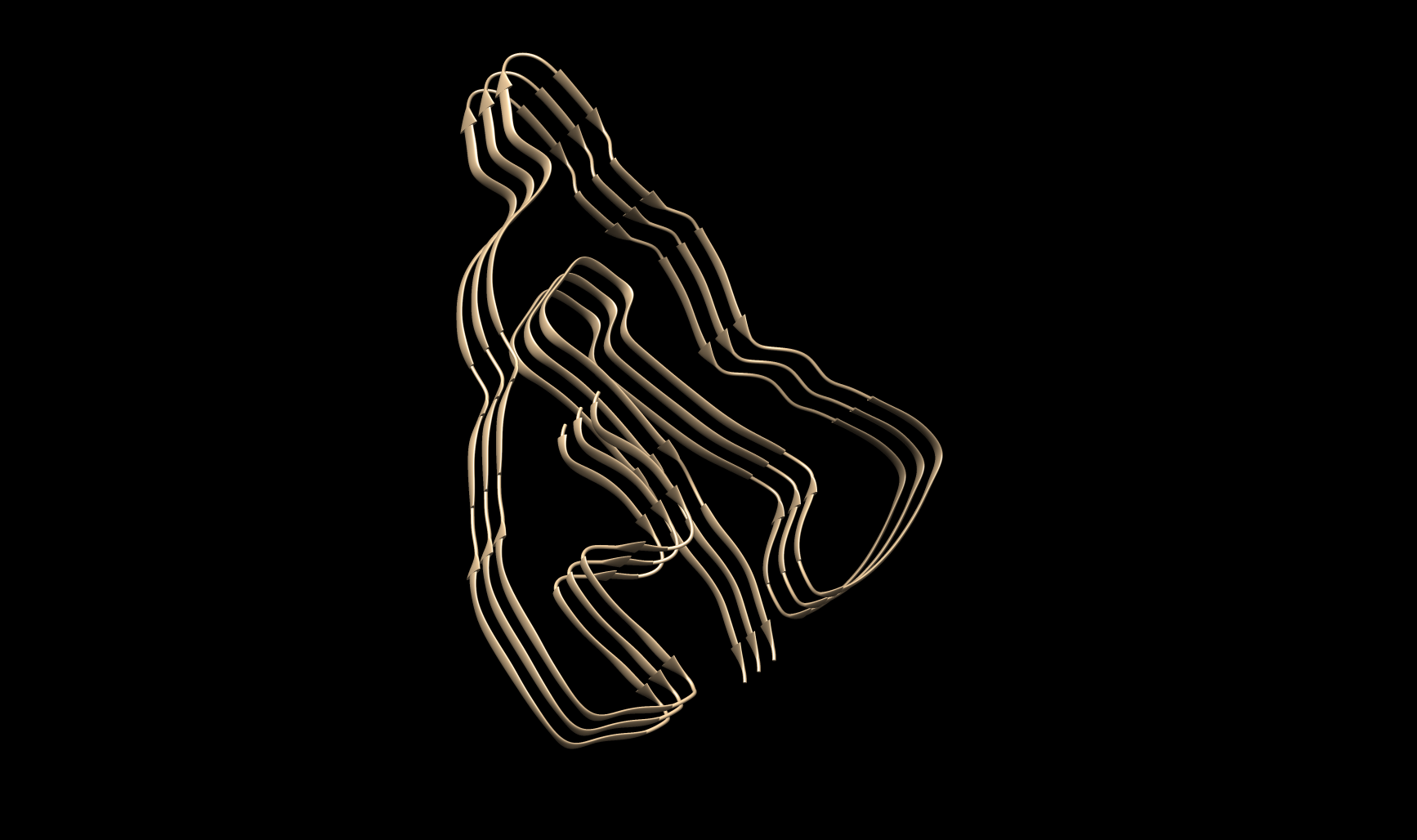
Example of a TMEM106B singlet fibril structure. Obtained from Protein Data Bank and rendered on Chimera.

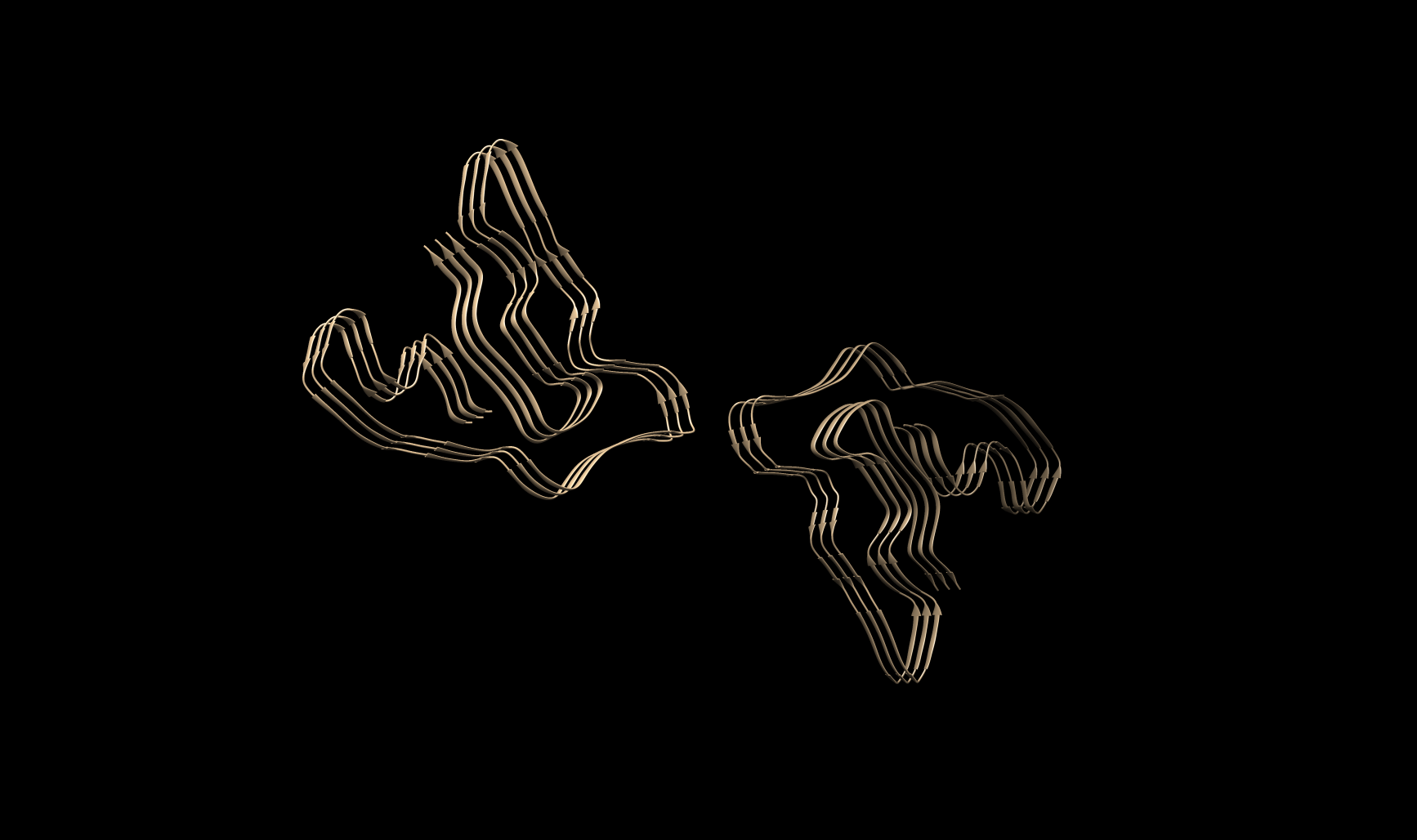
Example of a TMEM106B doublet fibril structure. Obtained from Protein Data Bank and rendered on Chimera.

== Function ==
TMEM106B is a transmembrane lysosomal protein that is involved in several key functions for the lysosome. The lysosome is the organelle that clears out debris and unnecessary proteins.

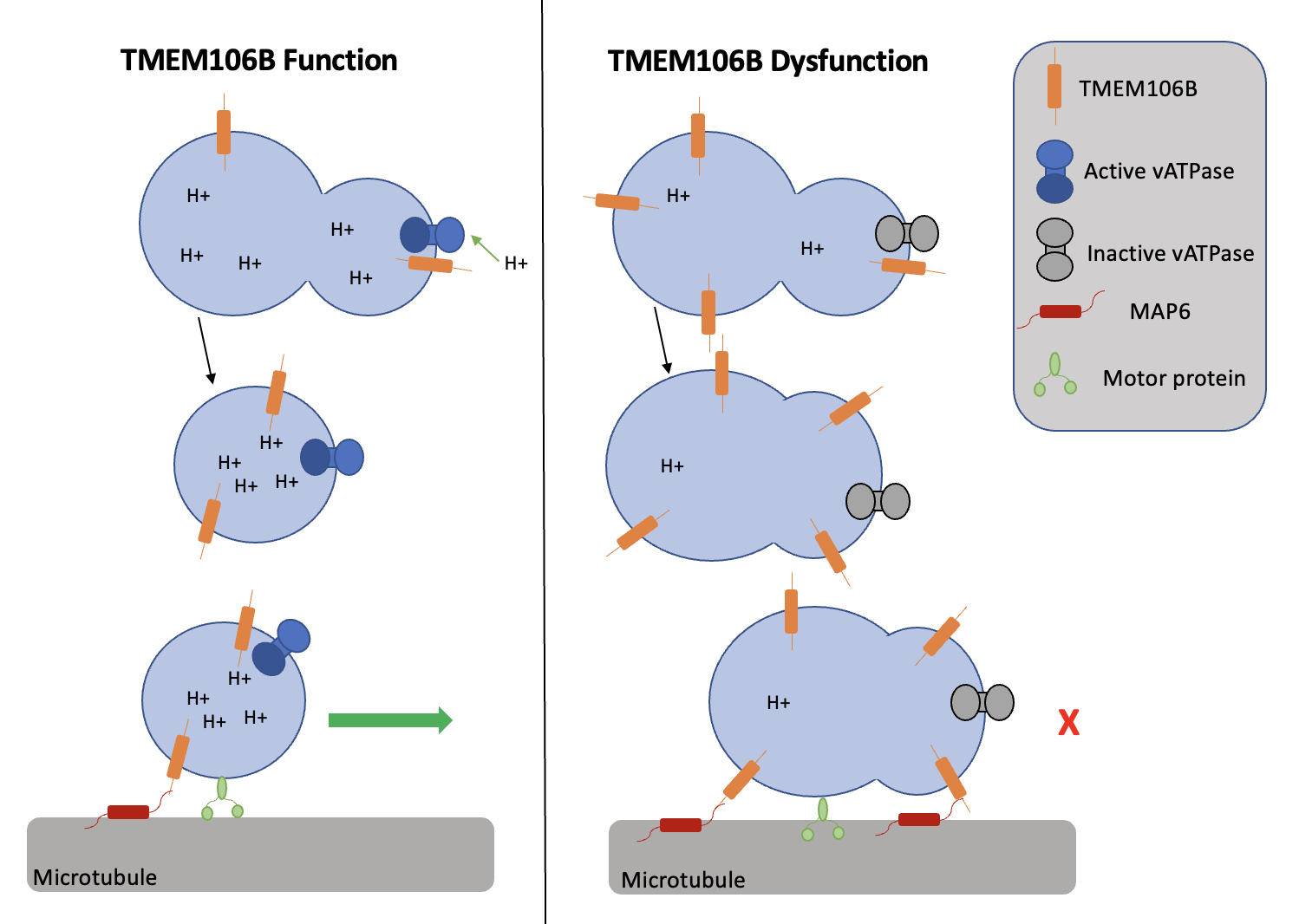
The left panel shows TMEM106B function, there is successful acidification of the lysosome through vATPase followed by correct formation of the lysosome and proper trafficking of the lysosome to the microtubule through MAP6, and the lysosome can travel down the microtubule with a motor protein. The right panel show TMEM106B dysfunction (overexpression), inactivation of the vATPase therefore loss of acidification of the lysosome, which forms a large swollen lysosome, and it binds to MAP6 and is not released which causes accumulation of TMEM106B in inappropriate areas rather than successful transport down the microtubule. This figure was adapted from Root et al. (2021).

=== Lysosomal size ===
Studies in cell lines have shown that over-expression of TMEM106B leads to larger lysosomes, which causes a negative-stress response within the cell and cell death. It is thought that lysosomal size may be partially dependent on pH and successful trafficking, as problems in either of these functions leads to clustering lysosomes and formation of large swollen vacuoles.

=== Lysosomal trafficking ===
Typically, lysosomes are trafficked along a microtubule by a motor protein and it has been observed that TMEM106B may play an important role in this process. In knock-out studies of TMEM106B inappropriate clustering of lysosomes is observed at the nucleus, and it has been shown this phenotype can be rescued by re-introducing TMEM106B into the system. In addition, it has been observed that knock-out of TMEM106B in mice leads to increased retrograde transport of lysosomes causing large lysosomal vacuoles to form at the distal end of neurons. TMEM106B has been shown to interact with microtubule associated protein 6 (MAP6), and it is thought that this interaction inhibits the retrograde transport of lysosomes, assisting with appropriate trafficking of lysosomes or inability to be transported along the microtubule by motor proteins.

=== Lysosomal pH ===
Lysosome are typically at an acidic pH of 4.5–5, maintaining this is very important to a lysosomes ability to perform degradation. Vacuolar ATPase (vATPase) maintains the acidic pH in lysosomes and it has been shown that TMEM106B interacts with accessory proteins of vATPase. When TMEM106B levels are increased a reduction in vATPase activity is observed and the lysosome is unable to maintain an acidic environment.

== Clinical implications ==
=== Frontotemporal dementia ===
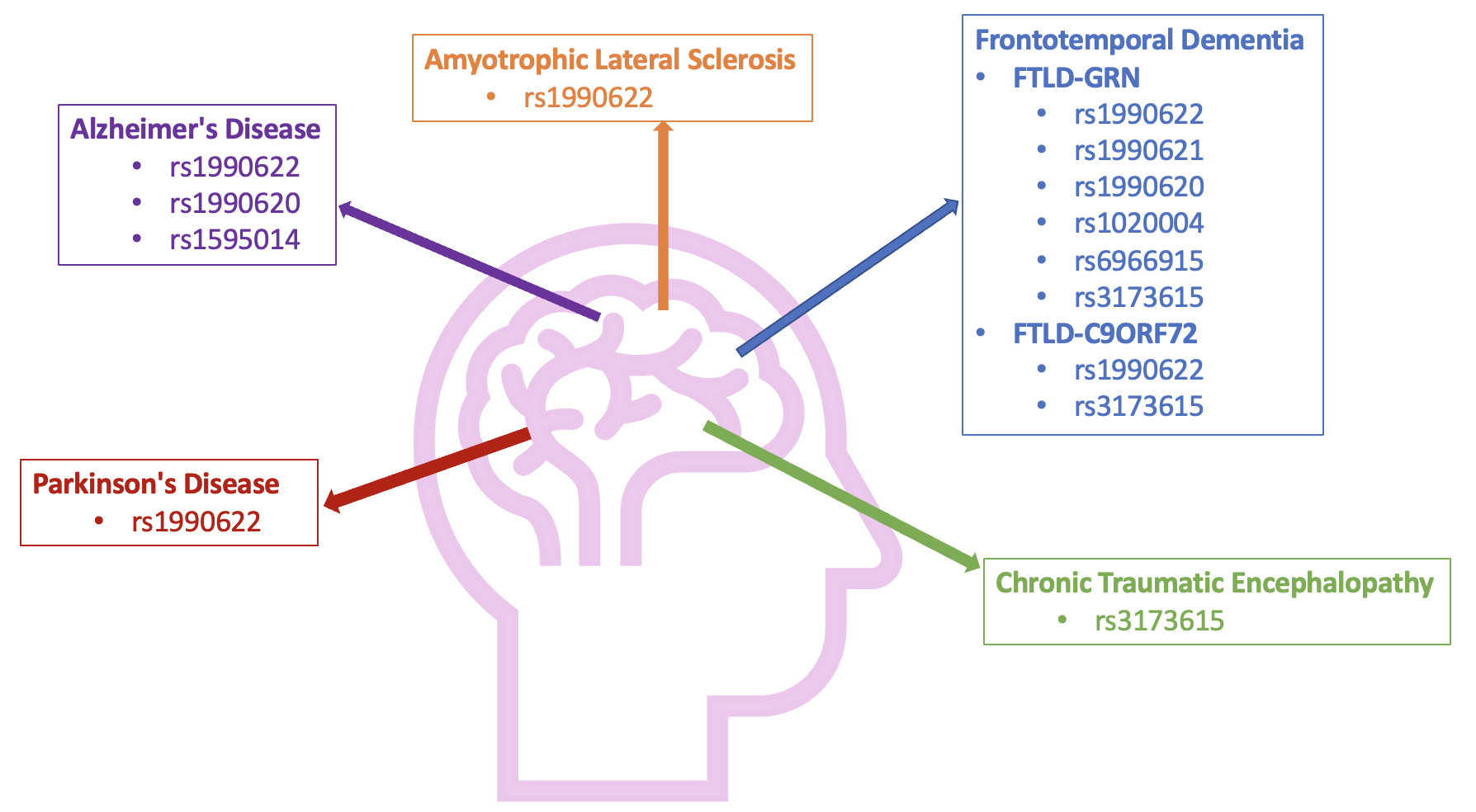
Summary of TMEM106B SNPs found to be associated with neurodegenerative diseases

Frontotemporal dementia (FTLD) is the third most common neurodegenerative disease after AD and Parkinson disease. Many patients with FTLD have aggregates containing TDP-43, an RNA binding protein. A study performed in 515 FTLD-GRN with TDP-43 inclusion cases, including 89 individuals carrying pathogenic mutations in the granulin (GRN) gene, a known cause of familial FTLD-GRN identified a single nucleotide polymorphism (SNP), rs1990622, located 6.9 kilobases downstream of the TMEM106B gene (chromosome 7p21) as a genome-wide signal. Further studies have identified other SNPs that are associated with an increased risk of FTLD-GRN, rs1990621, rs1990620, rs1020004, rs6966915 and rs3173615. In addition to increased disease risk, rs1990620 is associated with worse cognitive decline and a reduction in brain size (increase neurodegeneration) and rs19906221 has been associated with decreased neuronal proportion.

There are other forms of FTLD which are defined by their pathology or primary genetic mutations. Another subset of FTLD that has been evaluated for its association to TMEM106B are those with a C9ORF72 mutation (FTLD-C9ORF72). Two of the SNPs previously identified as risk factors for FTLD-GRN, rs1990622 and rs3173615, were found to be associated with FTLD-C9ORF72. The major allele of these SNPs were identified as a risk factor, while the minor allele was found to be protective.

=== Amyotrophic lateral sclerosis ===
Amyotrophic lateral sclerosis (ALS) is a neurodegenerative disease that causes progressive loss of motor neurons that control movement. TDP-43 aggregates and C9ORF72 mutations have been identified as important pathological and genetic markers, and therefore TMEM106B was investigated for its potential association to ALS. Surprisingly, there was no association in TMEM106B genotype to disease risk, but the minor allele of rs1990622 has been shown to be associated with preserved cognition.

=== Alzheimer's disease ===
Alzheimer's disease (AD) is the most common neurodegenerative disordered characterized by cognitive decline and dementia. TMEM106B and APOE4 polymorphisms have been found to interact and increase risk of AD. Recent genome-wide association study has found that genetic variations in TMEM106 are associated with late-onset sporadic Alzheimer's disease (LOAD). These genetic variations change the degradation pathways of misfolded protein contributing misfolded β-amyloid accumulation and plaque formation.

=== Chronic traumatic encephalopathy ===
Chronic traumatic encephalopathy (CTE) is a neurodegenerative tauopathy associated to exposure with repetitive head impacts. TMEM106B was evaluated for its association to CTE as neuroinflammation and TDP-43 pathology are common features of this disease. A SNP, rs3173615, specifically the minor allele was found to be associated with a protective phenotype in CTE cases, showing reduced phosphorylated tau and decreased neuroinflammation, but no association to TDP-43 pathology.

=== Parkinson disease ===
Parkinson's disease (PD) is the second most common neurodegenerative disease that primarily effects the motor system, but also has unique cognitive symptoms. As TMEM106B has been linked to several neurodegenerative disease, it was investigated for its association to PD and it was found to be associated with cognitive decline.

Summary table of TMEM106B SNPs and their association to neurodegenerative disease. Table was adapted from Feng et al. (2021)
Disease	SNP	Major Allele:Minor Allele	Phenotypes associated with SNP(s)
FTLD-GRN	rs1990622 rs1990621 rs1990620 rs1020004 rs6966915 rs3173615	T:C C:G A:G A:G C:T C:G	All major alleles associated with increased risk: Most significantly associated SNP, rs1990622, major allele increases odds by ~62%
FTLD-C9ORF72	rs1990622 rs3173615	T:C C:G	Major allele associated with increased risk: rs1990622 major allele increases odds by ~56%; Minor allele associated with decreased risk: rs1990622 minor allele decreases odds by ~64%
ALS	rs1990622	T:C	Minor allele associated with preserved cognition
AD	rs1990622 rs1990620 rs1595014	T:C A:G T:A	Major allele increases risk in APOE4 carriers
CTE	rs3173615	C:G	Minor allele associated with protective phenotype: Minor allele reduces odds of developing dementia by ~60%
PD	rs1990622	T:C	Major allele associated with more rapid cognitive decline

== Interactions ==
=== Progranulin and granulin ===
Progranulin (PGRN) is a glycoprotein that has been identified as another important protein for lysosomal function in neurons and microglia, particularly during aging and neurodegenerative disease. As TMEM106B has been associated with increased risk of FTLD-GRN, it was investigated for its association to PGRN and was found that the risk allele was associated to decreased levels of PGRN. Studies performed in vitro and in vivo, increasing and decreasing levels of TMEM106B, found that PGRN seems to be indirectly modulated by TMEM106B by impacting lysosomal functions.

Cruchaga et al. analyzed if TMEM106B variants modify GRN levels. The found that The risk allele of rs1990622 was associated with a mean decrease of the age at onset of 13 years (P = 9.9 × 10^{−7}) and with lower plasma GRN levels in both healthy older adults (P = 4 × 10^{−4}) and GRN mutation carriers (P = 0.0027). Analysis of the HapMap database identified a nonsynonymous single-nucleotide polymorphism rs3173615 (p.T185S) in perfect linkage disequilibrium with rs1990622, that my represent the functional variant driving the association. In summary, these results indicate that the association of rs1990622 with age at onset explains, in part, the wide range in the onset of disease among GRN mutation carriers. The rs1990622 or another variant in linkage disequilibrium could act in a manner similar to APOE in Alzheimer disease, increasing risk for disease in the general population and modifying AAO in mutation carriers. Genetic variation in TMEM106B may influence risk for FTLD-TDP by modulating secreted levels of GRN.

=== Vacuolar atpase ===
vATPases are proton pumps found on cell membranes that are in charge of acidifying multiple organelles, including lysosomes. It has been shown that increase levels of TMEM106B leads to improper acidification of lysosomes through its interaction with vATPases. This interaction is thought to be caused by TMEM106B binding directly to AP1 subunit of vATPase.

=== Microtubule associate protein 6 ===
MAP6 is a microtubule protein that helps stabilize microtubules and provide guidance to signal proteins to microtubules. TMEM106B binds to the C-terminus of MAP6, which helps traffic lysosome to microtubules for transport. It has been shown with increased level of TMEM106B there is excessive binding to MAP6 which impairs transport of the lysosome along the microtubule and leads to accumulation of swollen vacuoles in inappropriate places within the cell.
