= Heterotopia (medicine) =

Presence of some localized tissue type elsewhere in the body

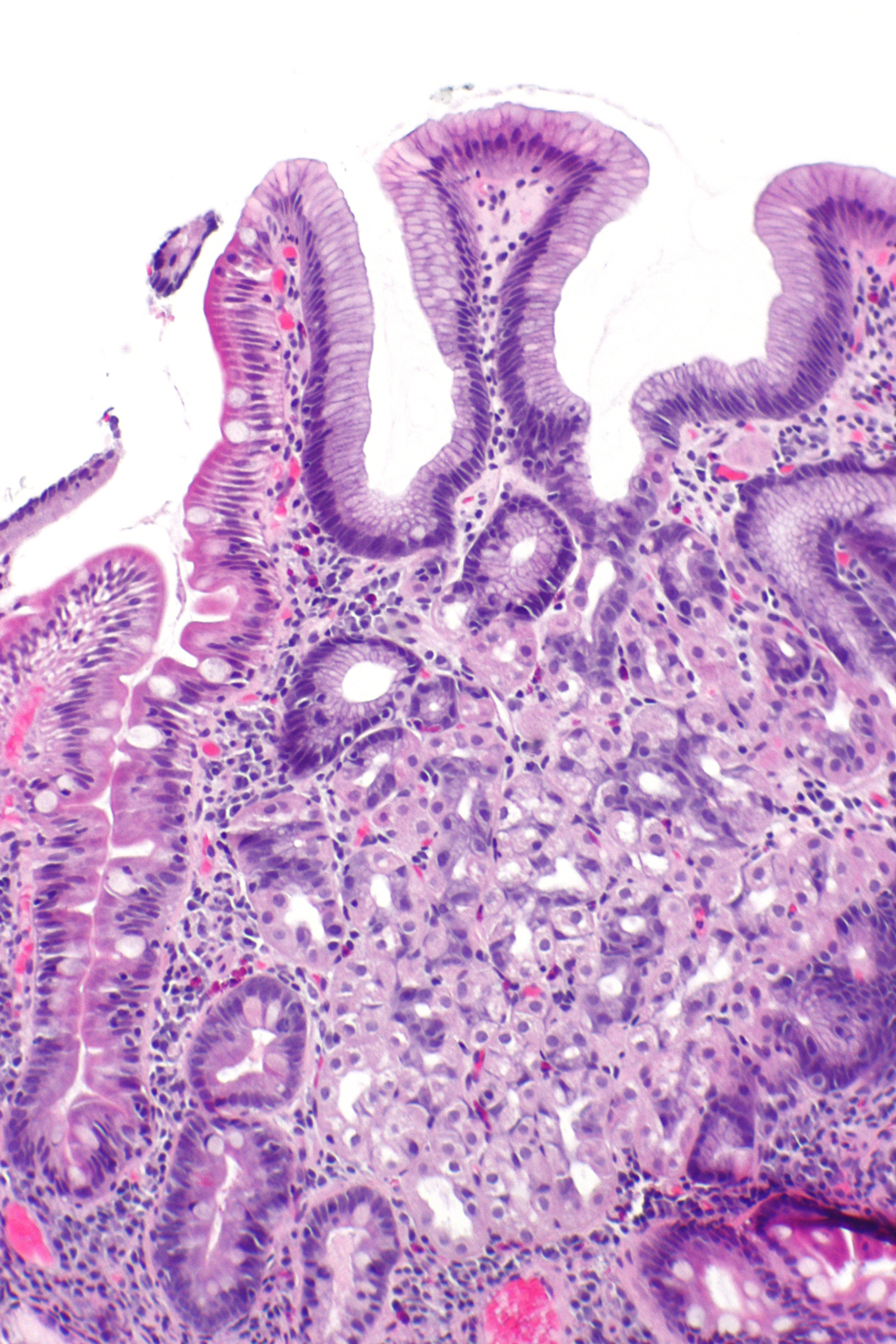
Micrograph showing a duodenal biopsy with gastric heterotopia; H&E stain

In medicine, heterotopia is the presence of a particular tissue type at a non-physiological site, but usually co-existing with original tissue in its correct anatomical location. In other words, it implies ectopic tissue, in addition to retention of the original tissue type.

== Examples ==
In neuropathology, for example, gray matter heterotopia is the presence of gray matter within the cerebral white matter or ventricles. Heterotopia within the brain is often divided into three groups: subependymal heterotopia, focal cortical heterotopia and band heterotopia. Another example is a Meckel's diverticulum, which may contain heterotopic gastric or pancreatic tissue.

In biology specifically, heterotopy refers to an altered location of trait expression. In her book Developmental Plasticity and Evolution, Mary-Jane West Eberhard has a cover art of the sulphur crested cockatoo and comments on the back cover "Did it's [sic] long crest[head] feathers evolve by gradual modification of ancestral head feathers? Or are they descendants of wing feathers, developmentally transplanted onto the head". This idea sets the tone for the rest of her book which goes into depth about developmental novelties and their relation to evolution. Heterotopy is a somewhat obscure but well demonstrated example of how developmental change can lead to novel forms. The central concept is that a feature seen in one area of an organism has had its location changed in evolutionary lineages.

== Heterotopy in molecular biology ==
Heterotopy in molecular biology is the name given to the expression or placement of a gene product from what is typically found in one area to another area. It can also be further expanded to a subtle form of exaptation where a gene product used for one underlying purpose in a diverse group of organisms can re-emerge repeatedly to produce seemingly paraphyletic distributions of traits. But actual phylogenetic analysis supports a monophyletic model as does evolutionary theory. Heterotopy is used to explain this and there are so commonly cited examples.

An example is chitin a very durable structural protein used in surgical sutures as well as durable varnishes but is common to many animals especially crustaceans and insects. But is also found in the African clawed frog (Xenopus laevis).

Wagner et al., suggest that chitin might have a microscopic function observed in cell to cell signaling and the manufacture of insect cuticle for example might represent a recurrent change in the location of expression chitin Speculative, but however Chitin synthase is maintained in many lineages where it does not have an obvious macroscopic function.

It is thought that because so many organisms share such a profound degree of genetic and molecular similarity that shifts in the location of expression might be a regular occurrence throughout time.

Molecular analysis shows that proteins that seem to have a single specific function are instead found in many different tissue types. One example of this phenomenon is crystallin, a clear protein that makes up the lens of the eye; it is also has structural functions in the heart.

== See also ==
- Choristoma
- Heterotopy
