= Granulin =

Protein-coding gene in humans

GRN

Identifiers
- Aliases: GRN, CLN11, GEP, GP88, PCDGF, PEPI, PGranulin, granulin precursor
- External IDs: OMIM: 138945; MGI: 95832; GeneCards: GRN
Available structures
PDB	Ortholog search: PDBe RCSB
PDB	List of PDB id codes 1G26, 2JYE, 2JYT, 2JYU, 2JYV

Gene location (Human)
Chr.	Chromosome 17 (human)
Band	17q21.31	Start	44,345,246 bp
Band	17q21.31	End	44,353,106 bp

Gene location (Mouse)
Chr.	Chromosome 11 (mouse)
Band	11 D|11 66.29 cM	Start	102,321,141 bp
Band	11 D|11 66.29 cM	End	102,327,874 bp
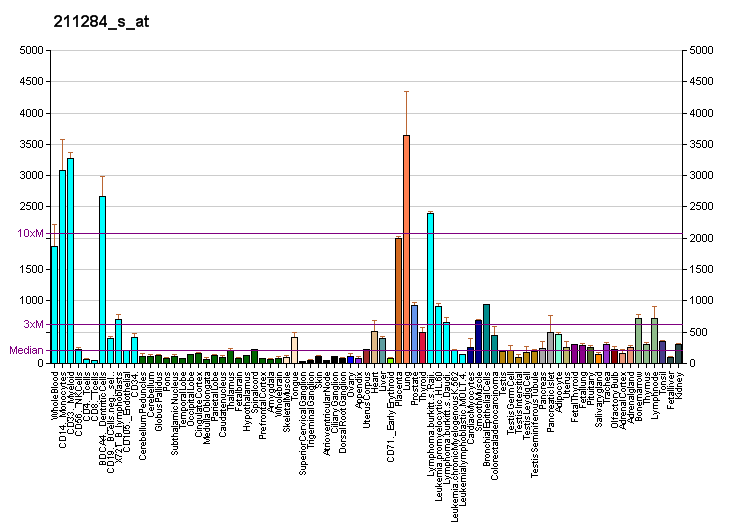

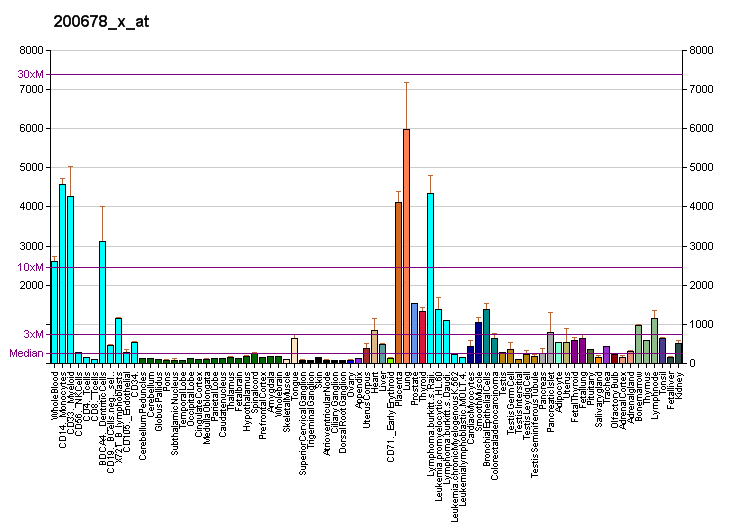

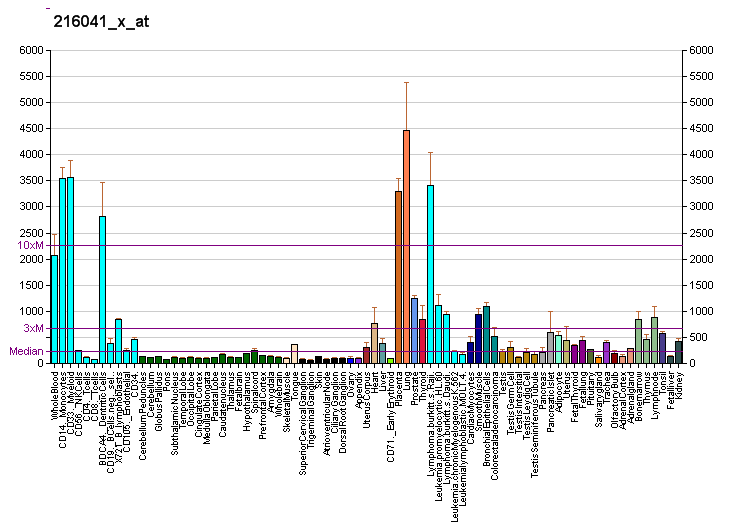
RNA expression pattern
Bgee	Human / Mouse (ortholog); Top expressed in: monocyte; granulocyte; stromal cell of endometrium; mucosa of esophagus; spleen; right lung; upper lobe of left lung; gallbladder; minor salivary glands; bone marrow cell / Top expressed in: stroma of bone marrow; aortic valve; ascending aorta; ciliary body; internal carotid artery; external carotid artery; Paneth cell; decidua; utricle; carotid body; More reference expression data
BioGPS	More reference expression data
Gene ontology
Molecular function	cytokine activity; growth factor activity; protein binding; RNA binding; chaperone binding
Cellular component	extracellular exosome; extracellular region; extracellular space; lysosome; endosome; endoplasmic reticulum; azurophil granule lumen; lysosomal membrane; late endosome; Golgi apparatus; trans-Golgi network; plasma membrane; membrane
Biological process	signal transduction; neutrophil degranulation; regulation of signaling receptor activity; positive regulation of cell migration; astrocyte activation involved in immune response; microglial cell activation involved in immune response; lysosome organization; lysosomal transport; lysosomal lumen acidification; positive regulation of endothelial cell migration; negative regulation of neuron apoptotic process; positive regulation of neuron apoptotic process; positive regulation of angiogenesis; positive regulation of axon regeneration; positive regulation of epithelial cell proliferation; protein stabilization; negative regulation of respiratory burst involved in inflammatory response; positive regulation of inflammatory response to wounding; positive regulation of defense response to bacterium; negative regulation of neutrophil activation; positive regulation of protein folding; negative regulation of microglial cell activation; positive regulation of aspartic-type peptidase activity; positive regulation of lysosome organization
Sources:Amigo / QuickGO
Orthologs
Databases	NCBI: entry; OMA: entry
Species	Human	Mouse
Entrez	2896	14824
Ensembl	ENSG00000030582	ENSMUSG00000034708
UniProt	P28799	P28798
RefSeq (mRNA)	NM_001012479; NM_002087	NM_008175
RefSeq (protein)	NP_002078	NP_032201
Location (UCSC)	Chr 17: 44.35 – 44.35 Mb	Chr 11: 102.32 – 102.33 Mb
PubMed search
- Wikidata
View/Edit Human	View/Edit Mouse

Granulin
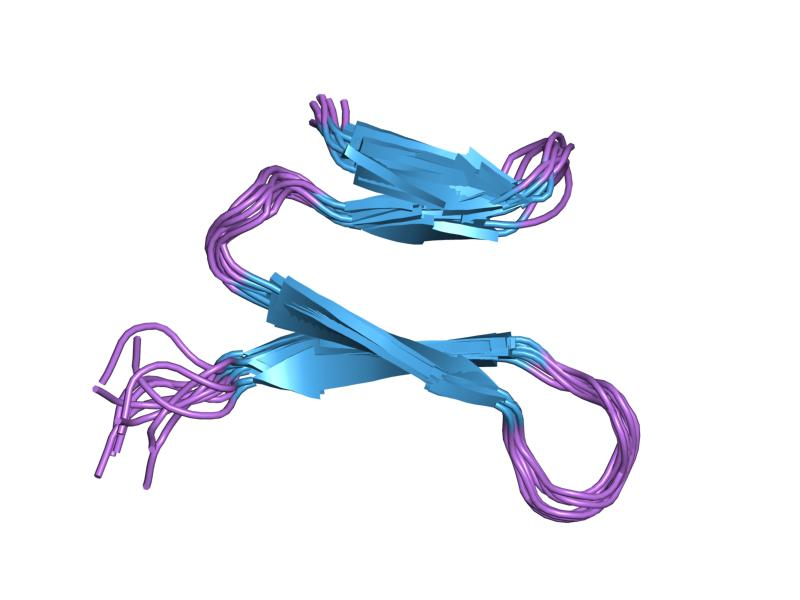
- The solution structure of a well-folded peptide based on the 31-residue amino-terminal subdomain of human granulin a

Identifiers
- Symbol: Granulin
- Pfam: PF00396
- InterPro: IPR000118
- PROSITE: PDOC00634
- SCOP2: 1pcn / SCOPe / SUPFAM
Available protein structures:
- PDB: IPR000118 PF00396 (ECOD; PDBsum)
- AlphaFold: IPR000118; PF00396

Granulin is a protein that in humans is encoded by the GRN gene. Each granulin protein is cleaved from the precursor progranulin, a 593 amino-acid-long and 68.5 kDa protein. While the function of progranulin and granulin have yet to be determined, both forms of the protein have been implicated in development, inflammation, cell proliferation and protein homeostasis. The 2006 discovery of the GRN mutation in a population of patients with frontotemporal dementia has spurred much research in uncovering the function and involvement in disease of progranulin in the body. While there is a growing body of research on progranulin's role in the body, studies on specific granulin residues are still limited.

== Progranulin ==
Progranulin is the precursor protein for granulin. Cleavage of progranulin produces a variety of active 6 kDa granulin peptides. These smaller cleavage products are named granulin A, granulin B, granulin C, etc. Epithelins 1 and 2 are synonymous with granulins A and B, respectively. Cleavage of progranulin into granulin occurs either in the extracellular matrix or the lysosome. Elastase, proteinase 3 and matrix metalloproteinase are proteases capable of cleaving progranulin into individual granulin peptides. Progranulin and granulin can be further differentiated by their hypothesized opposing roles in the cell. While progranulin is associated with anti-inflammation, cleaved granulin peptides have been implicated in pro-inflammatory behavior. A C. elegans study showed that granulin peptides may also participate in toxic activity.

== Expression ==
Progranulin is expressed in a wide variety of cell types both in the periphery and in the central nervous system. Progranulin expression is low in early development, but increases as cells mature. Cell types expressing progranulin include neurons, microglia, astrocytes and endothelial cells. Progranulin has been found to be highly expressed in microglia and up-regulated during injury Within the brain, progranulin mRNA is highly expressed in pyramidal, hippocampal and Purkinje cells cells.

== Structure ==
Each individual granulin domain peptide is 60 amino acids in length. Granulin peptides are cysteine rich and capable of forming 6 disulfide bonds per residue. The disulfide bonds form a central rod-like core that shuttles each individual granulin peptide into a stacked β-sheet configuration. The structure of the granulin protein is similar to the structure of proteins from protein families that consist of hormones, growth factors, ion channel modulators and enzyme inhibitors. Because of progranulin's structural similarities to these proteins, much research was done to interrogate progranulin's potential role as a growth factor. When progranulin is secreted into the extracellular matrix, it is often glycosylated at four confirmed and one tentative N-linked glycosylation sites. The n-terminus of progranulin is hypothesized to be involved in the secretion of progranulin via secretory vesicles. Specifically, progranulin may be involved in regulating exosome excretion. The C-terminus of progranulin is hypothesized to be the primary binding partner of SORT1, a receptor of extracellular progranulin. The structural differences between each individual granulin peptide have yet to be characterized.

== Interacting partners ==
In the extracellular matrix, progranulin binds to receptors on several cell types resulting in either activation of a signal transduction pathway or engulfment into the cell. Several studies have shown progranulin's involvement in the binding of SORT1 and the subsequent trafficking of bounded progranulin to the lysosome. One recent study has shown that progranulin may actually mediate prosaposin trafficking to the lysosome via SORT1. However, the absence of SORT1 does not prevent exogenous progranulin from promoting neurite outgrowth or enhancing cell survival of GRN knockout cells, suggesting that other receptors are involved in mediating extracellular progranulin function For example, SORT1 -/- neuronal cells are still able to bind progranulin. Other studies have suggested tumor necrosis factor and EPH receptor A2 as potential progranulin facilitators. After binding to the receptor, progranulin may induce and modulate signaling pathways such as MAPK/ERK, PI3K/Akt, and FAK. Gene ontology enrichment analysis reveals an association between progranulin and notch receptor signaling. Granulin has also been shown to interact with Cyclin T1 and TRIB3.

== Function ==
=== Development ===
Although progranulin expression increases as cells mature, they are still involved in the development of multiple cell types. Progranulin is hypothesized to be a neurotrophic factor involved in corticogenisis. Induced pluripotent stem cell lines (IPSC) harboring the GRN mutation show a decrease in cortical neuronal differentiation ability. A recent mice study suggests that progranulin may be involved in regulating the early development of cerebellar tissue by selecting for individual climbing fibers as they intersect and form synapses with Purkinje cells. In addition, several studies implicate progranulin in synaptic pruning, a microglial process that occurs during development of the neural network. Cytokines, a neuronal marker for synapse elimination, is found to be upregulated in neurons with the GRN mutation. Increased cytokine tagging results in an increase in microglial density and activity around synapses. Progranulin may also be involved in sexual determination during embryonic development.

=== Inflammation and wound healing ===
Progranulin levels are elevated when tissue is inflamed. After wounding, keratinocytes, macrophages and neutrophils increase production of progranulin. Neutrophils are capable of secreting elastase into the extracellular matrix that is capable of cleaving progranulin into granulin peptides, that promote further promote inflammation. SLPI, inhibitors of elastase, are also released by neutrophils and macrophages to modulate progranulin cleavage. Addition of granulin B in cultured epithelial cells causes cells to secrete IL-8, a chemical that attracts monocytes and neutrophils, which further suggests the involvement of granulin peptides in promoting inflammation. The addition of exogenous SLPI and progranulin is able to alleviate the enhanced inflammatory response of mice that are unable to inhibit the cleavage of progranulin.

=== Cell proliferation ===
Progranulin is highly expressed in cells that are highly proliferative in nature. Several studies implicate progranulin in tumorigenesis and neuronal outgrowth. Progranulin promotes mitogenesis in epithelial cultures. When two epithelial lines were cultured in media with recombinant PGRN, proliferation was stimulated. Knockout of both progranulin homologues in a zebrafish model reduces axonal outgrowth. In primary cortical and motor neurons, progranulin regulates neuronal outgrowth and survival. In primary motor neurons, progranulin has been shown to increase neurite outgrowth by regulating the glycogen synthase kinase-3 beta. Progranulin may function as an autocrine growth factor in tumorigenesis.

=== Lysosomal function ===
The discovery of a GRN mutation leading to lysosomal storage disorder led to many studies that explored progranulin's role in regulating protein homeostasis via the lysosomal pathway. Transcriptional gene network interference study suggests that progranulin is highly involved in lysosomal function and organization. Imaging studies have shown co-localization of progranulin and lysosomal marker LAMP-1. Progranulin expression is regulated by TFEB, a transcription factor that mediates proteins involved in lysosomal biosynthesis. Progranulin may be involved in regulating protease activity. Proteases that could be regulated by progranulin include prosaposin, which is cleaved into saposin peptides in the lysosome, and cathepsin D, the primary protease involved in protein aggregate break down. GRN mutation shares similar neuropathology and clinical phenotype with CHMP2B and VCP mutations, genes that are both involved in the trafficking and breakdown of proteins involved in lysosomal function.

== Clinical significance ==
=== Frontotemporal dementia ===
Heterozygous mutation of the GRN gene leading to progranulin haploinsufficiency causes frontotemporal dementia. These mutations include frameshift, splice site, nonsense signal peptide, Kozak sequence disruptions and missense mutations, which result in either nonsense-mediated decay or the production of non-functional protein. Patients with GRN caused FTD (GRN-FTD) exhibit asymmetric brain atrophy, although age of onset, disease progression and clinical symptoms vary, suggesting that other genetic or environmental factors may be involved in disease expression. Pathological indicators include cytosolic ubiquitin deposits enriched in hyperphosphorylated TAR DNA-binding protein 43 (TDP-43), autophagy-related protein aggregates, ubiquitin-binding protein p62, lentiform intranuclear inclusions, dystrophic neurites and inflammation. Patients with the heterozygote mutation exhibit a reduction of 70–80% serum progranulin levels when compared to controls. Reprogrammed stem cells restore GRN mRNA levels to 50%, further suggesting that some other genetic or environmental factor is involved in regulating FTD disease expression. Mice exhibit reduced autophagic flux and autophagy-dependent clearance. Human FTLD-GRN derived fibroblasts show decrease lysosomal protease activity and lymphoblasts containing neuronal ceroid lipofuscinosis-like storage material. FTLD-GRN IPSC cortical Neurons have enlarged vesicles, lipofuscin accumulation and cathepsin D deficiency.

=== Neuronal ceroid lipofuscinosis ===
Homozygous mutation of the GRN gene causes neuronal ceroid lipofuscinosis (NCL) characterized by an accumulation of autofluorescent lipofuscin, enlarged vacuoles, impairment in lysosomal activity, retinal and brain degeneration, exaggerated inflammatory responses, microgliosis, astrogliosis and behavioral dysfunction such as OCD-like and disinhibition-like behavior. Aged GRN double mutant mice have lipofuscin deposits and enlarge lysosomes, while one group found phosphorylated TDP-43.

=== Other diseases ===
Progranulin may also be involved in cancer development, atherosclerosis and other metabolic disease, Alzheimer's disease, amyotrophic lateral sclerosis (ALS) and limbic predominant age-related TDP-43 encephalopathy (LATE).

Progranulin can promote cyclin D1 expression in breast cancer lines and phosphorylation of proteins through extracellular regulated kinase signaling pathways. Progranulin is highly expressed in ovarian, adrenal carcinomas and immortalized epithelial cells. There is a correlation between progranulin concentration and cancer severity. Granulin release by macrophages has been associated with fibrotic hepatic metastasis in pancreatic cancer. The human liver fluke Opisthorchis viverrini contributes to the development of bile duct (liver) cancer by secreting a granulin-like growth hormone.

Progranulin may also be involved in promoting the progression of atherosclerosis. While progranulin may be anti-atherogenic, granulins may be pro-atherogenic. Increased serum and plasma progranulin levels in patients with type 2 diabetes and visceral obesity implicating progranulin in metabolic diseases.

A recent genome-wide association study (GWAS) has found that genetic variations in GRN are associated with late-onset sporadic Alzheimer's disease (LOAD). These genetic variations change the degradation pathways of misfolded protein contributing misfolded β-amyloid accumulation and plaque formation.
