= TAR DNA-binding protein 43 =

Protein found in humans

TARDBP
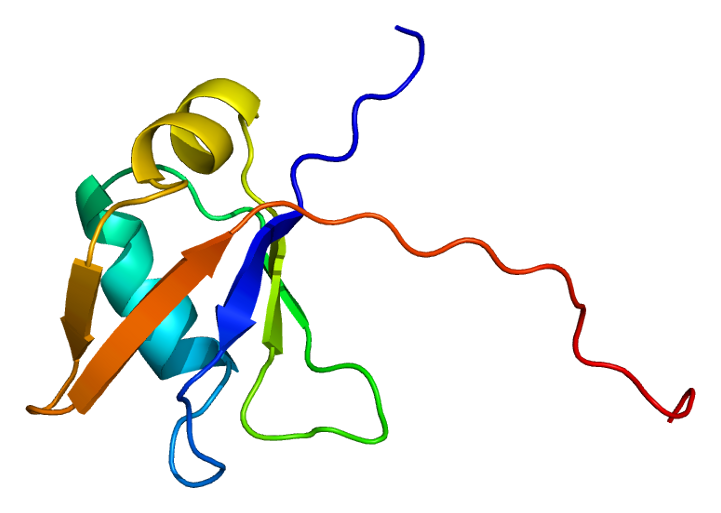

Identifiers
- Aliases: TARDBP, ALS10, TDP-43, TAR DNA binding protein
- External IDs: OMIM: 605078; MGI: 2387629; GeneCards: TARDBP
Available structures
PDB	Ortholog search: PDBe RCSB
PDB	List of PDB id codes 1WF0, 2CQG, 4BS2, 4IUF, 4Y0F, 2N4P, 2N2C, 4Y00, 2N4G, 2N4H, 2N3X

Gene location (Human)
Chr.	Chromosome 1 (human)
Band	1p36.22	Start	11,012,344 bp
Band	1p36.22	End	11,030,528 bp

Gene location (Mouse)
Chr.	Chromosome 4 (mouse)
Band	4|4 E2	Start	148,696,839 bp
Band	4|4 E2	End	148,711,476 bp
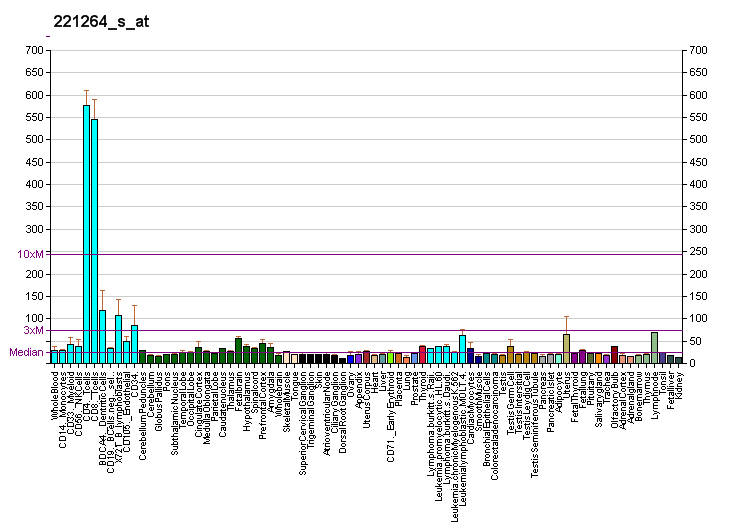
RNA expression pattern
Bgee	Human / Mouse (ortholog); Top expressed in: secondary oocyte; ventricular zone; ganglionic eminence; tibia; rectum; epithelium of nasopharynx; left ovary; left lobe of thyroid gland; tibial nerve; visceral pleura / Top expressed in: primitive streak; spermatocyte; ventricular zone; neural layer of retina; otic placode; abdominal wall; limb bud; epiblast; tail of embryo; otic vesicle; More reference expression data
BioGPS	More reference expression data
Gene ontology
Molecular function	DNA binding; DNA-binding transcription factor activity; mRNA 3'-UTR binding; DNA-binding transcription activator activity, RNA polymerase II-specific; protein binding; identical protein binding; RNA binding; nucleic acid binding; double-stranded DNA binding; single-stranded RNA binding; sequence-specific double-stranded DNA binding
Cellular component	cytoplasm; nuclear speck; nucleoplasm; interchromatin granule; perichromatin fibrils; nucleus; ribonucleoprotein complex; cytoplasmic stress granule
Biological process	negative regulation of protein phosphorylation; regulation of transcription, DNA-templated; mRNA processing; negative regulation of gene expression; response to endoplasmic reticulum stress; transcription, DNA-templated; regulation of cell cycle; negative regulation by host of viral transcription; RNA splicing; nuclear inner membrane organization; 3'-UTR-mediated mRNA stabilization; positive regulation of transcription by RNA polymerase II; positive regulation of insulin secretion; transcription by RNA polymerase II; regulation of apoptotic process; positive regulation of protein import into nucleus; regulation of protein stability; regulation of circadian rhythm; rhythmic process
Sources:Amigo / QuickGO
Orthologs
Databases	NCBI: entry; OMA: entry
Species	Human	Mouse
Entrez	23435	230908
Ensembl	ENSG00000120948	ENSMUSG00000041459
UniProt	Q13148	Q921F2
RefSeq (mRNA)	NM_007375	NM_001003898; NM_001003899; NM_001008545; NM_001008546; NM_145556 NM_001305425
RefSeq (protein)	NP_031401; NP_031401.1	NP_001003898; NP_001003899; NP_001008545; NP_001008546; NP_001292354 NP_663531
Location (UCSC)	Chr 1: 11.01 – 11.03 Mb	Chr 4: 148.7 – 148.71 Mb
PubMed search
- Wikidata
View/Edit Human	View/Edit Mouse

Transactive response DNA binding protein 43 kDa (TAR DNA-binding protein 43 or TDP-43) is a protein that in humans is encoded by the TARDBP gene.

== Structure ==
TDP-43 is 414 amino acid residues long. It consists of four domains: an N-terminal domain spanning residues 1–76 (NTD) with a well-defined fold that has been shown to form a dimer or oligomer; two highly conserved folded RNA recognition motifs spanning residues 106–176 (RRM1) and 191–259 (RRM2), respectively, required to bind target RNA and DNA; an unstructured C-terminal domain encompassing residues 274–414 (CTD), which contains a glycine-rich region, is involved in protein-protein interactions, and harbors most of the mutations associated with familial amyotrophic lateral sclerosis.

The entire protein devoid of large solubilising tags has been purified. The full-length protein is a dimer. The dimer is formed due to a self-interaction between two NTD domains, where the dimerisation can be propagated to form higher-order oligomers.

The protein sequence also has a nuclear localization signal (NLS, residues 82–98), a former nuclear export signal (NES residues 239–250) and 3 putative caspase-3 cleavage sites (residues 13, 89, 219).

In December 2021 the structure of TDP-43 was resolved with cryo-EM but shortly after it was argued that in the context of FTLD-TDP the protein involved could be TMEM106B (which has been also resolved with cryo-EM), rather than of TDP-43.

=== N-Terminal domain (NTD) ===
The NTD located between residues 1 and 76 is involved in TDP-43 polymerization. Indeed, dimers are formed by head-to-head interactions between NTDs, and the polymer thus obtained allows for pre-mRNA splicing. However, further oligomerization brings to more toxic accumulates. This process of polymerization into dimers, larger forms or just stabilizing monomers is dependent on TDP-43 conformational equilibrium between monomers, homodimers and oligomers. Hence, in TDP-43 diseased cells, TDP-43's over-expression leads to the NTD showing high propensity to aggregate. Contrary to this, in normal cells, normal levels of TDP-43 allow for folded NTD, preventing aggregates and polymers formation.

More recently, this domain was found to have a ubiquitin-like structure. It bears 27,6% of homology with Ubiquitin-1 and a β1-β2-α1-β3-β4-β5-β6 + 2*SO_{4}^{2-} form. Ubiquitin-like domain are usually associated with a greater affinity for RNA/DNA. However, in the unique case of TDP-43, the Ubiquitin-like NTD binds directly to ssDNA. This interaction permits the conformational equilibrium cited higher to shift towards non-aggregated forms.

The domain spanning from [1,80] has a solenoid-like structure which sterically impedes interactions between aggregation prone C-term regions.

All of this raises the possibility that NTD and the RNA recognition motifs (later on defined) could cooperatively interact with nucleic acids to accomplish TDP-43's physiological functions.

=== Mitochondrial localization signal ===
There are six mitochondrial localization signals to be accounted on TDP-43's amino acid sequence, although only M1, M3, and M5 were shown to be essential for mitochondrial localization. Indeed, their ablation leads to a lessened mitochondrial localization.

These localizing sequences are found on the following amino acids:

M1: [35, 41], M2: [105, 112], M3: [146-150], M4: [228, 235], M5: [294, 300], M6: [228, 236].

=== Nuclear localization signal (NLS) ===
The nuclear localization signal (NLS) domain is located between residues 82 and 98 is of critical importance in ALS, and such is witnessed by the depletion or the mutations (notably A90V) of this domain, which cause loss-of-function from nucleus and promote aggregating, two processes very likely to conduct to TDP-43's toxic gain of function.

It is thereby of the utmost importance to note that TDP-43's nuclear localization is absolutely critical for it to fulfill its physiological functions.

=== RNA recognition motif ===
The RNA recognition motif ranges between residues 105 and 181, much like many hnRNPs, TDP-43's RRMs encompass highly conserved motifs of primary importance for fulfilling their function. Both RRMs follow this pattern: β1-α1-β2-β3-α2-β4-β5, which allows them to bind to both RNA and DNA onto U G/T G-repeats of 3'UTR (Untranslated Terminal Regions) end of mRNA/DNA.

These sequences mainly ensure mRNA processing, RNA export and RNA stabilizing. It is notably thanks to these sequences that TDP-43 importantly binds to its own mRNA regulates its very own solubility and polymerization.

=== RRM2 ===
RRM2 spans between residues 181 and 261. In pathological conditions, it notably binds to p65/NF-kB, an apoptosis implicated factor, and is thus a potential therapeutic target. Moreover it can be burdened with a mutation, D169G, altering a key cleaving site for regulating formation of toxic inclusions.

=== Nuclear export signal (NES) ===
The nuclear export signal is located between residues 239 and 251 sequence probably bears a role in TDP-43's shuttling function, and was recently found using a prediction algorithm.

=== Disordered glycin rich C-terminal domain (CTD) ===
The Disordered Glycin Rich C-terminal domain is located between residues 277 and 414. Much like 70 other RNA binding proteins, TDP-43 bears a Q/N rich domain [344, 366] which resembles yeast prion sequence. This sequence is called a Prion-Like Domain (PLD).

PLDs are low complexity sequences that have been reported to mediate gene regulation via Liquid-Liquid Phase Transition (LLP) thus driving RNP granule assembly. Forming these microscopically visible RNP granules is thought to induce more effective gene regulatory process.

It is here noted that LLP are reversible phenomenons of de-mixing a solution into two distinct liquid phases, hereby forming granules.

Mutations within the TDP-43 proteins Glycine Rich Region (GRR) have recently been identified as associates that can contribute to various neurodegenerative diseases, with the most notable and common NDD being ALS, about 10% of the mutations causing familial ALS are accredited with the TDP-43 protein

This CTD is often reported to play important role in pathogenic behavior of TDP-43:

RNPs granules could have a role in stress response, and thus, aging, or persistence stress could lead the LLPs to turn into irreversible Liquid Solid Phase separation, pathological aggregates notably found in ALS neurons.

The CTD's disorganized structure can turn into a full fledged amyloid-like beta-sheet rich structure, causing it to adopt prion-like properties.

Moreover, CTFs are a common marker in diseased neurons and are argued to be of high toxicity.

However, there is a lack of consensus regarding the points above: due to its hydrophobic structure, TDP-43 can be hard to analyze, and precise sites of phosphorylation, methylation, or even binding remain elusive.

== Function ==
TDP-43 is a transcriptional repressor that binds to chromosomally integrated TAR DNA and represses HIV-1 transcription. In addition, this protein regulates alternate splicing of the CFTR gene. In particular, TDP-43 is a splicing factor binding to the intron8/exon9 junction of the CFTR gene and to the intron2/exon3 region of the apoA-II gene. A similar pseudogene is present on chromosome 20.

TDP-43 has been shown to bind both DNA and RNA and have multiple functions in transcriptional repression, pre-mRNA splicing and translational regulation. Recent work has characterized the transcriptome-wide binding sites revealing that thousands of RNAs are bound by TDP-43 in neurons.

TDP-43 was originally identified as a transcriptional repressor that binds to chromosomally integrated trans-activation response element (TAR) DNA and represses HIV-1 transcription. It was also reported to regulate alternate splicing of the CFTR gene and the apoA-II gene.

In spinal motor neurons TDP-43 has also been shown in humans to be a low molecular weight neurofilament (hNFL) mRNA-binding protein. It has also shown to be a neuronal activity response factor in the dendrites of hippocampal neurons suggesting possible roles in regulating mRNA stability, transport and local translation in neurons.

It has been demonstrated that zinc ions are able to induce aggregation of endogenous TDP-43 in cells. Moreover, zinc could bind to RNA binding domain of TDP-43 and induce the formation of amyloid-like aggregates in vitro. Consistently, Zn^{2+} binds a short peptide (residues 256–264) from the C-terminus of TDP-43's RRM2 domain with an association constant of ~1.6×10^{5} M^{−1}, supporting a specific Zn^{2+} site that may regulate nucleic-acid binding.

=== DNA repair ===
TDP-43 protein is a key element of the non-homologous end joining (NHEJ) enzymatic pathway that repairs DNA double-strand breaks (DSBs) in pluripotent stem cell-derived motor neurons. TDP-43 is rapidly recruited to DSBs where it acts as a scaffold for the further recruitment of the XRCC4-DNA ligase protein complex that then acts to seal the DNA breaks. In TDP-43 depleted human neural stem cell-derived motor neurons, as well as in sporadic ALS patients' spinal cord specimens there is significant DSB accumulation and reduced levels of NHEJ.

== Clinical significance ==
A hyper-phosphorylated, ubiquitinated and cleaved form of TDP-43—known as pathologic TDP43—is the major disease protein in ubiquitin-positive, tau-, and alpha-synuclein-negative frontotemporal dementia (FTLD-TDP, previously referred to as FTLD-U) and in amyotrophic lateral sclerosis (ALS). Elevated levels of the TDP-43 protein have also been identified in individuals diagnosed with chronic traumatic encephalopathy, and has also been associated with ALS leading to the inference that athletes who have experienced multiple concussions and other types of head injury are at an increased risk for both encephalopathy and motor neuron disease (ALS). Abnormalities of TDP-43 also occur in an important subset of Alzheimer's disease patients, correlating with clinical and neuropathologic features indexes. Misfolded TDP-43 is found in the brains of older adults over age 85 with limbic-predominant age-related TDP-43 encephalopathy, (LATE), a form of dementia. New monoclonal antibodies, 2G11 and 2H1, have been developed to specify different TDP-43 inclusion types that occur across neurodegenerative diseases, without relying on hyper-phosphorylated epitopes. These antibodies were raised against an epitope within the RRM2 domain (amino acid residues 198–216).

Mutations in the TARDBP gene are associated with neurodegenerative disorders including frontotemporal lobar degeneration and amyotrophic lateral sclerosis (ALS). In particular, the TDP-43 mutants M337V and Q331K are being studied for their roles in ALS. While the aberrant mislocalization and cytoplasmic aggregation of TDP-43 characterizes FTLD with TDP-43 pathology (FTLD-TDP), recent work suggests the amyloid fibrils found in human FTLD-TDP brains are composed of transmembrane lysosomal protein TMEM106b rather than TDP-43. Cytoplasmic TDP-43 pathology is the dominant histopathological feature of multisystem proteinopathy. The N-terminal domain, which contributes importantly to the aggregation of the C-terminal region, has a novel structure with two negatively charged loops. A recent study has demonstrated that cellular stress can trigger the abnormal cytoplasmic mislocalisation of TDP-43 in spinal motor neurons in vivo, providing insight into how TDP-43 pathology may develop in sporadic ALS patients.
