= CASI =

CASI or Casi may refer to:

== Acronyms ==
- Canadian Aeronautics and Space Institute
- Canadian Association of Snowboard Instructors
- China Aerospace Studies Institute, a research institute of the United States Department of the Air Force
- Center for the Advanced Study of India, at the University of Pennsylvania, US
- Club Atlético San Isidro, a sports club in San Isidro, Argentina
- Cognitive Abilities Screening Instrument
- Computer-assisted self interviewing
- Continental Air Services, Inc, an airline

== Other uses ==
- "Casi" (song), a 2003 song by Soraya
- Calcium monosilicide
- Chashi or casi, hilltop forts of the Ainu
- Casi (given name)
