= Dementia =

Cognitive decline

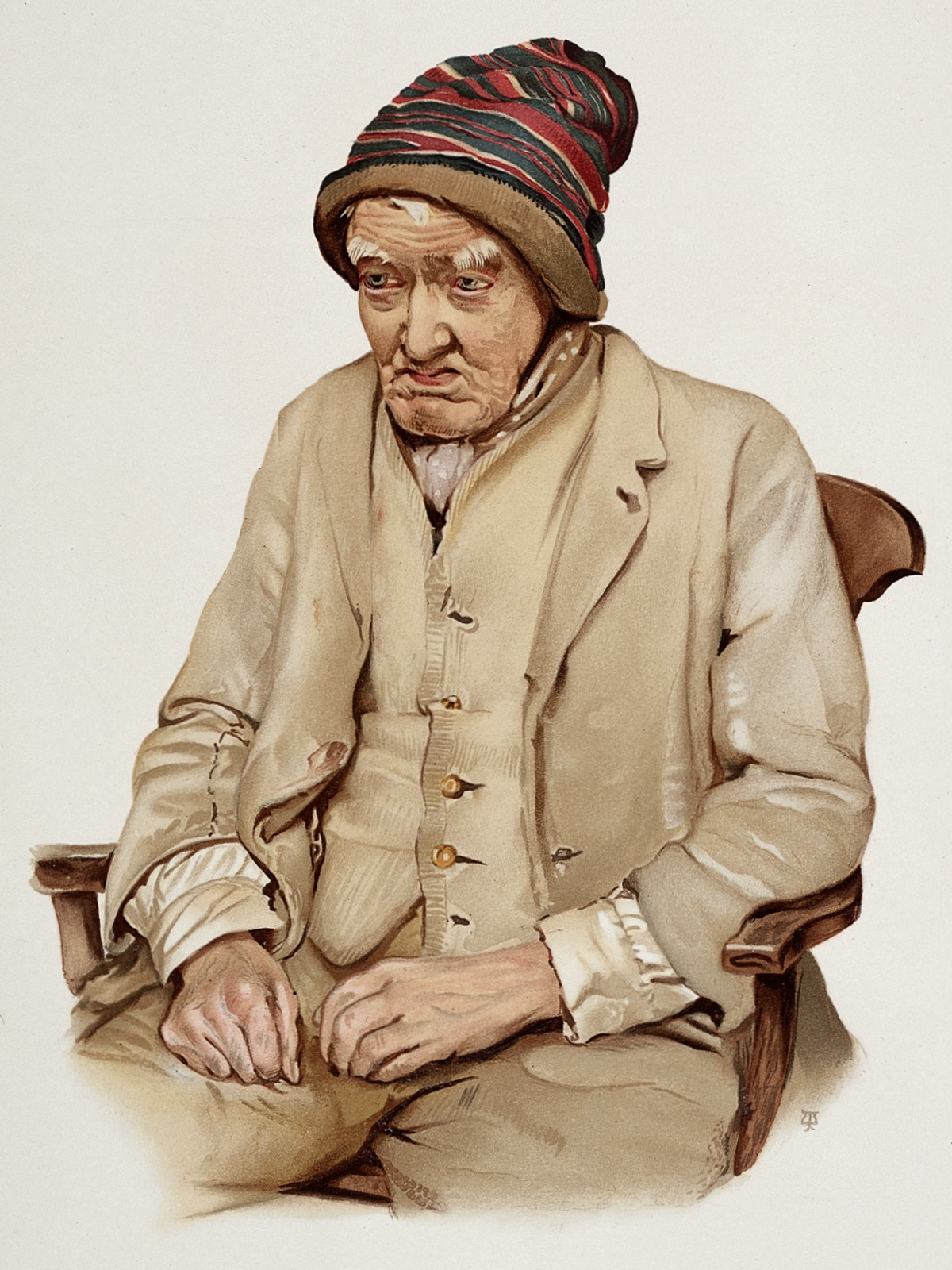
- 1896 lithograph of a man with dementia
- Specialty: Neurology, geriatrics, psychiatry
- Symptoms: Decreased ability to think and remember, problems with language, decreased motivation
- Complications: Include malnutrition, dehydration, pneumonia, injuries from falls
- Usual onset: Varies, usually gradual
- Duration: Varies, usually long term
- Causes: Neurodegeneration, vascular disease, stroke, traumatic brain injuries
- Risk factors: Several across the life course (e.g. less education, hearing loss, vision loss, physical inactivity, obesity, high cholesterol, hypertension, diabetes, smoking, excessive alcohol consumption, social isolation, air pollution, traumatic brain injury, depression)
- Diagnostic method: Clinical assessment, cognitive testing (mini–mental state examination), and imaging
- Differential diagnosis: Delirium, depression, hypothyroidism
- Prevention: Addressing risk factors throughout the life course, e.g. preventing, reducing or treating hearing and vision loss, depression, head injury and vascular risk factors (e.g. cholesterol, diabetes), decreasing smoking, and maintaining physical activity and cognitive stimulation
- Treatment: Varies but supportive care is given
- Medication: Varies depending on the type and stage, most medications have a small benefit
- Prognosis: Varies, dementia is a life limiting condition and life expectancy is usually shortened
- Frequency: 57 million (2021)
- Deaths: 1.62 million dementia-related deaths (2019) estimated to increase to 4.91 million by 2050

Dementia is a syndrome, often associated with neurodegenerative diseases such as Alzheimer's, and characterized by a general decline in cognitive processes that affects the ability to perform everyday activities. This typically involves problems with memory, thinking, behavior, and motor control. Aside from memory impairment and a disruption in thought patterns, the most common symptoms of dementia include emotional problems, difficulties with language, and decreased motivation. The symptoms may be described as occurring in a continuum over several stages. Dementia is an incurable, progressive disorder, with varying degrees of severity (mild to major) and many forms or subtypes. The condition has a significant effect on the individual, their caregivers, and their social relationships in general. Dementia is not the same as age-related decline in cognition and memory, with no change in intelligence.

The most common form of dementia is Alzheimer's. Dementia can be caused by brain injuries and stroke. It has also been described as a spectrum of disorders, with subtypes of dementia based on which known disorder caused its development, such as Parkinson's disease for Parkinson's disease dementia, Huntington's disease for Huntington's disease dementia, vascular disease for vascular dementia, HIV infection causing HIV dementia, frontotemporal lobar degeneration for frontotemporal dementia, Lewy body disease for dementia with Lewy bodies, and prion diseases. Subtypes of neurodegenerative dementias may also be based on the underlying pathology of misfolded proteins, such as synucleinopathies and tauopathies. The coexistence of more than one type of dementia is known as mixed dementia.

Diagnosis is usually based on history of the illness and cognitive testing with imaging. Imaging can help to determine the dementia subtype, and to exclude other causes. Blood tests are usually taken to rule out other possible reversible causes such as hypothyroidism (an underactive thyroid). Fluid biomarkers detected in cerebrospinal fluid, and in blood can identify Alzheimer's disease. PET scans can detect amyloid beta and tau, the two intrinsically disordered proteins that are the hallmark features of Alzheimer's.

Although the greatest risk factor for developing dementia is aging, dementia is not a normal part of the aging process; many people aged 90 and above show no signs of dementia. Risk factors, diagnosis and caregiving practices are influenced by cultural and socio-environmental factors. Several risk factors for dementia, such as smoking and obesity, are modifiable by lifestyle changes.

As of 2025, dementia is the seventh leading cause of death worldwide and has 10 million new cases reported every year. In the UK it is the leading cause of death. It is one of the main causes of disabilities in those aged over 65. There is no known cure for dementia.

Acetylcholinesterase inhibitors such as donepezil are often used in some dementia subtypes and may be beneficial in mild to moderate stages, but the overall benefit may be minor. There are many measures that can improve the quality of life of a person with dementia and their caregivers. Cognitive behavioral therapy may give some benefit for treating the associated symptoms of depression.

== Signs and symptoms ==
The signs and symptoms of dementia may vary between individuals, and may vary according to the underlying subtype, particularly in the early stages but at the end stage of all types they are similar. Symptoms may be grouped into three areas: cognitive, neuropsychiatric (behavioral and psychological), and motor.

The cognitive symptoms of dementia relate to the area of the brain affected. Typically this includes memory plus one other cognitive region affecting language (commonly), attention, problem solving or perception and orientation. Signs of dementia include wandering, and getting lost in a familiar neighborhood, using unusual words to refer to familiar objects, forgetting the name of a close family member or friend, forgetting old memories, forgetting to pay bills, and being unable to complete tasks independently. The symptoms progress at a continuous rate over several stages. Most types of dementia are slowly progressive with some deterioration of the brain well established before signs become apparent.

Neuropsychiatric symptoms (NPS) are a major feature of dementia affecting more than 90% of all cases, at different stages. They often present as first or early symptoms or syndromes, as mild behavioral impairment (MBI) that may reflect the subtype of dementia at issue. For example, a study has found that the first symptoms as NPS of personality change, and disinhibition will relate to a diagnosis of frontotemporal dementia. The presence of MBI on its own is not a cognitive impairment and is not recognized as dementia but may be an indicator for the development of mild cognitive impairment, as a predementia type. It may also be seen as a transitional state in the development of dementia.

The behavioral symptoms can include agitation, restlessness, inappropriate behavior, disinhibition, and verbal or physical aggression.

Psychological symptoms can include depression, hallucinations, delusions, apathy, and anxiety. Also common are personality changes with the progression of dementia, such as increases in neuroticism (negativity), and a decline in conscientiousness.

Motor symptoms and signs may include changes in gait, repetitive movements, parkinsonism, or seizures. Changes in gait can be responsible for falls. An inability to relax muscles, known as paratonia is an induced motor dysfunction that affects most people with dementia. Motor impairments are correlated with cognitive impairments, and are a main cause of disability and dependency. In advanced dementia paratonia may lead to fixed postures with contracted muscles, which can lead to broken skin, and infection, and also cause pain on movement. This type of motor disorder is not the same as that found in Lewy body dementias.

The course of dementia is generally described in three major stages (early or mild, middle or moderate, and late or severe) that show a pattern of progressive cognitive and functional impairment. Other more detailed scales outline five or seven stages. A prodromal stage, or pre-dementia stage may also be included. With Alzheimer's disease an asymptomatic preclinical stage may precede the onset of symptoms in the prodromal stage. A preclinical stage can be identified by the presence of noted brain changes of Alzheimer's disease but this stage does not always develop into dementia. As of 2024 this stage is now classed as Clinical Stage 1.

Different scales used to assess the stage of dementia include the Global Deterioration Scale (GDS) that uses seven stages in the progression, with mild (early) dementia only appearing as stage 4. Two other scales used in relation to GDS are the Brief Cognitive Rating Scale (BCRS), and the Functional Assessment Staging Tool (FAST). The BCRS is a quick assessment that coincides with the GDS. It uses five axes in assessment – concentration, memory (recent and past), orientation, functioning and self-care. FAST places more emphasis on functioning in daily living. Another scale used is the Clinical Dementia Rating (CDR) scale originally designed just for Alzheimer's, that evaluates six main areas including memory, judgement, problem-solving, and personal care.

=== Prodromal ===
A prodromal stage is a mild cognitive impairment (MCI) stage of pre-dementia, and may include mild behavioral impairment. Signs and symptoms at the prodromal stage may be subtle, often only becoming apparent in hindsight.

Mild cognitive impairment may progress to a dementia subtype; changes in the person's brain have been happening for a long time, but the symptoms are just beginning to appear, and are not severe enough to affect daily function. If and when they do, the diagnosis becomes one of a causative dementia subtype, such as minor neurocognitve disorder of Lewy body disease, for example. The person may have some memory problems and trouble finding words, but they can solve everyday problems and competently handle their life affairs.

Mild cognitive impairment has been relisted in both DSM-5 and ICD-11 as "mild neurocognitive disorder", a milder form of a major neurocognitive disorder (dementia). MCI does not always progress to dementia, as sometimes symptoms resolve.

=== Early ===
In the early or mild stage of dementia, symptoms become noticeable to other people, and begin to interfere with daily activities, but only some help is needed. During this stage, it is good practice to ensure that advance care planning including advance directives are discussed.

Dementia subtypes affect different regions of the brain which in the early stage means that the symptoms are varied between individuals. The symptoms of early dementia usually include memory difficulty, but can also include some problems with language. Managing finances may prove difficult. Other signs might be getting lost in new places, repeating things, and personality changes.

=== Middle ===
In the middle or moderate stage symptoms become more pronounced and more support will be needed with daily activities. Memory impairment worsens and frequent reminders may be needed. There may be difficulty in the recognition of familiar people. Holding onto new information becomes more difficult, causing questions to be continually repeated. In the middle stage word retrieval may be a problem; forgetting what they are saying in mid-sentence, and it may be harder to follow what is being said.

In neurodegenerative dementias a lack of insight into having the condition will become evident.

=== Late ===
People with late-stage, or severe, dementia typically turn increasingly inward and need assistance with most or all of their personal care. 24-hour supervision to meet basic needs and ensure personal safety is usually needed. If left unsupervised, they may wander or fall, fail to recognize common dangers such as a hot stove, or fail to realize that they need to use the bathroom and become incontinent. Both urinary and fecal incontinence may become prominent features that can prove challenging for both the person affected and the caregiver. They may not want to get out of bed, or may need assistance doing so. They may also struggle to walk. Commonly, the person no longer recognizes familiar faces. Sleep disturbances become more common and worsen in this stage.

Changes in eating frequently occur. Cognitive awareness is needed for eating and swallowing and progressive cognitive decline in advanced dementia, can result in eating and swallowing difficulties. This can cause food to be refused, or choked on, and help with feeding will often be required. For ease of feeding, food may be liquidized into a thick purée. The use of a feeding tube is not recommended; there are many complications and unwanted consequences associated with tube feeding.

Paradoxical lucidity, an unexpected transient recovery of mental clarity, can occur in some cases. Terminal lucidity may manifest shortly before death.

== Types ==
Most types of dementia including Alzheimer's (the most common), Lewy body dementias, and frontotemporal dementia are neurodegenerative diseases, with protein misfolding as a cardinal feature. The next most common type of dementia after Alzheimer's is vascular dementia, a cerebrovascular disease. These are the main primary types. Secondary types of dementia are secondary to a pre-existing condition, such as Huntington's dementia secondary to Huntington's disease, and HIV-associated dementia secondary to HIV. Different dementias have different causes and risk factors. But all types are characterized by loss of neurons, and consequent functioning. Depressive cognitive disorder, formerly pseudodementia, describes dementia-like symptoms as a dementia secondary to a psychiatric condition especially to clinical depression.

Secondary dementias are those that develop from another condition, and include chronic traumatic encephalopathy, Huntington's disease dementia, HIV-associated neurocognitive disorder, prion diseases, and alcohol use disorder.

=== Alzheimer's ===
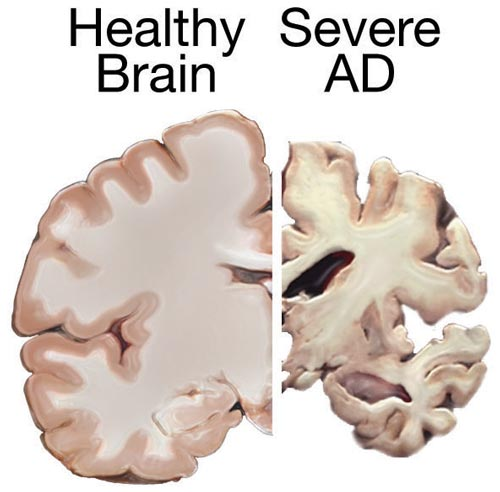
Brain atrophy in severe Alzheimer's

Alzheimer's dementia is caused by Alzheimer's disease, and accounts for 60–70% of cases of dementia worldwide. Alzheimer's is often part of a mixed dementia diagnosis, typically together with vascular dementia, but also with Lewy body dementia. Mixed dementia has been acknowledged to be the most common type of dementia.

A preclinical stage is described for Alzheimer's which is asymptomatic but which shows evidence of Alzheimer's pathology. This can precede the prodromal stage where symptoms become apparent. The loss of the sense of smell (anosmia) is recognized as a long prodromal stage in Alzheimer's.

Symptoms may vary among individuals. Typically one of the first signs is a problem with memory. Other cognitive impairments can include difficulty in finding the right word, difficulties with visuospatial ability, and impaired reasoning and judgment. In the middle stage hallucinations may be a feature. In later stages the symptoms become more severe, and include greater confusion, and changes in behavior. A lack of insight into having a condition will become evident.

The hallmark features of Alzheimer's disease are the deposits of amyloid beta in extracellular amyloid plaques, and the intracellular neurofibrillary tangles formed by hyperphosphorylated tau proteins. A protein (TREM2) malfunction can affect the microglial role of clearing cellular debris, allowing a build up of debris and plaques. Astrocytes another type of glial cell are recruited to help clear the debris but they too can become faulty as a result of the protein malfunction, and they with the microglia build up around the neurons and cause chronic inflammation that further damages the neurons. The plaques and tangles may be detected in a preclinical stage decades before the onset of symptoms that appear in the prodromal stage.

Before the early 2000s, only brain tissue at autopsy could definitively diagnose Alzheimer's. Cerebrospinal fluid (CSF) analysis has since become available for detecting AD biomarkers, but blood-based biomarkers have taken the lead. Flotillin has been proposed as a potential fluid biomarker for detecting early Alzheimers in either CSF or blood. A finger-prick blood sample for the diagnosis of early AD has been developed using p-tau 217 as biomarker.

Several neuroimaging techniques can help diagnose and differentiate dementia types and show their stage of progression. These include magnetic resonance imaging (MRI), CT scans, and amyloid PET scans using a tracer Pittsburgh compound B or florbetapir. Amyloid PET imaging has made possible the development of anti-amyloid immunotherapies, such as donanemab, and lecanemab, for use in mild NCI due to Alzheimer's or in mild Alzheimer's. For detecting tau protein another PET scan tracer flortaucipir was approved for use in the US and Europe in 2024.

The part of the brain most affected by Alzheimer's is the medial temporal lobe which has a vital role in spatial and episodic memory. The medial temporal lobe includes the hippocampus, amygdala, and parahippocampal gyrus, and is the earliest site of atrophy and tau pathology. NODDI (neurite orientation dispersion and density imaging) is an emerging diffusion MRI technique for examining the microstructure of the grey and white matter of the brain's tissue. It can show changes in neurodegeneration in relation to ageing and to Alzheimer's, and is used for investigating links between neurite density, MCI and Alzheimer's.

=== Vascular ===
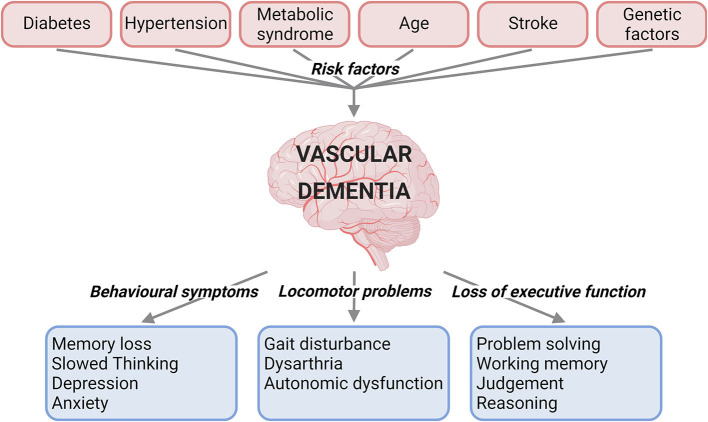
Risk factors and symptoms of vascular dementia

Vascular dementia accounts for at least 20% of dementia cases, making it the second most common type. It is also the most common type found with Alzheimer's in mixed dementia. Vascular dementia is caused by disease or injury affecting the blood supply to the brain, typically involving a series of mini-strokes. Symptoms depend on where in the brain the strokes occurred and whether the blood vessels affected were large or small. Hallucinations may also feature in the middle stage. Repeated injury can cause progressive dementia over time, while a single injury located in an area critical for cognition such as the hippocampus, or thalamus, can lead to sudden cognitive decline. Elements of vascular dementia may be present in all other forms of dementia.

Brain scans may show evidence of multiple strokes of different sizes in various locations. Risk factors include tobacco use, high blood pressure, atrial fibrillation, high cholesterol, diabetes, or other signs of vascular disease such as a previous heart attack or angina.

=== Lewy body ===
Lewy body dementias include dementia with Lewy bodies, and Parkinson's disease dementia. Parkinson's disease and dementia with Lewy bodies are synucleinopathies characterized by the presence of Lewy bodies in the brain. (A Lewy body is an inclusion body as an aggregate of alpha-synuclein a presynaptic protein in neurons). Parkinson's disease dementia, and dementia with Lewy bodies both present with similar signs and symptoms, and the only real difference between them is that Parkinson's disease precedes Parkinson's dementia typically by about a year.

The prodromal symptoms of dementia with Lewy bodies (DLB) include mild cognitive impairment, and delirium onset. The symptoms of DLB are more frequent, more severe, and earlier presenting than in the other subtypes.

Dementia with Lewy bodies has the primary symptoms of fluctuating cognition, alertness or attention; REM sleep behavior disorder (RBD); one or more of the main features of parkinsonism, not due to medication or stroke; and repeated visual hallucinations. Up to 80% of cases experience visual hallucinations that are well formed and usually of people, animals, or children. There is also disruption in autonomic bodily functions. Abnormal sleep behaviors may begin before cognitive decline is observed and are a core feature of DLB. RBD is diagnosed either by sleep study recording or, when sleep studies cannot be performed, by medical history and validated questionnaires.

=== Frontotemporal ===
Frontotemporal dementias (FTDs) are characterized by drastic personality changes, and language difficulties. In all types, early social withdrawal and lack of insight are major features but not memory problems. The most common variant known as behavioral variant FTD (bv-FTD) presents major symptoms of changes in personality and behavior. bv-FTD is a young onset dementia typically affecting those between the ages of 45 and 65. In bv-FTD, there is a progressive atrophy of grey matter that in early stages affects areas of executive function responsible for inhibitory control for example. This early atrophy results in socioemotional disturbances such as impulsive behavior.

Other rare subtypes of FTD are three variants of primary progressive aphasia – language-led dementias that feature aphasia (language problems) as the main symptom. One type is semantic dementia (or semantic PPA) with the main feature of the loss of the meaning of words. Another type is called progressive nonfluent aphasia (or agrammatic PPA), mainly a difficulty in producing speech, not being able to find the right words, and also problems in coordinating the muscles needed for speech. Eventually the ability to talk at all may be lost. The third type is logopenic progressive aphasia (discovered in 2004) and features impairment in the repetition of words or phrases, and impairment in retrieving words.

A frontotemporal dementia (bvFTD) that overlaps with amyotrophic lateral sclerosis (ALS) is known as (FTD-ALS), and includes the symptoms of bvFTD (behavior, language and movement problems) and decline in motor functions of amyotrophic lateral sclerosis. Two FTD-related disorders are progressive supranuclear palsy, and corticobasal degeneration, both of which are tauopathies.

=== Mixed dementia ===
More than one type of dementia, known as mixed dementia, may exist together in at least 10% of dementia cases. The most common type of mixed dementia is Alzheimer's disease and vascular dementia, and the second most common is Alzheimer's and Lewy body dementia. Mixed dementia occurs more frequently in the elderly and seems to progress more rapidly. In 2025 an NIH study reported that mixed dementia has been acknowledged as the most common type of dementia.

Diagnosis of mixed dementia can be difficult, as often only one type will predominate, which means that many people may miss out on potentially helpful treatments. Mixed dementia can mean that symptoms onset earlier, and worsen more quickly since more parts of the brain will be affected.

=== Hippocampal sclerosis ===
The hippocampus is important in the formation of memories. In a condition of hippocampal sclerosis, the hippocampal tissue becomes hardened and shrinks. Associated brain changes are often accompanied by accumulated misfolded TDP-43. This type of dementia typically affects those aged over 85 years.

=== Autoimmune ===
Cognitive decline due to an autoimmune disease can be mistaken for that of a dementia subtype. The importance of correctly identifying an autoimmune dementia is critical in approved treatments. Being treated for dementia rules out immmunotherapy which could treat and reverse the disorder. Additionally, treatment of Alzheimer's with monoclonal antibodies would be contraindicated if there are unreported autoantibodies present.

=== Childhood ===
There are many childhood dementias, most of which have a genetic cause.

=== Early onset ===
Around 7% of people over the age of 65 have dementia, with slightly higher rates (up to 10% of those over 65) in places with relatively high life expectancy. Dementia can develop before the age of 65 when it is known as early onset dementia or young-onset dementia.

Less than 1% of those with early-onset Alzheimer's dementia have genetic mutations that cause a much earlier onset, around the age of 45.

=== Later onset ===
A type of dementia has been classified as limbic-predominant age-related TDP-43 encephalopathy (LATE). It can only be diagnosed on autopsy when clusters of TDP-43 are found in the brain. It usually has a late onset typically affecting those over 80, and can also be found alongside Alzheimer's disease.

=== Huntington's ===
Huntington's disease is a neurodegenerative disease caused by mutations in a single gene HTT, that encodes for huntingtin protein. Symptoms include cognitive impairment that usually declines further into dementia. Other symptoms include chorea (jerky movements), memory lapses, depression, stumbling and clumsiness, mood swings, and behavior changes such as impulsivity and irritability that can become more aggressive in later stages.

=== HIV ===
HIV-associated neurocognitive disorder (HAND) results as a late stage from HIV infection, and mostly affects younger people. The essential features of HAND are disabling cognitive impairment accompanied by motor dysfunction, speech problems and behavioral change. Cognitive impairment is characterised by mental slowness, trouble with memory and poor concentration. Motor symptoms include a loss of fine motor control leading to clumsiness, poor balance and tremors. Behavioral changes may include apathy, lethargy and diminished emotional responses and spontaneity. HAND is the predominant form, and HIV-associated dementia is rare.

=== Prions ===
Prion diseases typically cause dementia that worsens over weeks to months. Prion diseases are very rare and include Creutzfeldt–Jakob disease, Gerstmann–Sträussler–Scheinker syndrome, and fatal familial insomnia. Prions are misfolded proteins, that cause other proteins to misfold, and build up in the brain.

=== Alcohol-related ===
Alcohol-related dementia, occurs as a result of alcohol-related brain damage due to alcoholism. Different factors can be involved in this development including thiamine deficiency and age vulnerability. A degree of brain damage is seen in more than 70% of cases of alcoholism. Brain regions affected are similar to those that are affected by aging, and also by Alzheimer's. Regions showing loss of volume include the frontal, temporal, and parietal lobes, as well as the cerebellum, thalamus, and hippocampus. This loss can be more notable, with greater cognitive impairments seen in those aged 65 years and over.

=== Conditions with dementia-like symptoms ===
Autoimmune dementias of autoimmune disorder origin can mimic subtypes of dementia. They are potentially treatable if recognized and can have a good response to immunotherapy.

Cases of easily reversible dementia include hormone and vitamin deficiencies, and infections such as Lyme disease, and neurosyphilis.

Congenital genetic disorders that can also cause symptoms of dementia are known as inborn errors of metabolism.

== Diagnosis ==
The symptoms of dementia may vary depending on the underlying subtype, and between individuals, particularly in the early stages but at the end stage of all types they are similar. Diagnosis by symptoms alone is difficult, made more so when there is more than one type. A medical history will be taken, and cognitive testing carried out. Blood tests can rule out possible treatable causes such as vitamin deficiencies and hormone imbalances, or rule in probable Alzheimer's. One or more types of scan may also be needed. The DSM5 (2013) published by the American Psychiatric Association gives the diagnostic criteria for a primary dementia as the recognition of a significant decline in one or more cognitive domains that interfere with the ability to carry out everyday activities; the cognitive deficits are not exclusive to delirium, and are not explained by mental disorders such as schizophrenia, and major depressive disorder.

A number of brief cognitive tests (5–15 minutes) are available that are reasonably reliable but results need to take into account the influence of a person's educational level. The mini–mental state examination (MMSE) is the best studied and most commonly used test. This is useful in diagnosis if the results are interpreted along with an assessment of a person's personality, their ability to perform activities of daily living, and their behavior. Other cognitive tests include the abbreviated mental test score (AMTS), the modified mini–mental state examination (3MS), the Cognitive Abilities Screening Instrument (CASI), the Trail-making test, and the clock drawing test.The Montreal Cognitive Assessment (MoCA) is a reliable screening test and is freely available online in many languages. The MoCA has also been shown to be somewhat better at detecting mild cognitive impairment than the MMSE. An adapted version is available, suitable for those with hearing loss, that avoids the need for people to listen and respond to questions. RUDAS, the Rowland Universal Dementia Assessment Scale, is a short dementia screening test for use in diverse multi-ethnic communities designed to overcome language and cultural differences. An integrated cognitive assessment (CognICA) is a five-minute test that is highly sensitive to the early stages of dementia, and uses a mobile app deliverable to an iPad. Previously in use in the UK, in 2021 CognICA was given FDA approval for its commercial use as a medical device.

Informant-based questionnaires are also widely used to gain a better understanding of the types and severity of cognitive decline, and also of behavioral changes. Possibly the best known is the Informant Questionnaire on Cognitive Decline in the Elderly. A well-established one used to capture behavioral changes is the Neuropsychiatric Inventory (NPI). A similar scale based on the NPI is the Cambridge Behavioural Inventory which has been shown to be able to differentiate the neurodegenerative disorders by grouping common behavioral symptoms. The General Practitioner Assessment Of Cognition combines a patient assessment with an informant interview, designed for use in the primary care setting. The AD-8, an informant assessment for dementia screening questionnaire using eight items, is used to assess changes in function related to cognitive decline and is potentially useful, but is not diagnostic, is variable, and has risk of bias.

Depressive cognitive disorders (previously known as pseudodementias) include symptoms of depression, commonly found in dementia, and delirium. In contrast to dementia, cognitive dysfunction in delirium is marked by a sudden onset with a much shorter duration. Machine learning and artificial intelligence have the potential to enhance assessment.

Individuals diagnosed with dementia, particularly in the early stages, may face an elevated risk of suicide. The risk of suicide is significantly higher within the first three months and up to a year after a dementia diagnosis, especially among those diagnosed before the age of 65.

=== Imaging ===
Neuroimaging techniques are commonly used to rule out reversible causes of dementia such as normal pressure hydrocephalus (a build up of cerebrospinal fluid in the ventricles). Scans can also show if the cause is a tumor, or show evidence of a stroke which would indicate vascular dementia. PET-CT scans (functioning and structural, respectively) are useful in differentiating types of dementia. A PET scan that uses a radiotracer, commonly FDG can highlight areas of low glucose metabolism in the brain. A pattern of reduced glucose metabolism shown in the temporal and parietal lobes is indicative of Alzheimer's, other patterns are particular to FTD or to LBD. Amyloid imaging (amyloid PET) uses a radiotracer that binds to amyloid plaques (large numbers are a hallmark feature of Alzheimer's) to provide detailed images of the distribution of amyloid. This can show up years, even decades, before the onset of symptoms. Serial amyloid imaging shows amyloid beta deposits firstly in the anterior temporal areas that then spread to the frontal and medial parietal regions, the associative neocortex, and then to the primary sensorimotor areas and subcortical regions.

== Prevention ==
=== Risk factors ===
In 2017, nine risk factors for dementia were recognized. These were, lower levels of education, high blood pressure, hearing impairment, smoking, obesity, depression, physical inactivity, diabetes, and low social contact. In 2020 the reviewed report added three more – excessive alcohol use, traumatic brain injury and air pollution. The 2024 report added two more of untreated visual impairment, and high LDL cholesterol. Other psychological features, including certain personality traits (high neuroticism, and low conscientiousness), low purpose in life, and feeling lonely, are also risk factors. For example, based on the English Longitudinal Study of Ageing (ELSA), research found that loneliness (but not social isolation) in older people can increase the risk of dementia by one-third. Living alone can double the risk of dementia but this may be reduced by having two or more closer relationships. Multi-risk factor burden is higher in lower income countries, and in lower socioeconomic groups resulting in earlier development of dementia. Some of the risk factors such as diabetes and high blood pressure may also be present as comorbidities.

Many of the risk factors are potentially modifiable. They include some that may be only partially causal but if they were all addressed nearly half of dementia cases could be prevented. And a decreased risk is also possible for those with a genetic risk. Depression may be seen as a prodromal symptom or as a modifiable risk factor. The two most modifiable risk factors for dementia are physical inactivity and lack of cognitive stimulation. Physical activity, in particular aerobic exercise, is associated with a reduction in age-related brain tissue loss, and neurotoxic factors. Cognitive activity strengthens neural plasticity and together they help to support cognitive reserve. Multicomponent therapy (MCT) including aerobics, balance training, and strength training, has been shown to improve independence for activities of daily living and quality of life. MCT also helps to minimize the risk of falls.

Impaired vision and hearing in later life, are modifiable risk factors. These impairments may precede cognitive symptoms by many years. Hearing loss may lead to another risk factor of social isolation which negatively affects cognition. Age-related hearing loss is characterised by slowed central processing of auditory information. Worldwide, mid-life hearing loss may account for around 9% of dementia cases. Hearing loss is not a recognised risk factor for vascular dementia.

Sarcopenia (age-related muscle loss) and resulting frailty may increase the risk of cognitive decline, and dementia, and the inverse also holds of cognitive impairment increasing the risk of frailty. Prevention of frailty may help to prevent cognitive decline.

There are no medications available that can prevent cognitive decline and dementia. An economic model (of 2024) has proposed that population-level interventions in England that target dementia risk factors such as high blood pressure, smoking and obesity, could save money and give people extra years in good health. For example, reduced salt in food, to address hypertension, could give 39,433 quality-adjusted life-years and save £2.4 billion.

=== Diet ===
A modifiable risk factor for dementia is diet. The Mediterranean and DASH diets are both associated with less cognitive decline. A different approach has been to incorporate elements of both of these diets into one known as the MIND diet. These diets are generally low in saturated fats while providing a good source of carbohydrates, mainly those of a low glycemic index that help stabilize blood sugar and insulin levels. The MIND diet may be more protective but further studies are needed. The Mediterranean diet seems to be more protective against Alzheimer's than DASH but there are no consistent findings against dementia in general.

Research has found that adding olive oil (a major component of DASH and Mediterranean), to the diet improves cognitive functioning in the older population. And that the regular consumption of olive oil over time has the potential to improve cognitive function, and to lower the risk of, or to delay or even prevent the onset of cognitive disorders. More studies are needed to give an understanding of how olive oil impacts aspects of cognition.

Nutritional factors associated with the proposed diets for reducing dementia risk include unsaturated fatty acids, vitamin E, vitamin C, flavonoids, vitamin B, and vitamin D. Omega-3 fatty acids may help in treating the common symptom of depression, and a potential risk factor for dementia.

==== Dental health ====
Poor oral health has not been identified as a known risk factor for dementia but there is evidence for its association with cognitive decline. Different factors have been proposed including inflammatory gum diseases, and tooth loss that impairs proper chewing of food, impacting diet and quality of life. Oral health declines with advancing cognitive impairment, due in part to an increased inability to maintain daily self-care, and also barriers to dental care access. Increasing evidence indicates that poor oral health may be more than just a result of dementia and could be a causative factor.

== Management ==
=== Medications ===
Donepezil

There are limited pharmacological options and several non-pharmacological options for treating dementia, and no available options to delay the onset or stop the progression. Some types of medication are used to address the symptoms in different subtypes but the benefit is small.

Donepezil is a cholinesterase inhibitor (ChEI) that acts to increase the amount of the neurotransmitter acetylcholine. In treating the symptoms of Alzheimer's moderate quality evidence shows that it provides small improvements in cognition, daily functioning, and global clinical state, with higher doses slightly increasing benefit but also adverse events. Rivastigmine another ChEI is recommended for treating symptoms in Parkinson's disease dementia.

Memantine provides a small but consistent benefit for moderate-to-severe Alzheimer's disease, and can be used together with a cholinesterase inhibitor, but shows no clear benefit in mild Alzheimer's and may increase adverse events, with limited evidence for other dementias.

Medications that have anticholinergic effects increase all-cause mortality in people with dementia, although the effect of these medications on cognitive function remains uncertain, according to a systematic review published in 2021.

Before prescribing antipsychotic (neuroleptic) medication in the elderly, an assessment for an underlying cause of the behavior is needed. Severe and life-threatening reactions occur in almost half of people with Lewy body dementia, can be fatal after a single dose, and can give a risk for developing neuroleptic malignant syndrome, a rare life-threatening illness. Antipsychotic drugs are used to treat dementia only if non-drug therapies have not worked, and the person's actions threaten themselves or others. Aggressive behavior changes are sometimes the result of other solvable problems, that could make treatment with antipsychotics unnecessary. Because people with dementia can be aggressive, resistant to their treatment, and otherwise disruptive, sometimes antipsychotic drugs are considered as a therapy in response. These drugs have risky adverse effects, including increasing the person's chance of stroke and death. Given these adverse events and small benefit antipsychotics are avoided whenever possible. Generally, stopping antipsychotics for people with dementia does not cause problems, even in those who have been on them a long time.

An extract of Ginkgo biloba known as EGb 761 has been widely used for treating mild to moderate dementia and other neuropsychiatric disorders. Its use is approved throughout Europe. The World Federation of Biological Psychiatry guidelines lists EGb 761 with the same weight of evidence (level B) given to acetylcholinesterase inhibitors, and memantine. EGb 761 is the only one that showed improvement of symptoms in both AD and vascular dementia. EGb 761 is seen as being able to play an important role either on its own or as an add-on particularly when other therapies prove ineffective. EGb 761 is seen to be neuroprotective; it is a free radical scavenger, improves mitochondrial function, and modulates serotonin and dopamine levels. Many studies of its use in mild to moderate dementia have shown it to significantly improve cognitive function, activities of daily living, neuropsychiatric symptoms, and quality of life.

There is a complex interplay between the use of antidepressants, the severity of dementia, and the degree of cognitive decline, particularly with the use of SSRIs that warrants further research. The use of antidepressants is associated with a faster rate of cognitive decline. Greater cognitive decline is in line with the severity of dementia. Also higher doses are associated with greater cognitive decline and with the risk of severe dementia, and fractures.

No evidence supports the use of vitamin or mineral supplements including B vitamins to improve cognitive impairment. No evidence supports the use of statins to prevent dementia. There is insufficient evidence for the use of antihypertensives to prevent cognitive decline, and dementia. Medications for other health conditions may need to be managed differently for someone with dementia; the MATCH-D tool may be used for this.

==== Sleep disturbances ====
Over 40% of people with dementia report sleep problems. Approaches to treating these sleep problems include medications and non-pharmacological approaches. The use of medications to alleviate sleep disturbances has not been well researched, even for medications that are commonly prescribed. In 2012 the American Geriatrics Society recommended that benzodiazepines such as diazepam, and non-benzodiazepine sleeping pills, be avoided for people with dementia due to the risks of increased cognitive impairment and falls. Benzodiazepines are also known to promote delirium. Additionally, little evidence supports the effectiveness of benzodiazepines in this population. No clear evidence shows that melatonin or ramelteon improves sleep for people with dementia due to Alzheimer's, but it is used to treat REM sleep behavior disorder in dementia with Lewy bodies. Limited evidence suggests that a low dose of trazodone may improve sleep, however more research is needed.

Non-pharmacological approaches have been suggested but there is no strong evidence or firm conclusions on the effectiveness of different types of interventions, especially for those who are living in an institutionalized setting such as a nursing home or long-term care home. A sleep management programme may be useful that includes sleep hygiene education, exercise and tailored activities.

==== Pain ====
Pain in those with moderate to severe dementia is often overlooked and poorly assessed since they become incapable of communicating their pain. Nearly 80% of those with dementia in nursing homes may experience pain that is difficult to communicate, and it may be expressed as a behavioral symptom. Persistent pain has functional implications, it can lead to decreased mobility, depression, sleep disturbances, impaired appetite, exacerbation of cognitive impairment and contribute to falls. Caregivers can learn to recognize and assess the pain cues. The use of a Pain Assessment in Advanced Dementia scale, can help healthcare workers in their care of those with advanced dementia.

==== Communication ====
The ability of people with dementia to speak or otherwise communicate may become impaired, and they may seem unable to understand what is said to them and have trouble communicating their needs. Communication challenges affect not only the administration of pain medication but also hydration, nutrition, and all aspects of physical and emotional care. Formal caregivers may also find it hard to form relationships with those they care for because of the communication barrier.

For people with dementia who have lost their speech, nonverbal communication can be used. Paying attention to eye movements, facial expressions, and body movements can help caregivers understand them better. As each person is affected by dementia differently, a unique form of communication may need to be established. People with dementia living in long-term care homes typically have high rates of hearing loss which can further impair communication between them and staff. However, various barriers, including a lack of knowledge and time pressure, often prevent staff from providing adequate hearing care.

=== Non-pharmacological options ===
More than half of people with dementia may experience neuropsychiatric (psychological or behavioral) symptoms such as agitation, sleep problems, aggression, and psychosis. Treatment for these symptoms is aimed at reducing the person's distress and keeping them safe. The most promising non-pharmacological approach for evaluating neuropsychiatric symptoms is the DICE interaction – Describe, Investigate, Create, and Evaluate followed by caregiver training. Severe behavioral symptoms might result in a hospital admission for psychiatric assessment, care and treatment.

Cognitive and behavioral interventions rather than medication appear to be better for agitation and aggression. Cognitive rehabilitation may be effective in helping those with mild to moderate dementia in managing their daily activities. In 2025 and 2026, several meta-analyses suggested that mind–body exercises (including mindfulness-based exercises, yoga, and tai chi, which integrate physical movement, controlled breathing, and focused attention) may provide benefits for individuals with dementia.

Other non-pharmacological interventions for use in nursing homes include Montessori-based programmes. Indicators for depression may use a Cornell Scale for Depression in Dementia (CSDD) Exercise programs are beneficial with respect to activities of daily living. Many behavioral and psychological symptoms may be improved by non-pharmacological measures with higher ranking interventions given as massage therapy, personally-tailored therapy, animal-assisted therapy, and pet robot use. Massage and touch therapy may improve agitation and behavioral problems with hand, head and foot massage showing a significant improvement in agitation.

There are mixed findings in the use of cannabinoids in treating some of the symptoms of dementia.

Often overlooked in treating and managing dementia is the role of the caregiver and what is known about how they can support multiple interventions. Healthcare workers do not have sufficient tools or clinical guidance for the behavioral and psychological symptoms of dementia along with medication use. Simple measures like talking to people about their interests can improve the quality of life for care home residents and may reduce symptoms of agitation and depression. They also needed fewer GP visits and hospital admissions, which also meant that the programme was cost-saving.

==== Psychological and psychosocial therapies ====
Psychological therapies for dementia include some limited evidence for reminiscence therapy (namely, some positive effects in the areas of quality of life, cognition, communication and mood – the first three particularly in care home settings), some benefit for cognitive reframing for caretakers, unclear evidence for validation therapy and evidence for improvements including in communication and social interaction in cognitive stimulation programs for people with mild to moderate dementia. Offering personally tailored activities may help reduce challenging behavior and may improve quality of life.

Dementia impairs normal communication and agitated behavior is often used to indicate pain, illness, or overstimulation. The strongest evidence for non-pharmacological therapies for the management of changed behaviors in dementia is for using such approaches. Low quality evidence suggests that regular (at least five sessions of) music therapy may help care home residents. It may reduce depressive symptoms and improve overall behaviors. It may also supply a beneficial effect on emotional well-being and quality of life, as well as reduce anxiety. In 2003, The Alzheimer's Society in the UK introduced 'Singing for the Brain', establishing a model for group singing of well-known songs (for those with dementia and their carers) that also incorporates vocal exercises for the improvement of brain activity and well-being.

Some London hospitals found that using color, designs, pictures and lights helped people with dementia adjust to being at the hospital. These adjustments to the layout of the dementia wings at these hospitals helped patients by preventing confusion.

Life story work as part of reminiscence therapy, and video biographies have been found to address the needs of clients and their caregivers in various ways, offering the client the opportunity to leave a legacy and enhance their personhood and also benefitting youth who participate in such work. Such interventions can be more beneficial when undertaken at a relatively early stage of dementia. They may also be problematic in those who have difficulties in processing past experiences.

Animal-assisted therapy particularly with the use of dogs, has been found to be helpful.

Occupational therapy also addresses psychological and psychosocial needs of patients with dementia through improving daily occupational performance and caregivers' competence. When compensatory intervention strategies are added to their daily routine, the level of performance is enhanced and reduces the burden commonly placed on their caregivers.

==== Person-centered care ====
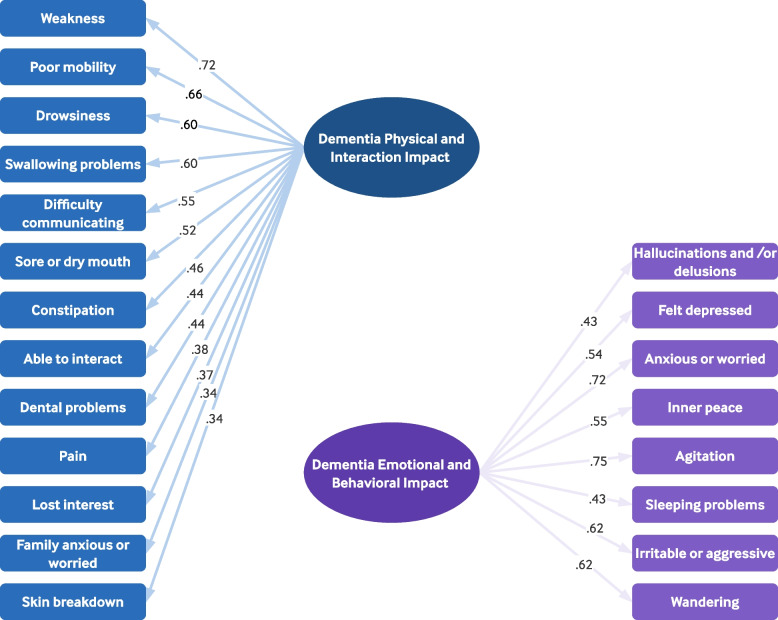
IPOS-Dem subscales used in assessments of symptoms and concerns in advanced dementia care

Person-centered care (different from patient participation), takes into account the individual's needs, preferences, experiences, and values, by building up a personal relationship. This is especially important as the approach aims to maintain the dignity of people with dementia and sense of identity throughout the course of their illness. Person-centered care interventions could not only reduce agitation, neuropsychiatric symptoms, and depression but also help improve the quality of life for people with dementia. Moreover, the potential benefits of a person-centered care approach for dementia care workers have been reported, indicating its effectiveness in reducing stress, burnout, and job dissatisfaction.

Person-centered outcome measures (PCOMs) are standardized, validated questionnaires that measure people's opinions of their own health and well-being. They emphasize person-centered care by focusing on the symptoms and concerns that are most important to people and their families. PCOMs may be self-reported (when the person with dementia completes the questionnaire) or proxy-reported (when the questionnaire is completed by someone who knows them well). Proxy-reported PCOMs are used in more advanced stages of dementia when the person is no longer able to self report. Used in routine care, PCOMs support systematic assessment and monitoring of an individual's health and wellbeing, enable shared decision-making, enable changes in care provision (such as improved communication or referral to other services), improve outcomes (such as improved symptom management) and enable evaluation of care provision. The Integrated Palliative Care Outcome Scale for Dementia (IPOS-Dem) is a comprehensive palliative dementia PCOM, used to measure symptoms and concerns for people with dementia and their family.

Adult daycare centers as well as special care units in nursing homes often provide specialized care. Daycare centers offer supervision, recreation, meals, and limited health care to participants, as well as providing respite for caregivers. In addition, home care can provide one-to-one support and care in the home allowing for more individualized attention that is needed as the disorder progresses.

=== Exercise ===
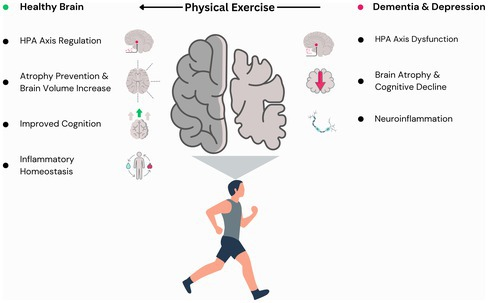
Modulatory effects of physical exercise on depression and dementia

Exercise programs may improve the ability of people with dementia to perform daily activities, but the best type of exercise is still unclear.

=== Assistive technology and digital health ===
Assistive technologies may be used to improve the quality of life for individuals with dementia, support their independence, and assist caregivers. These technologies include home automation systems, digital assistive tools, and wearable sensors. Virtual reality is also being explored as a powerful technology to elicit memories and to improve wellbeing.

Technology has the potential to be a valuable intervention for alleviating loneliness and promoting social connections. It could facilitate activities of daily living, and provide ways to connect people that are geographically distant.

Other types of developed technologies to aid services include telehealth or telemedicine services, using digital communication for delivery of health-related services and information through phone calls, mobile apps, and video conferencing.

Telemedicine has given results for cognitive assessment and diagnosis that are similar to in-person visits, and it has also helped improve outcomes after rehabilitation. Telemedicine is often well received by people affected by dementia who can rely on the support of staff and family to navigate the technology. While it has potential to widen access to services, those with sensory impairment may be excluded.

Digital health interventions can play a role in supporting family caregivers of people with dementia, by offering a source of support from connective platforms, with 24/7 accessibility, as well as opportunity for remote monitoring. However, challenges such as the digital divide, privacy concerns and the need for greater personalisation for individual users are recognised issues.

Remotely delivered interventions including support, training and information may reduce the burden for the informal caregiver and improve their depressive symptoms.

In several localities in Japan, digital surveillance may be made available to family members, if a person with dementia is prone to wandering and going missing.

=== Mental health care ===
People living with dementia can have co‑existing mental health problems, but these comorbidities are often underdiagnosed. Behavioural and psychological symptoms of dementia (BPSD) which can include agitation, aggression, irritability and apathy are very common. These symptoms can escalate rapidly and lead to crisis situations and a breakdown of care at home or whilst in a care setting, prompting the need for specialist assessment and support. It is therefore important for people living with dementia to seek support early for emerging mental health problems as they can worsen without timely assessment and support.

=== Palliative care ===
Palliative care, the total care given by a team of health care providers can be helpful to both the individual and the caregiver. It aims to improve quality of life, at all stages. It can help people with dementia and their caregivers to understand what to expect, deal with loss of physical and mental abilities, support the person's wishes and goals including surrogate decision making, and discuss wishes for or against CPR and life support. Palliative care interventions may lead to improvements in the quality of life, management of symptoms, and comfort in dying, but it is not yet known how it can be best used to support people dying with advanced dementia and their families.

Because there is uncertainty around how and when people with dementia decline, and because most people prefer to allow the person with dementia to make their own decisions, palliative care involvement before the late stages of dementia is recommended.

In the early stages of dementia, palliative care can involve advocacy around establishing goals of care in the future, reassurance of continued support, planning for future scenarios of care and establishing long-term relationships with care providers. In later stages, a palliative approach to dementia care may have specific benefit to goals of care and end-of-life conversations, symptom management, prescribing practices and emergency department visits.

Towards the end of life, without palliative care, people often present to the emergency department. Community palliative care is associated without this need. End-of-life care outcomes at home, such as neuropsychiatric symptoms may be improved.

People with advanced dementia may not readily receive specialist palliative care input. Reasons for this are varied but may include lack of agreement of when to refer people with dementia, and a lack of coordination across care settings, communication challenges, limited training opportunities for healthcare staff and because dementia is considered to be a life-limiting condition. Dementia is often thought to be a normal ageing process and not recognized as a terminal condition. Further research is needed to determine the appropriate palliative care interventions and how they can be implemented.

== Distribution ==
Dementia death rates

The number of cases of dementia worldwide in 2021 was estimated at 57 million, with close to 10 million new cases each year. This number is estimated to double every 20 years. Another estimate gives the number of people worldwide with dementia to reach over 150 million by 2050. Over 60% live in low and middle income countries, with women being more impacted. Globally, the fastest increase in serious health-related suffering by 2060 is expected to occur among people with dementia.

In 2021 there were 1.8 million deaths from dementia making it the seventh leading cause of death. This is expected to increase to 4.91 million by 2050. In Europe, Finland has the highest mortality rate from dementia in the world.

Around 7% of people over the age of 65 have dementia, with rates up to 10%, in places with relatively high life expectancy. The prevalence of dementia differs in different world regions; in 2015, there were an estimated 10.4 million cases in Europe; 9.4 million cases in the Americas; 4 million in Africa, and 22.9 million in Asia.

Almost half of new dementia cases occur in Asia, followed by Europe (25%), the Americas (18%) and Africa (8%). The incidence of dementia increases exponentially with age, doubling with every 6.3-year increase in age. The disease trajectory is varied and the median time from diagnosis to death depends strongly on age at diagnosis, from 6.7 years for people diagnosed aged 60–69 to 1.9 years for people diagnosed at 90 or older.

=== Inequalities ===
Inequalities are observed in the risk of developing dementia, in its timely diagnosis, in access to care, and in support. There is also less funding available for dementia research, and less support for the carers.

On a global level, people in low-and middle-income countries have fewer available facilities and services, and have greater difficulties accessing these than people living in high-income countries. Low socioeconomic status has a greater risk burden for the development of dementia and is also associated with earlier cognitive decline. In the most deprived areas of a country more hospitalisations, and emergency department visits are noted. Inappropriate medications may be prescribed and there is a higher one year mortality rate.

On a national level, people with dementia might have unequal access to care based on where they live. This can manifest on a regional level, with people in rural areas facing more difficulties than those in urban areas. Inequalities can also affect smaller local units as well, for example people living in the same city might receive different or less frequent care based on their postcodes or the street they live in.

A diagnosis of dementia is difficult for the individual and the carers, and post-diagnostic support is often variable, and care options difficult to navigate. There is often a perceived disparity in care between dementia and other life-limiting conditions. Social stigma is commonly perceived by those with the condition, and also by their caregivers.

Significant differences in dementia incidence, risk, and care exist in racial and ethnic minorities. These groups are often more affected by dementia risk factors, for example having high blood pressure. Those coming from a minority background often receive lower quality dementia care, they are less likely to get anti-dementia medications compared to their White counterparts. Furthermore, when they are prescribed medication, they are less likely to adhere to the treatment due to various factors and barriers such as the quality of interaction with healthcare providers, distrust in doctors, worries about retaining personal autonomy, stigmas and different beliefs.

Globally, women are much more impacted by dementia than men. Two in three people with dementia are women. Yet, medical data from women are lacking compared to men. Women are more likely to care for another person with dementia (in the workforce and informally). The proportion of women caregivers in low and middle income countries is higher. Gender disparities exist towards the end-of-life in caregiving experiences.

=== By country ===
==== United Kingdom ====
Estimates show that in 2024 there were nearly a million people living with dementia in the UK, with more than 800 000 in England. This is expected to rise to 1.4 million by 2040, with numbers doubling in England.

In 2022 and 2023, dementia was the leading cause of death in England and Wales.

==== United States ====
Deaths from dementia in the U.S. tripled in the period from 1999-2020, rising from around 150,000 in 1999 to over 450,000 in 2020, and the likelihood of dying from dementia increased across all demographic groups. In 2024 dementia was the fifth leading cause of death in the U.S.

The genetic and environmental risk factors for dementia disorders vary by ethnicity. For instance, Alzheimer's disease among Hispanic/Latino and African American subjects exhibit lower risks associated with gene changes in the apolipoprotein E gene than do non-Hispanic white subjects.

In the United States in 2017, over 37% of dementia cases were associated with cardiometabolic conditions, though the risk varies across regions. The eight key contributors were diabetes, heart failure, atrial fibrillation, coronary artery disease, heart attacks, strokes, hypertension and high cholesterol. Among these, stroke was the most significant factor, doubling the risk of developing dementia (2.2 times higher), followed closely by heart failure (2.1 times) and hypertension (78% increased risk). In contrast, high cholesterol had the weakest correlation, associated with a 27% increased risk. However, there were also geographic disparities, and individuals living in the U.S. South faced a higher likelihood of dementia related to cardiovascular conditions and diabetes.

==== Australia ====
In Australia in 2024 there were an estimated 425,000 cases of dementia. In 2023 dementia was the leading cause of death for women, and the second leading for men. In 2023 there were 17,400 deaths which rose to 17,847 in 2024.

==== Japan ====
Japan's Basic Act on Dementia to Promote an Inclusive Society took effect on January 1, 2024. The Cabinet approved a Basic Plan for the Promotion of Policies on Dementia on December 3, 2024; the plan sets out measures under the Act and four priority goals for its first phase.

== History ==
Until the end of the 19th century, dementia was a much broader clinical concept. It included mental illness and any type of psychosocial incapacity, including reversible conditions. Dementia at this time simply referred to anyone who had lost the ability to reason, and was applied equally to psychosis, organic brain diseases like neurosyphilis, and to the senile dementia associated with old age.

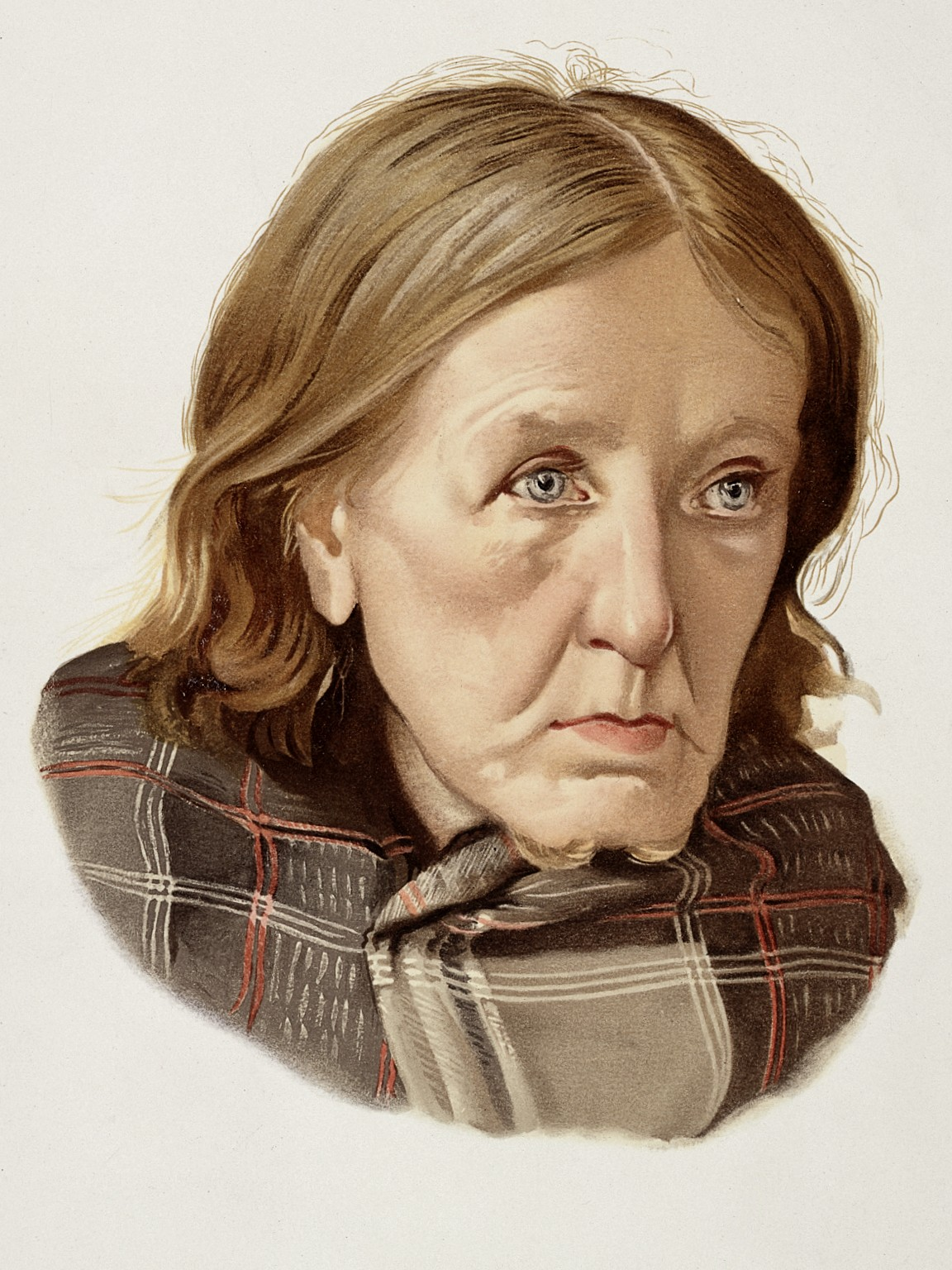
A 19th-century drawing of a woman diagnosed with dementia

Dementia has been referred to in medical texts since antiquity. One of the earliest known allusions to dementia is attributed to the 7th-century BC Greek philosopher Pythagoras, who divided the human lifespan into five distinct phases with the last two described as the "senium", a period of mental and physical decay. In 550 BC, the Athenian statesman and poet Solon argued that the terms of a man's will might be invalidated if he exhibited loss of judgement due to advanced age. Chinese medical texts made allusions to the condition as well, and the characters for "dementia" translate literally to "foolish old person".

Athenian philosophers Aristotle and Plato discussed the mental decline that can come with old age and predicted that this affects everyone who becomes old and nothing can be done to stop this decline from taking place. Plato specifically talked about how the elderly should not be in positions that require responsibility because, "There is not much acumen of the mind that once carried them in their youth, those characteristics one would call judgement, imagination, power of reasoning, and memory. They see them gradually blunted by deterioration and can hardly fulfill their function."

For comparison, the Roman statesman Cicero held a view much more in line with modern-day medical wisdom that loss of mental function was not inevitable in the elderly and could be staved off by remaining mentally active and eager to learn new things. However, Cicero's views on aging, although progressive, were largely ignored in a world that would be dominated for centuries by Aristotle's medical writings. Physicians during the Roman Empire, such as Galen and Celsus, simply repeated the beliefs of Aristotle while adding few new contributions to medical knowledge.

Byzantine physicians sometimes wrote of dementia. It is recorded that at least seven emperors whose lifespans exceeded 70 years displayed signs of cognitive decline. In Constantinople, special hospitals housed those diagnosed with dementia or insanity, but these did not apply to the emperors, who were above the law and whose health conditions could not be publicly acknowledged.

Poets, playwrights, and other writers made frequent allusions to the loss of mental function in old age. William Shakespeare notably mentions it in the plays Hamlet and King Lear.

During the 19th century, doctors generally came to believe that elderly dementia was the result of cerebral atherosclerosis, although opinions fluctuated between the idea that it was due to blockage of the major arteries supplying the brain or small strokes within the vessels of the cerebral cortex.

In 1907, Bavarian psychiatrist Alois Alzheimer was the first to identify and describe the characteristics of progressive dementia in the brain of 51-year-old Auguste Deter. Deter had begun to behave uncharacteristically, including accusing her husband of adultery, neglecting household chores, exhibiting difficulties writing and engaging in conversations, heightened insomnia, and loss of directional sense. At one point, Deter was reported to have "dragged a bed sheet outside, wandered around wildly, and cried for hours at midnight". Alzheimer began treating Deter when she entered a Frankfurt mental hospital on November 25, 1901. During her ongoing treatment, Deter and her husband struggled to afford the cost of the medical care, and Alzheimer agreed to continue her treatment in exchange for Deter's medical records and donation of her brain upon death. Deter died on April 8, 1906, after succumbing to sepsis and pneumonia. Alzheimer conducted the brain biopsy using the Bielschowsky stain method, which was a new development at the time, and he observed senile plaques, neurofibrillary tangles, and atherosclerotic alteration. At the time, the consensus among medical doctors had been that senile plaques were generally found in older patients, and the occurrence of neurofibrillary tangles was an entirely new observation at the time. Alzheimer presented his findings at the 37th psychiatry conference of southwestern Germany in Tübingen on April 11, 1906; however, the information was poorly received by his peers. By 1910, Alois Alzheimer's teacher, Emil Kraepelin, published a book in which he coined the term "Alzheimer's disease" in an attempt to acknowledge the importance of Alzheimer's discovery.

By the 1960s, the link between neurodegenerative diseases and age-related cognitive decline had become more established. By the 1970s, the medical community maintained that vascular dementia was rarer than previously thought and Alzheimer's disease caused the vast majority of old age mental impairments. More recently however, it is believed that dementia is often a mixture of conditions.

In 1976, neurologist Robert Katzmann suggested a link between senile dementia and Alzheimer's disease. He suggested that much of the senile dementia occurring (by definition) after the age of 65, was pathologically identical with Alzheimer's disease occurring in people under 65 and therefore should not be treated differently. Katzmann proposed that Alzheimer's disease, if taken to occur over age 65, is actually common, not rare, and was the fourth- or fifth leading cause of death, even though rarely reported on death certificates in 1976.

A helpful finding was that although the incidence of Alzheimer's disease increased with age (from 5–10% of 75-year-olds to as many as 40–50% of 90-year-olds), no threshold was found by which age all persons developed it. This is shown by documented supercentenarians (people living to 110 or more) who experienced no substantial cognitive impairment. Some evidence suggests that dementia is most likely to develop between ages 80 and 84 and individuals who pass that point without being affected have a lower chance of developing it. Women account for a larger percentage of dementia cases than men. This can be attributed in part to their longer overall lifespan and greater odds of attaining an age where the condition is likely to occur.

Much like other diseases associated with aging, dementia was comparatively rare before the 20th century, because few people lived past 80. Conversely, syphilitic dementia was widespread in the developed world until it was largely eradicated by the use of penicillin after World War II. With significant increases in life expectancy thereafter, the number of people over 65 started rapidly climbing. While elderly persons constituted an average of 3–5% of the population prior to 1945, by 2010 many countries reached 10–14% and in Germany and Japan, this figure exceeded 20%. Public awareness of Alzheimer's Disease greatly increased in 1994 when former US president Ronald Reagan announced that he had been diagnosed with the condition.

In the 21st century, other types of dementia were differentiated from Alzheimer's disease and vascular dementias (the most common types). This differentiation is on the basis of pathological examination of brain tissues, by symptomatology, and by different patterns of brain metabolic activity in nuclear medical imaging tests such as SPECT and PET scans of the brain. The various forms have differing prognoses and differing epidemiologic risk factors.

=== Terminology ===
Dementia derives from demens meaning out of mind. In the elderly it was once called senile dementia or senility which are now outdated terms. The condition was viewed as a normal and somewhat inevitable aspect of aging.

By 1913–20 the term dementia praecox was introduced to suggest the development of senile-type dementia at a younger age. Eventually the two terms fused, so that until 1952 physicians used the terms dementia praecox (precocious dementia) and schizophrenia interchangeably. Since then, science has determined that dementia and schizophrenia are two different disorders, though they share some similarities. The term precocious dementia for a mental illness suggested that a type of mental illness like schizophrenia (including paranoia and decreased cognitive capacity) could be expected to arrive normally in all persons with greater age (see paraphrenia). After about 1920, the beginning use of dementia for what is now understood as schizophrenia and senile dementia helped limit the word's meaning to "permanent, irreversible mental deterioration". This began the change to the later use of the term and researchers have seen a connection between those diagnosed with schizophrenia and patients who are diagnosed with dementia, finding a positive correlation between the two diseases.

The view that dementia must always be the result of a particular disease process led for a time to the proposed diagnosis of "senile dementia of the Alzheimer's type" (SDAT) in persons over the age of 65, with "Alzheimer's disease" diagnosed in persons younger than 65 who had the same pathology. Eventually, however, it was agreed that the age limit was artificial, and that Alzheimer's disease was the appropriate term for persons with that particular brain pathology, regardless of age.

After 1952, mental illnesses including schizophrenia were removed from the category of organic brain syndromes, and thus (by definition) removed from possible causes of "dementing illnesses" (dementias). At the same, however, the traditional cause of senile dementia – "hardening of the arteries" – now returned as a set of dementias of vascular cause (small strokes). These were now termed multi-infarct dementias or vascular dementias.

== Society and culture ==
The societal cost of dementia is high, especially for caregivers. Research conducted in the UK shows that almost two out of three carers of people with dementia feel lonely. Most of the carers in the study were family members or friends. Informal carers are at higher risk of developing psychological and physical conditions.

Among people aged 60 years and over, dementia was ranked in 2010 as the 9th most burdensome condition. The World Health Organization's (WHO) global action plan on the public health response to dementia (2017–2025) set a target for 75% of WHO Member States (194 countries) to develop a policy or plan for dementia by 2025. These plans recognize that people can live well with dementia for years, as long as the right support and timely access to a diagnosis are available. However, in 2025, only 23% of Member States (45 countries) have a national policy for dementia.

=== Financial costs ===
The financial costs of care in people with dementia are high and increase over the stages reached. Nursing home care, and informal care costs are among the highest cost components. The estimated costs of care in low- and middle-income countries are lower than those in high-income countries with 42% met by direct care costs, and 58% met by informal care. These estimates are likely an under-representation, as there have been limited research studies in these countries, particularly in low-income countries.

The global cost of dementia was around US$1.3 trillion in 2021.

In the USA total costs in 2025 was around US$384 billion not including the estimated US$413 billion in informal care costs. The lifetime cost of dementia care in 2024 was estimated at US$405,262.

In 2024 the annual cost per person with dementia in the United Kingdom ranged from £28,700 at the mild stage rising to £80,500 at the moderate stage. For the total population the annual estimated cost in 2024 was £42.5 billion which is expected to reach £90.3 billion by 2040. More than 60% of these costs are paid by people with dementia and their family caregivers. People with dementia spend an average of £100,000 on their own care over their lifetime.

=== Awareness ===
A worldwide study in 2019 showed that about 66% of the general public believe that dementia is a normal part of aging, and not a disorder, and 62% of healthcare professionals also held this view. A follow-up study in 2024 showed that this figure had increased to 80% in the general public and to 65% among healthcare workers. In 2022, only 42% of surveyed public in England knew that dementia is a terminal condition, and over 90% were unaware that dementia was the leading cause of death in their country. There is also persistent stigma, which can be a barrier for people seeking help for dementia and accessing care. In 2024 88% of people living with dementia reported experiencing discrimination, an increase of 5% from 2019. Over 64% of the general public believe people with dementia are impulsive and unpredictable.

Many celebrities have used their platforms to champion awareness for Alzheimer's disease including actor Samuel L. Jackson, and editor-in-chief of ELLE Magazine Nina Garcia. The former First Lady of California Maria Shriver is also an Alzheimer's champion. Additional dementia awareness has been raised through the diagnoses of high-profile persons, including actors Bruce Willis, diagnosed with frontotemporal dementia; Robin Williams, diagnosed with dementia with Lewy bodies; actress Rita Hayworth; activist Rosa Parks; former US President Ronald Reagan, diagnosed with Alzheimer's disease; TV host Wendy Williams, diagnosed with frontotemporal dementia; and musicians Tony Bennett and Maureen McGovern, both diagnosed with Alzheimer's.

=== Philanthropy ===
In 2015, Atlantic Philanthropies announced a $177 million gift aimed at understanding and reducing dementia. The recipient was the Global Brain Health Institute, a program co-led by the University of California, San Francisco and Trinity College Dublin.

In October 2020, the Caretaker's (James Leyland Kirby) last music release, Everywhere at the End of Time, was popularized by TikTok users for its depiction of the stages of dementia. Kirby said that the use of the recordings could cause empathy among a younger public.

On November 2, 2020, Scottish billionaire Tom Hunter donated £1 million, split between Alzheimer's society, and Music for dementia. This donation was prompted after watching a former music teacher with dementia, Paul Harvey, playing one of his own compositions on the piano in a video.

== Research directions ==
Efforts to facilitate research into people living with dementia include the development of the Dementia Enquirers Gold Standards for Co-Research, and for Ethical Research. Evidence-informed guidelines to involve people with impaired mental capacity nearing the end of life have also been published. And there are dedicated networks such as the UK-based EMPOWER Dementia Network+, which uses a co-productive approach to engage and include people from under-represented communities to tackle inequalities in dementia care and research.

A 2026 Dementia Care and Caregiving Research Summit, hosted by the National Institute of Aging will review progress made in research, identify unmet research needs, and highlight research that is promising, and innovative.

Artificial intelligence, and machine learning algorithms have the potential to improve early diagnosis and treatment planning for dementia.

Kynurenine is a metabolite of tryptophan that regulates microbiome signaling, immune cell response, and neuronal excitation. A disruption in the kynurenine pathway may be associated with the neuropsychiatric symptoms and cognitive prognosis in mild AD dementia; lower numbers of kynurenines are found in those with Alzheimer's. But more research is called for.
