= Integrated cognitive assessment =

Cognitive test screening for dementia

- Purpose: screening for dementia

An integrated cognitive assessment known as CognICA is a five-minute cognitive test that uses an application deliverable to an iPad. CognICA was developed by Cognetivity Neurosciences and in 2021 was given FDA approval for its commercial use as a medical device. CognICA had earlier been approved for use in the UK.

CognICA is highly sensitive to the early stages of dementia.
