= Cerebral atrophy =

Medical condition

Cerebral atrophy is a common feature of many of the diseases that affect the brain. Atrophy of any tissue means a decrement in the size of the cell, which can be due to progressive loss of cytoplasmic proteins. In brain tissue, atrophy describes a loss of neurons and the connections between them. Brain atrophy can be classified into two main categories: generalized and focal atrophy. Generalized atrophy occurs across the entire brain whereas focal atrophy affects cells in a specific location. If the cerebral hemispheres (the two lobes of the brain that form the cerebrum) are affected, conscious thought and voluntary processes may be impaired.

Some degree of cerebral shrinkage occurs naturally with the dynamic process of aging. Structural changes continue during adulthood as brain shrinkage commences after the age of 35, at a rate of 0.2% per year. The rate of decline is accelerated when individuals reach 70 years old. By the age of 90, the human brain will have experienced a 15% loss of its initial peak weight. Besides brain atrophy, aging has also been associated with cerebral microbleeds.

== Causes ==
Cerebral atrophy is not a disease, but rather a sign of one or more disease or biological processes. Many diseases that cause cerebral atrophy are associated with dementia, seizures, and a group of language disorders called the aphasias. Dementia is characterized by a progressive impairment of memory and intellectual function that is severe enough to interfere with social and work skills. Memory, orientation, abstraction, ability to learn, visual-spatial perception, and higher executive functions such as planning, organizing and sequencing may also be impaired. Seizures can take different forms, appearing as disorientation, strange repetitive movements, loss of consciousness, or convulsions. Aphasias are a group of disorders characterized by disturbances in speaking and understanding language. Receptive aphasia causes impaired comprehension. Expressive aphasia is reflected in odd choices of words, the use of partial phrases, disjointed clauses, and incomplete sentences. The pattern and rate of progression of cerebral atrophy depends on the disease involved.

=== Injury ===
- Stroke, loss of brain function due to a sudden interruption of blood supply in the brain
- Moderate-to-severe traumatic brain injury

=== Diseases and disorders ===
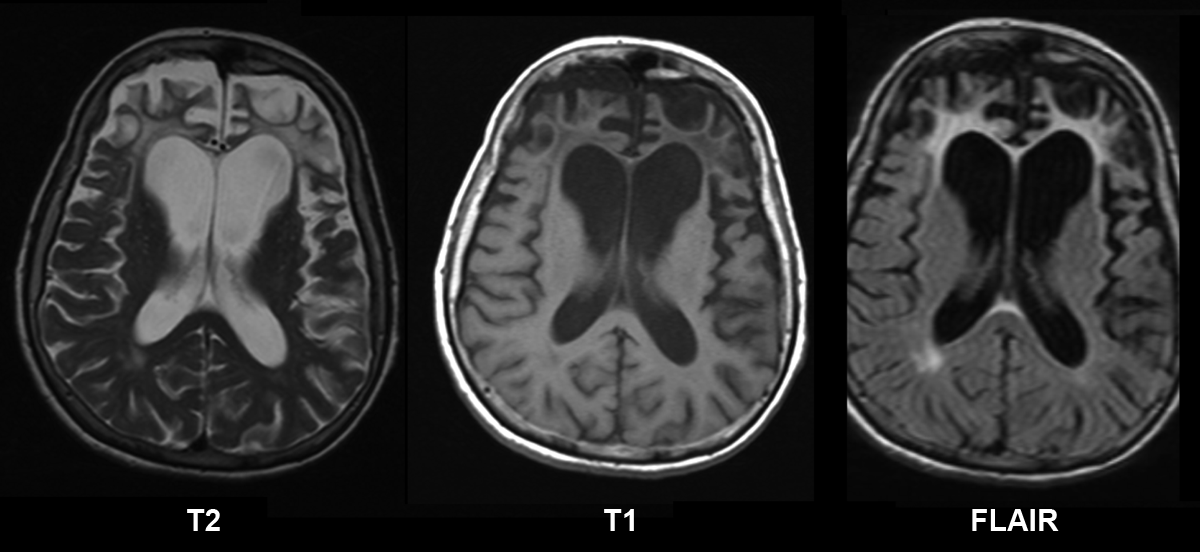
Pick's disease showing brain atrophy,

- Alzheimer's disease; high resolution MRI scans have shown the progression of cerebral atrophy in Alzheimer's disease
- Cerebral palsy, in which lesions (damaged areas) may impair motor coordination
- Senile dementia, fronto-temporal dementia, and vascular dementia
- Pick's disease, causes progressive destruction of nerve cells in the brain
- Huntington's disease, and other genetic disorders that cause build-up of toxic levels of proteins in neurons
- Leukodystrophies, such as Krabbe disease, which destroy the myelin sheath that protects axons
- Multiple sclerosis, which causes inflammation, myelin damage, and lesions in cerebral tissue
- Epilepsy, in which lesions cause abnormal electrochemical discharges that result in seizures
- GLUT1 deficiency syndrome
- Anorexia nervosa, bulimia nervosa, and other eating disorders
- Malnutrition, caused by lack or excess of nutrition from foods
- Type II diabetes, where the body does not use insulin properly resulting in high blood sugar
- Bipolar disorder, significant loss of brain tissue during manic episodes; however it's not verified whether the episodes cause brain tissue loss or vice versa
- Schizophrenia is associated with brain tissue volume loss.
- Mitochondrial encephalomyopathies, such as Kearns–Sayre syndrome, which interfere with the basic functions of neurons
- Posterior cortical atrophy: in the most posterior area of the brain lies the visual cortex, the area of the brain where visual information is received and processed. When cortical atrophy occurs in this brain area due to neurodegeneration, the first symptom is impairment in vision. A common vision impairment seen in patients with posterior cortical atrophy is simultanagnosia, where a person is unable to see multiple locations at once or to quickly shift attention between these locations. When looking at images of a brain with posterior cortical atrophy, one can see a loss in volume of the dorsal and ventral visual pathways, where visual stimuli is brought to the visual cortex and integrated information is sent back out to other areas of the brain. Because this disorder results in visual impairments, there is often a missed or delayed diagnosis, as the assumption is that there is a problem is in the eyes when the reality is that the problem is all the way in the back of the brain.
- Prion diseases, a group of invariably fatal encephalopathies that cause the progressive death of neurons.

=== Infections ===
An infectious agent or the inflammatory reaction to it can destroy neurons and their axons. These include:

- Encephalitis, acute inflammation in the brain
- Neurosyphilis, an infection in the brain or spinal cord
- AIDS, disease of the immune system

=== Drug-induced ===
- Alcohol (partially reversible): Standardized MRI evidence suggest chronic alcoholism (alcohol use disorder) is associated with widespread cortical atrophy and major brain changes. In contrast to healthy controls, macrostructural findings indicate alcoholic brains are smaller in mass and volume. Neuroimaging studies also show that cortical shrinkage in "uncomplicated alcoholism" is most severe in the frontal lobe in comparison to the other divisions of the cerebral cortex. In addition, neurological diseases that co-occur with excessive alcohol consumption—such as Wernicke–Korsakoff syndrome (WKS)—are characterized by substantial volume deficits of the diencephalon structures. In comparison to unaffected, non-alcoholic participants, tissue degeneration in WKS patients is found in specific white matter structures including the corpus callosum, the hippocampus, the subcortical basal ganglia (hypothalamus, thalamus, putamen), and the mammillary bodies.
- Antipsychotic use. However, untreated psychosis is associated with decreases in brain volume also.
- Corticosteroid use (There appears to be correlations between degree of dosing with corticosteroids and cerebral atrophy)

== Diagnosis ==
=== Neurofilament light chain ===
Cerebrospinal fluid (CSF) is a fluid that is found exclusively in the brain and spinal cord that circulates between sections of the brain offering an extra layer of protection. Studies have shown that biomarkers in the CSF and plasma can be tracked for their presence in different parts of the brain—and their presence can tell us about cerebral atrophy. One study took advantage of biomarkers, namely one called neurofilament light chain (NFL), in patients with Alzheimer's disease. Neurofilament light chain is a protein that is important in the growth and branching of neurons—cells found in the brain. In Alzheimer's Disease, neurons will stop working or die in a process called neurodegeneration. By tracking NFL, researchers can see this neurodegeneration, which this study showed was associated with brain atrophy and later cognitive decline in Alzheimer's patients. Other biomarkers like Ng – a protein important in long-term potentiation and memory – have been tracked for their associations with brain atrophy as well, but NFL had the greatest association.

=== Measures ===
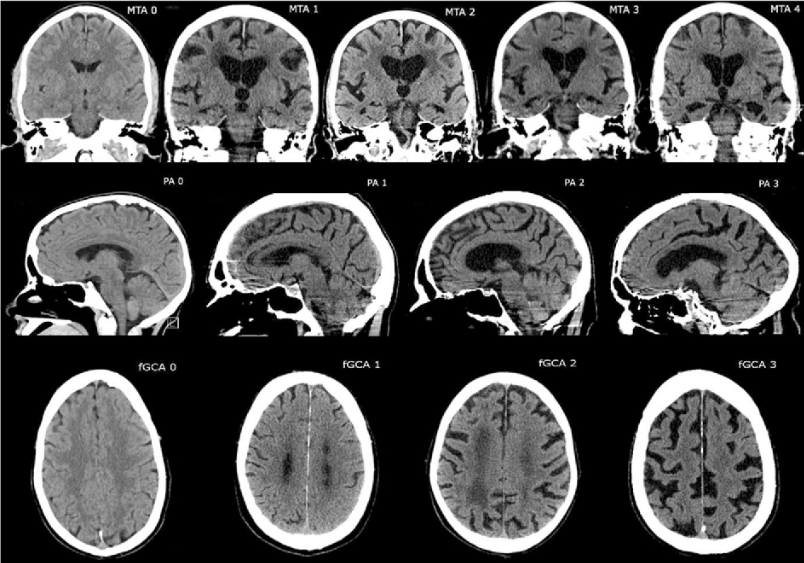
Brain CT with different grading systems of cerebral atrophy (seen as decreased size of gyri and secondary increased size of sulci): Medial temporal lobe atrophy (MTA); Posterior atrophy (PA); Frontal cortical atrophy (fGCA)

CT and MRI are most commonly used to observe the brain for cerebral atrophy. A CT scan takes cross sectional images of the brain using X-rays, while an MRI uses a magnetic field. With both measures, multiple images can be compared to see if there is a loss in brain volume over time.

=== Difference from hydrocephalus ===
Cerebral atrophy can be hard to distinguish from hydrocephalus because both cerebral atrophy and hydrocephalus involve an increase in cerebrospinal fluid (CSF) volume. In cerebral atrophy, this increase in CSF volume comes as a result of the decrease in cortical volume. In hydrocephalus, the increase in volume happens due to the CSF itself.

Typical imaging findings in normal pressure hydrocephalus versus brain atrophy.
	Normal pressure hydrocephalus	Brain atrophy
Preferable projection	Coronal plane at the level of the posterior commissure of the brain.	
Modality in this example	CT	MRI
CSF spaces over the convexity near the vertex (red ellipse)	Narrowed convexity ("tight convexity") as well as medial cisterns	Widened vertex (red arrow) and medial cisterns (green arrow)
Callosal angle (blue V)	Acute angle	Obtuse angle
Most likely cause of leucoaraiosis (periventricular signal alterations, blue arrows)	Transependymal cerebrospinal fluid diapedesis	Vascular encephalopathy, in this case suggested by unilateral occurrence

== Treatment ==
Prevention of cerebral atrophy depends on preventing the conditions driving it. Some steps that can be taken to reduce the risk:

- controlling blood pressure
- a healthy balanced diet including omega-3's and antioxidants
- staying active mentally, physically, and socially.

=== Reversibility of cerebral atrophy ===
While most cerebral atrophy is said to be irreversible, there are recent studies that show this is not always the case. A child who was treated with ACTH originally showed atrophy, but four months after treatment the brain was seemingly normal again.

As previously mentioned, chronic alcoholism is known to be associated with significant brain damage. The pronounced shrinkage in the frontal lobes and cerebellum of alcoholics correlates with serious impairments in executive and psychomotor functions. However, longitudinal studies suggest that some of these brain damages are partially reversible with abstinence. In response to drinking cessation, bodies of gray and white matter including the cerebral cortex, the limbic system (amygdala, hippocampus, thalamus), the cerebellum, and the brainstem all showed a general increase in brain volume. Similarly, ventricular enlargement—which reflects atrophy of surrounding brain regions—is also reduced in abstinent alcoholics. Following extended sobriety, the volume of the lateral and third ventricles was decreased, and abstainers showed an improvement in working memory and balance. Finally, evidence for the recovery of brain volume with continued sobriety is supported by the improvement in neuropsychological performance. Compared to the control participants, abstinent alcoholic patients scored significantly better on tests measuring cognitive, sensory, and motor functions including abstract reasoning, memory, visuospatial ability, and gait and balance. That being said, while short-term abstinence suffices to produce structural and functional recovery, some alcohol-induced brain changes may persist even after long-term sobriety.

== See also ==
- Cerebral atherosclerosis
- Neurodegeneration
- Traumatic brain injury
- Neuroimmunology
- Neuroendocrinology
- Comorbidity
- Migraine
