= Pseudodementia =

- Other names: Depression-related cognitive dysfunction, depressive cognitive disorder, pseudosenility, reversible dementia
- Specialty: Psychiatry
- Symptoms: Sadness, anxiety, somatic symptoms
- Causes: Depression, schizophrenia, psychosis, and other psychiatric conditions that can impair cognitive functions
- Risk factors: Depression, mania
- Treatment: Treatment of the causative factor such as antidepressants

Pseudodementia (otherwise known as depression-related cognitive dysfunction or depressive cognitive disorder) is a condition that leads to cognitive and functional impairment imitating dementia that is secondary to psychiatric disorders, especially clinical depression. Pseudodementia can develop in a wide range of neuropsychiatric disease such as depression, schizophrenia and other psychoses, mania, dissociative disorders, and conversion disorders. The presentations of pseudodementia may mimic organic dementia, but are essentially reversible on treatment and doesn't lead to actual brain degeneration. However, it has been found that some of the cognitive symptoms associated with pseudodementia can persist as residual symptoms and even transform into true neurodegenerative dementia in some cases.

Psychiatric conditions, mainly depression, are the strongest risk factor of pseudodementia rather than age. Even though most of the existing studies focused on older age groups, younger adults can develop pseudodementia if they have depression. While aging does affect the cognition and brain function and making it hard to distinguish depressive cognitive disorder from actual dementia, there are differential diagnostic screenings available. It is crucial to confirm the correct diagnosis since depressive cognitive disorder is reversible with proper treatments.

Pseudodementia typically involves three cognitive components: memory issues, deficits in executive functioning, and deficits in speech and language. Specific cognitive symptoms might include trouble recalling words or remembering things in general, decreased attentional control and concentration, difficulty completing tasks or making decisions, decreased speed and fluency of speech, and impaired processing speed. Since the symptoms of pseudodementia are highly similar to dementia, it is critical for complete differential diagnosis to completely exclude dementia. People with pseudodementia are typically very distressed about the cognitive impairment they experience. Currently, the treatment of pseudodementia is mainly focused on treating depression, cognitive impairment, and dementia. Treatments with antidepressants such as SSRIs (selective serotonin reuptake inhibitors), SNRIs (serotonin-norepinephrine reuptake inhibitors), TCAs (tricyclic antidepressants), Zolmitriptan, Vortioxetine, and Cholinesterase inhibitors can lead to improvements in cognitive dysfunction. Dopaminergic psychostimulants such as dextroamphetamine, methylphenidate, and to a lesser extent modafinil, may also produce robust improvements in cognition in the short-term. Among the stimulant class, dextroamphetamine produces the greatest improvements in symptoms, but is more neurotoxic at higher-than-therapeutic doses.

== History ==
Carl Wernicke is often believed to have been the source of the term pseudodementia (in his native German, Pseudodemenz). Despite this belief being held by many of his students, Wernicke never actually used the word in any of his written works. It is possible that this misconception comes from Wernicke's discussions on Ganser's syndrome. Instead, the first written instance of pseudodementia was by one of Wernicke's students, Georg Stertz. However the term itself was not linked to the modern understanding of it until 1961 by psychiatrist Leslie Gordon Kiloh, who noticed patients with cognitive symptoms consistent with dementia who improved with treatment. Kiloh believed that the term should be used to describe a person's presentation, rather than an outright diagnosis. Modern research, however, has shown evidence for the term being used in such a way. Reversible causes of true dementia must be excluded. His term was mainly descriptive. The clinical phenomenon, however, has been well-known since the late 19th century as melancholic dementia.

Doubts about the classification and features of the syndrome, and the misleading nature of the name, led to proposals that the term be dropped. However, proponents argue that although it is not a defined singular concept with a precise set of symptoms, it is a practical and useful term that has held up well in clinical practice, and also highlights those who may have a treatable condition.

== Presentation ==
The history of disturbance in pseudodementia is often short and abrupt onset, while dementia is more often insidious. In addition, there is often minor, or an absence of, any abnormal brain patterns seen via imaging which indicate an organic component to the cognitive decline, such as what one would see in dementia. The key symptoms of pseudodementia include: speech impairments, memory deficits, attention problems, emotional control issues, organization difficulties, and difficulties in decision making. Clinically, people with pseudodementia differ from those with true dementia when their memory is tested. They will often answer that they don't know the answer to a question, and their attention and concentration are often intact. By contrast, those presenting with organic dementia will often have "near-miss" answers rather than stating that they do not know the answer. This can make diagnosis difficult and result in misdiagnosis as a patient might have organic dementia but answer questions in a way that suggests pseudodementia, or vice versa. In addition, people presenting with pseudodementia often lack the gradual mental decline seen in true dementia. They instead tend to remain at the same level of reduced cognitive function throughout. However, for some, pseudodementia can eventually progress to organic dementia and lead to lowered cognitive function. Because of this, some recommend that elderly patients that present with pseudodementia should receive a full screening for dementia, as well as closely monitor cognitive faculties in order to catch the progression to organic dementia early. They may appear upset or distressed, and those with true dementia will often give wrong answers, have poor attention and concentration, and appear indifferent or unconcerned. The symptoms of depression oftentimes mimic dementia even though it may be co-occurring.

== Causes ==
Pseudodementia refers to "behavioral changes that resemble those of the progressive degenerative dementias, but which are attributable to so-called functional causes". The main cause of pseudodementia is depression. Any age group can develop pseudodementia. In depression, processing centers in the brain responsible for cognitive function and memory are affected, including the prefrontal cortex, amygdala, and hippocampus. Reduced function of the hippocampus results in impaired recognition and recall of memories, a symptom commonly associated with dementia. While not as common, other mental health disorders and comorbidities can also cause symptoms that mimic dementia, and thus must be considered when making a diagnosis.

== Diagnosis ==
=== Differential diagnosis ===
While there is currently no cure for dementia, other psychiatric disorders that may result in dementia-like symptoms are able to be treated. Thus, it is essential to complete differential diagnosis, where other possibilities are appropriately ruled out to avoid misdiagnosis and inappropriate treatment plans.

The implementation and application of existing collaborative care models, such as DICE (describe, investigate, create, evaluate), can aid in avoiding misdiagnosis. DICE is a method utilized by healthcare workers to evaluate and manage behavioral and psychological symptoms associated with dementia. Comorbidities (such as vascular, infectious, traumatic, autoimmune, idiopathic, or even becoming malnourished) have the potential to mimic symptoms of dementia and thus must be evaluated for, typically through taking a complete patient history and physical exam. For instance, studies have also shown a relationship between depression and its cognitive effects on everyday functioning and distortions of memory.

Since pseudodementia does not cause deterioration of the brain, brain scans can be used to visualize potential deterioration associated with dementia. Investigations such as PET and SPECT imaging of the brain show reduced blood flow in areas of the brain in people with Alzheimer's disease (AD), the most common type of dementia, compared with a more normal blood flow in those with pseudodementia. Reduced blood flow leads to an inadequate oxygen supply that reaches the brain, causing irreversible cell damage and cell death. In addition, MRI results show medial temporal lobe atrophy, which causes impaired recall of facts and events (declarative memory), in individuals with AD.

=== Pseudodementia vs. dementia ===
Pseudodementia symptoms can appear similar to dementia. Due to the similar signs and symptoms, it can result in a misdiagnosis of depression, as well as adverse effects from inaccurately prescribed medications. Generally, dementia involves a steady and irreversible cognitive decline while pseudodementia-induced symptoms are reversible. Thus, once the depression is properly treated or the medication therapy has been modified, depression-induced cognitive impairment can be effectively reversed. Commonly within older adults, diminished mental capacity and social withdrawal are identified as dementia symptoms without considering and ruling out depression. As a result, older adult patients are often misdiagnosed due to insufficient testing.

Cognitive symptoms such as memory loss, slowed movement, or reduced/ slowed speech, are sometimes initially misdiagnosed as dementia, however, further investigation determined that these patients were suffering from a major depressive episode. This is an important distinction as the former is untreatable, whereas the latter is treatable using antidepressant therapy, electroconvulsive therapy, or both. In contrast to major depression, dementia is a progressive neurodegenerative syndrome involving a pervasive impairment of higher cortical functions resulting from widespread brain pathology.

The European Association of Nuclear Medicine recommends that FDG-PET be used to differentiate between pseudodementia and dementias like Alzheimer's disease, as specific hypometabolism patterns are usually apparent the latter, while normal or frontal hypometabolism are more typical of the former. A paucity of evidence related to the specific features of pseudodementia limits the diagnostic utility of FDG-PET. The recommendation that FDG-PET be used in cases of suspected pseudodementia is based on the high negative predictive value of a normal FDG-PET scan, which "virtually excludes" the possibility of neurodegenerative dementia.

A significant overlap in cognitive and neuropsychological dysfunction in dementia and pseudodementia patients increases the difficulty in diagnosis. Differences in the severity of impairment and quality of patients' responses can be observed, and a test of antisaccadic movements may be used to differentiate the two, as pseudodementia patients have poorer performance on this test. Other researchers have suggested additional criteria to differentiate pseudodementia from dementia, based on their studies. However, the sample size for these studies are relatively small so the validity of the studies are limited. A systematic review conducted in 2018 reviewed 18 longitudinal studies about pseudodementia. Among the 284 patients that were studied, 33% of the patients developed irreversible dementia while 53% of the patients no longer met the criteria for dementia during follow-up. Individuals with pseudodementia present considerable cognitive deficits, including disorders in learning, memory and psychomotor performance. Substantial evidences from brain imaging such as CT scanning and positron emission tomography (PET) have also revealed abnormalities in brain structure and function.

A comparison between dementia and pseudodementia is shown below.

Variable	Pseudodementia	Dementia
Onset	More precise, usually in terms of days or weeks	Subtle
Course	Rapid, uneven	Slow, worse at night
Past history	Depression or mania frequently	Uncertain relation
Family history	Depression or mania	Positive family history for dementia in approximately 50% DAT
Mood	Depressed; little or no response to sad or funny situations; behavior and affect inconsistent with degree of cognitive deficit	Shallow or labile; normal or exaggerated response to sad or funny situations; consistent with degree of cognitive impairment
Cooperation	Poor; little effort to perform well; responds often with "I don't know"; apathetic, emphasizes failure	Good; frustrated by inability to do well; response to queries approximate con fabricated or perseverated; emphasizes trivial accomplishment
Memory	Highlight memory loss; greater impairment of personality features (e.g. confidence, drive, interests, and attention)	Denies or minimizes impairments; greater impairment in cognitive features (recent memory and orientation to time and date)
Mini-Mental State Exam (MMSE).	Changeable on repeated tests	Stable on repeated tests
Symptoms	Increased psychologic symptoms: sadness, anxiety, somatic symptoms	Increased neurologic symptoms: dysphasia, dyspraxia, agnosia, incontinence
Computed Tomography (CT) and Electroencephalogram (EEG)	Normal for age	Abnormal

== Management ==
=== Pharmacological ===
If effective medical treatment for depression is given, this can aid in the distinction between pseudodementia and dementia. Antidepressants have been found to assist in the elimination of cognitive dysfunction associated with depression, whereas cognitive dysfunction associated with true dementia continues along a steady gradient. In cases where antidepressant therapy is not well tolerated, patients can consider electroconvulsive therapy as a possible alternative. However, studies have revealed that patients who displayed cognitive dysfunction related to depression eventually developed dementia later on in their lives.

The development of treatments for dementia has not been as fast as those for depression. Hence, the pharmacological treatments for pseudodementia do not directly treat the condition itself but directly treat dementia, depression, and cognitive impairment. These medications include SSRI (Selective Serotonin Reuptake Inhibitor), SNRI (Serotonin-norepinephrine Reuptake Inhibitors), TCAs (Tricyclic antidepressants), Zolmitriptan, and cholinesterase inhibitors.

- SSRI or Selective Serotonin Reuptake Inhibitors belong to the class of antidepressants. Some examples of SSRIs are fluoxetine (Prozac), paroxetine (Paxil), sertraline (Zoloft), citalopram (Celexa), and escitalopram (Lexapro). SSRIs function by inhibiting serotonin reabsorption into neurons, allowing more serotonin to be accessible and improving nerve cell communication. Therefore, SSRIs are considered the first-line agent for pseudodementia due to the rise in serotonin levels, which may assist in alleviating pseudodementia-related depressive symptoms.
- SNRI or Serotonin-norepinephrine Reuptake Inhibitors also belong to the class of antidepressants. Some examples of SNRIs are desvenlafaxine (Pristiq), duloxetine (Cymbalta), levomilnacipran (Fetzima), and milnacipran (Savella). In addition to inhibiting serotonin reabsorption, SNRIs also inhibit norepinephrine reabsorption into neurons, allowing more serotonin and norepinephrine to be accessible to nerve cells, improving both nerve cell communication and energy levels. However, SNRIs are considered the second-line agent for pseudodementia due to more severe side effects compared to SSRIs, such as dry mouth and hypertension.
- TCAs or Tricyclic Antidepressants are another medications that belong to the class of antidepressants. Some examples of TCA are amitriptyline (Elavil), clomipramine (Anafranil), doxepin (Sinequan), and imipramine (Tofranil). TCAs also function like SNRIs by inhibiting both serotonin and norepinephrine reabsorption into neurons. However, TCAs activate more neurotransmitters or chemical messengers than SNRIs, perhaps causing additional adverse effects. Therefore, TCAs are not recommended for use unless other antidepressants are no longer working.
- Zolmitriptan (Zomig) belongs to the class of selective serotonin receptor agonists. The mechanism of action of zolmitriptan is to block pain signals by constricting blood vessels in the brain that cause migraines. In addition to affecting blood vessel constriction, Zolmitriptan indirectly eases depression associated with pseudodementia since it is a selective serotonin receptor agonist.
- Cholinesterase Inhibitors belong to the class of drugs that inhibit the breakdown of a neurotransmitter called Acetycholine that helps improve nerve cell communication. Some examples of cholinesterase inhibitors are donepezil (Acricept), rivastigmine (Exelon), and galantamine (Razadyne). All of these cholinesterase inhibitors are FDA-approved to treat all or certain stages of Alzheimer's disease. Since the main cause of pseudodementia is found to be depression, Selective Serotonin Reuptake Inhibitors (SSRIs) are still preferred over other medications.

=== Non-pharmacological ===
When pharmacological treatments are ineffective, or in addition to pharmacological treatments, there are a number of non-pharmacological therapies that can be used in the treatment of depression. For some patients, cognitive behavior therapy (This is an effective form of therapy for a wide range of mental illnesses including depression, anxiety disorders, drug abuse problems, etc. that is based on the belief that psychological problems are rooted, in part, in one's own behavior and thought patterns. As such, by changing these patterns using new strategies learned in cognitive behavioral therapy, a patient can learn to better cope.) or interpersonal therapy (This is a form of therapy that has been used in an integrated manner to treat a wide range of psychiatric disorders. It is based on the belief that a patient's relationships in the past and/or present is directly linked to their mental challenges and by improving those relationships, a patient's mental health can be improved.) can be used to delve deeper into their symptoms, ways to manage them, and the root causes of a patient's depression. Patients can chose to participate in these therapies in individual sessions or in a group setting.

== Future research ==
Given the limitations and amount of current researches and studies about pseudodementia, there are still many questions left to answer. Future research regarding younger age groups is necessary to better characterize the risk factors, further criteria, and correlation of age and development of pseudodementia. Future study should also incorporate more modern technologies such as genetic sequencing, investigation of possible pseudodementia-related biomarkers, and PET scans to better understand the underlying mechanism of pseudodementia. In addition, future studies should incorporate larger sample size to increase the validity of the study results and any groups with higher risk of developing pseudodementia to extend the scope of the study.
