= Cognitive intervention =

Form of psychological intervention

A cognitive intervention is a form of psychological intervention, a technique and therapy practised in counselling. It describes a myriad of approaches to therapy that focus on addressing psychological distress at a cognitive level. It is also associated with cognitive therapy, which focuses on the thought process and the manner by which emotions have bearing on the cognitive processes and structures. The cognitive intervention forces behavioural change. Counsellors adopt different technique level to suit the characteristic of the client. For instance, when counselling adolescents, a more advanced strategy is adopted than the intervention used in children. Before the intervention, an initial cognitive assessment is also conducted to cover the concerns of the cognitive approach, which cover the whole range of human expression - thought, feeling, behaviour, and environmental triggers.

The various types of cognitive interventions are practiced in cognitive psychology.

== Description ==
Cognitive intervention focuses on addressing and changing beliefs and attitudes as well as improving cognition. Notably, a common domain of interventions is the inspection of past experiences that led to formations of certain beliefs and attitudes. Retrospection is most often used to change how past events/experiences are perceived by the individual. The purpose of addressing past experiences is to address the root of the psychological distress and, by doing so, redirect thoughts and relieve distress. Another common domain is mental stimulation to avoid the decay of neural pathways. This generally focuses on creating new neural pathways and/or stimulating existing pathways. Cognitive interventions assume that thought processes can, to some extent, be controlled and changed by the individual. Generally, all cognitive interventions focus on exercising the mind to think differently.

=== Background ===
One of the earliest uses of cognitive interventions was by Aaron T. Beck and colleagues. Beck's "cognitive theory of depression" focused on addressing beliefs that a person holds that makes them being more susceptible to depression. Part of Beck's cognitive theory focused on the cognitive triad to model belief systems. These beliefs can be about themselves, others, or the world around them. For instance, one harmful belief is never being good enough which can lead to self-deprecation and lead to increased vulnerability to depression. Beck developed cognitive therapies to address and change these beliefs in order to help manage depression. Cognitive therapy consists of a series of sessions that aim to provide depressed patients with "cognitive and behavioural skills" to cope with depression.

Beck's cognitive therapy was further developed for clinical uses to address a broad spectrum of mental illnesses. Beck's cognitive theory of depression was extended to address general anxiety disorder, personality disorders and more. Cognitive therapies developed to address mental disorders focused on changing maladaptive beliefs that modify people's perception of self and well as experience of their environment.

Modern use of cognitive interventions has extended beyond addressing beliefs to treating a broad range of psychological problems at a cognitive level.

== Applications ==
Cognitive interventions are applied in both clinical and non-clinical settings. The cognitive intervention strategy differs depending on the application but follows the same general framework. The strategies used depend on the target of the intervention.

Cognitive behavioural therapy

Cognitive behavioral therapy (CBT) is a renowned form of non-pharmacological psychotherapy developed by Beck in the 1960s. Initially derived from Beck's Cognitive Triad, CBT was designed to address a range of mental health conditions, including depression, anxiety disorders and other severe mental health issues.

CBT is grounded in the systematic training of individuals to question their automatic thoughts daily. With repetition, this practice can aid individuals to modify their underlying cognitive schemas. The principal objective of CBT is to alter dysfunctional thinking patterns by encouraging individuals to be their own therapist, as cognitive psychologists believe that psychological disorders arise, in part, from faulty or unhelpful modes of thinking and learned patterns of maladaptive behaviour. By actively challenging negative cognitions and patterns of behaviour, individuals experiencing psychological distress can develop healthier and adaptive beliefs to improve overall functioning and quality of life.

CBT therapists instruct clients to identify recurring cognitive distortions and to reevaluate them by examining the evidence behind negative thoughts and reinforce more balanced interpretations. An individual exhibiting catastrophic thinking – for instance, "I always fail at everything" – is encouraged to acknowledge the inaccuracy of this belief and guided towards practicing compassionate self-dialogue. Techniques such as role-playing are also employed to enable clients to interpret social cues more realistically, to alleviate anxiety and correct cognitive biases within a safe and controlled environment.

A cornerstone of CBT for social anxiety involves guiding clients to reinterpret interpersonal situations in a more balanced manner, thereby reducing social apprehension. A meta-analysis of 20 randomised controlled trials concluded that cognitive therapy is highly effective in treating social phobia and suggested that exposure therapy techniques may yield comparable benefits for other anxiety disorders by diminishing avoidance behaviours. Exposure therapy incrementally confronts the individual with feared stimuli or contexts, allowing them to learn – through repeated, safe encounters, that the anticipated harm never materialises. Over time, the patient becomes habituated to that object/situation. This process allows clients to resume and reclaim activities and aspects of life that they had been avoiding, which is a key goal of CBT.

Empirical research further indicates that, through repeated practice, patients improve at cognitive restructuring. This weakens the influence of maladaptive thoughts over mood and behaviour. Improved proficiency in this skill is a strong predictor of symptom reduction across various anxiety disorders.

CBT will not employ all strategies simultaneously. Instead, therapists and clients collaborate to establish personalised treatment goals and to select strategies best suited to the nature of the presenting problem. CBT differs from other forms of psychological treatment as therapists set "homework" assignments designed to reinforce therapeutic gains between sessions; this promotes the habitual modification of unhelpful cognitions and behaviours. The approach emphasises the client's current functioning and focuses on developing practical, forward-looking strategies without extensively exploring the origins of psychological difficulties.

Individuals with depression or anxiety frequently exhibit excessive and harsh self-criticism and poor self-efficacy. Treatment outcome studies have shown that high levels of self-critical thinking predict poorer therapeutic response and inhibits the development of a strong therapeutic alliance. CBT addresses these issues as clients are taught to monitor and challenge their "inner critic" through structured practice. As patients improve at successfully managing negative self-evaluations and stressors, their sense of personal agency increases, thereby improving self-efficacy for future challenges.

=== Dementia ===
Cognitive interventions are a non-pharmacological/psychological method of approaching dementia as well as mild cognitive impairment. The three approaches to cognitive interventions for dementia were developed in 2003 by Clare and colleagues. The three approaches were created for the purpose of using cognitive interventions to address Alzheimer's disease (AD), and it has been widely used to address AD and different forms of dementia. They defined a conceptual framework that categorised three approaches to cognitive interventions. The three approaches have different purposes and underlying assumptions.

Cognitive stimulation
Cognitive stimulation aims to enhance "cognitive and social functioning". Its main goal is global cognitive stimulation. It assumes that cognitive functions operate simultaneously and therefore cognitive interventions should employ a global method of cognitive stimulation. Cognitive stimulation involves activities to improve cognition in social settings, such as discussions.
Cognitive training
Cognitive training is done through "guided practice on a set of standard tasks". These standard tasks are aimed to challenge and improve specific cognitive functions (such as memory). In essence, it uses the repetition of standardised tasks to train the mind to perform certain cognitive functions. It assumes that, through "routine practice" of specific functions, these functions can be improved or at least maintained. Cognitive training can happen in many forms depending on the circumstances of the individual and can vary in difficulty; it can be administered by a therapist, done in a social setting, guided by a caregiver etc. In brief, it focuses on improving specific cognitive functions through repeated practice of standardised tasks.
Cognitive rehabilitation
The aim of cognitive rehabilitation is to help people "achieve or maintain an optimal level of physical, psychological and social functioning" given their specific conditions. Cognitive rehabilitation recognises that cognitive impairment causes reverberating consequences of all aspects of people's life and aims to minimise the consequences felt. By rehabilitating people to social, physical, and psychological contexts, cognitive rehabilitation aims to help people resume a constructive lifestyle to the best of their ability. Cognitive rehabilitation is individualised to the needs of each individual and changes as the individual's condition evolves.

=== Memory Performance and Memory Self-Efficacy ===
There is a general pattern of cognitive decline as people age, and one notable aspect of decline is memory. Specifically, memory performance declines in the older adult population as well as their memory self-efficacy. In other words, older adults have decreasing memory functions as well as a loss of confidence in their abilities to "use memory effectively". However, due to adult neurogenesis, people are capable of enhancing their cognitive abilities throughout their life. Thus numerous cognitive interventions models were developed to improve memory performance and increase memory self-efficacy. These models have been tested for their significance in improving cognitive functioning. Some notable models are:

Adult Development and Enrichment Project (ADEPT)
the ADEPT model improves cognitive capabilities through "fluid ability training". Fluid intelligence generally declines as people age, through training, ADEPT aims to slow the decline and improve cognitive ability. By improving fluid cognitive abilities, ADEPT can potentially improve memory functioning.
Advanced Cognitive Training for Independent and Vital Elderly (ACTIVE)
ACTIVE uses cognitive training to intellectually stimulate older adults. It aims to protect cognitive functioning of older adults, including memory performance, in the ageing process. To test its effectiveness, the largest randomized clinical trial to test cognitive training was done in the US. The results from the trial found that ACTIVE has a significant effect on improving "targeted cognitive abilities".

=== Mild Cognitive Impairment ===
==== Cognition-based interventions for healthy older people and people with mild cognitive impairment ====
Cognitive intervention programmes have gained attention, considering the lack of effective pharmacological treatments for mild cognitive impairment (MCI), particularly for long-term benefits. The interventions focus on delaying further cognitive decline for individuals with MCI, a population at higher risk of progressing to AD. Unlike those with advanced dementia, those with MCI still retain significant cognitive abilities, making them ideal candidates for such interventions.

Current evidence suggests that cognition-based interventions do improve mental performance (i.e. memory, executive function, attention, and speed) in older adults and people with mild cognitive impairment. Especially, immediate and delayed verbal recall resulted in higher performance gains from memory training.

A meta-analysis of 17 clinical studies demonstrated that cognitive training resulted in significant improvements in both overall cognitive function and self-rated performance among MCI patients. Cognitive interventions were particularly effective in areas including language, self-rated anxiety and functional ability. Across research, cognitive training tends to be most impactful for healthy older adults, particularly when sessions are shorter, more frequent and involve smaller group sizes. Improvements were most notable in areas such as processing speed, and the benefits were enhanced when non-memory components such as visual imagery and stress reduction were incorporated.

Long-term benefits of cognitive training were observed, with improvements in cognitive performance equivalent to a 7–14-year reduction in age-related cognitive decline, and improvements to overall well-being. These results suggest that early cognitive training can help persons with MCI improve performance on cognitive and functional measures, with these benefits potentially persisting in the long-term.

== Criticism ==
The use of cognitive interventions to address mental disorders is controversial and have had mixed results. Cognitive intervention programs have shown to be ineffective to treat certain conditions and therefore puts in the question the scope of applications for cognitive interventions.

CBT
Some scholars argue that CBT may focus too heavily on cognitive restructuring without sufficiently engaging with the underlying emotional processes that contribute to self-critical tendencies. Self-criticism is often deeply rooted in emotional experiences such as feelings of inadequacy and shame, typically stemming from childhood attachment relationships and family dynamics. As such, CBT alone may be limited in the depth of therapeutic change it can bring about for individuals whose self-criticism stems from these underlying emotional experiences. Research suggests that an integrated approach that combines cognitive techniques with emotion-focused strategies, could be more effective for lasting change in self-critical clients. Another criticism of CBT is the sole focus on correcting cognitive distortions; this overlooks any underlying cognitive deficiencies. For individuals with cognitive deficits, CBT may fail to teach how to develop and apply new cognitive processes, particularly within children.
Progression to Alzheimer's Disease
A literature review done of the use of cognitive intervention programs to "slow progression to AD in healthy elderly" concluded that cognitive interventions are ineffective as a preventative measure for AD.
Early stages of AD and vascular dementia
Cognitive training and cognitive dementia are cognitive intervention programmes used to address memory difficulties of these cognitive impairments; however, Clare and colleagues examined six studies that used cognitive intervention and found no statistically significant effect of these interventions on memory functioning.
Mild cognitive impairment
Cognitive interventions for MCI face several methodological challenges, including the need for larger sample sizes, more randomised controlled trials, and greater diversity in intervention designs. Particularly, the heterogeneity of MCI – where only a subset of individuals progress to advanced dementia - complicates the prediction of outcomes and impedes clear isolation of intervention effects. This introduces endogeneity concerns. To assess whether cognitive interventions can delay the transition from MCI to AD, further long-term studies are necessary to determine the sustainability of such approaches and to evaluate their combined impact when paired with pharmacological treatments on clinical outcomes.

== See also ==
- Brain training
