= Reminiscence therapy =

Intervention technique with brain-injured patients

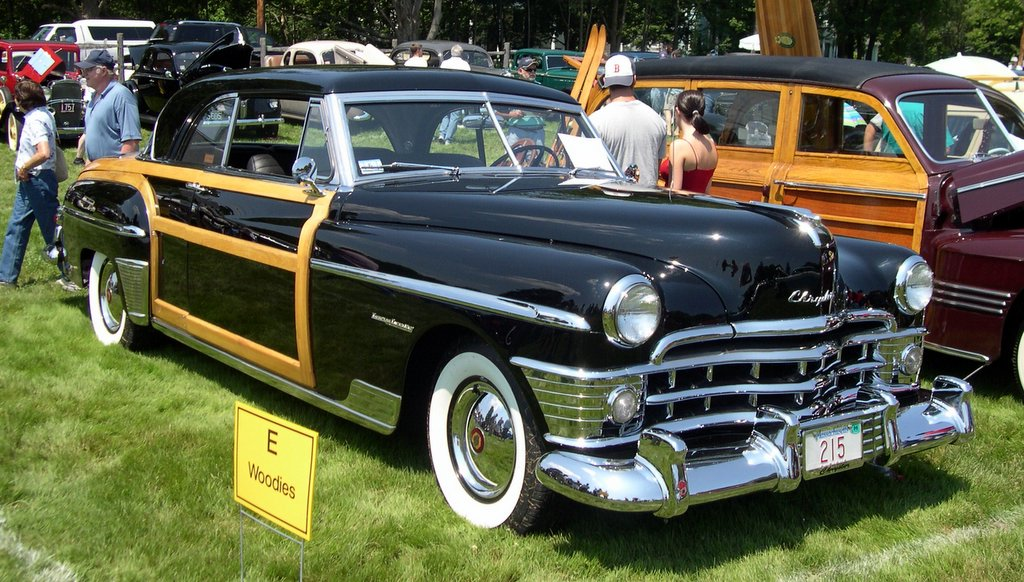
1950 Chrysler Newport Coupe woodie, a car of the type found in the Glenner Town Square "re-created 1950s town" meant to help project participants "rediscover their comfort zone."

Reminiscence therapy is an intervention technique used with people who have a memory disorder, by asking about their life history. For example, if an older person sees an old photo or a vintage car, then they may be asked if they remember when the photo was taken, or if they knew anyone who had a car like that. The technique is used to counsel and support people with brain-injured patients and people with Alzheimer's and similar cognitive problems.

The American Psychological Association (APA) defines "the use of life histories – written, oral, or both – to improve psychological well-being. The therapy is often used with older people." This form of therapeutic intervention respects the life and experiences of the individual with the aim to help the patient maintain good mental health.

The majority of research on reminiscence therapy has been done with the elderly community, especially those suffering from depression, although a few studies have looked at other elderly samples. Research and implementation has been tried in several areas with diverse cultures such as Japan, United Kingdom, USA.

Overall, reminiscence therapy is an inexpensive and potentially beneficial approach to helping the elderly age successfully and happily. It appears to provide them with a sense of overall life satisfaction and coping skills, and may also help to ameliorate the symptoms of depression and dementia.

== Reminiscence ==
Reminiscence has been described as "the volitional or non-volitional act or process of recollecting memories of oneself in the past". In other words, it involves the recalling and re-experiencing of one's life events. This involves having an intact autobiographical memory in order to be able to recall certain life events.The meaningfulness of the reminiscence process depends on how meaningful the memories being recalled are. Different ways to make these memories more meaningful are to ask questions which suggest the importance of the event as well as using historical materials from ones past.

Reminiscence serves different psychological functions, including the taxonomy presented by Webster. Webster's Reminiscence Functions Scale (RFS) includes eight reasons why people reminisce: boredom reduction, bitterness revival, prepare for death, conversation, identity, intimacy maintenance, problem solving, and teach/inform. Psychologists have looked at using reminiscence therapeutically to improve affect and coping skills, although the effectiveness of this therapy has been debated. From more recent data, as outlined below, the therapy appears to have positive and even lasting results within the elderly community.

There are different types of reminiscence which can take place. The two main subtypes are intrapersonal and interpersonal reminiscence. Intrapersonal takes a cognitive stance and occurs individually. Interpersonal takes more of a conversational side and is a group-based therapy. Reminiscence can then be further broken down into three specific types which are: information, evaluation, and obsessive. Information reminiscence is done to be able to enjoy the retelling of stories from one's past. This type can also be used to help someone who may be lacking interest in his or her life and relationships. The ability to recall good memories can help them remember what they do have to be happy about. Evaluative reminiscence is the main type of reminiscence therapy as it is based on Dr. Robert Butler's life review. This process involves recalling memories throughout one's entire life and sharing these stories with other people. Often this is done within group therapy. Obsessive reminiscence occurs when somebody needs to be able to let go of any stress of guilt that may be lingering. By working through these issues it allows them to be at peace with themselves. Reminiscence has also been used to help people deal with the death of a loved one. By sharing stories about the loved one's life they can remember fond memories and gain a sense of peace with the death.

== Method ==
Reminiscence therapy is often used in a nursing home or "geriatric health facility." The structure of reminiscence therapy can vary greatly. In one documented session, a therapist played different songs from the 1920s-1960s and asked the patients which songs resonate or have a special meaning. In another session from the same therapist, the participants shared photographs and had a show-and-tell about why the pictures were important to them.

Psychological research has identified two types of reminiscence therapies that are particularly effective: integrative and instrumental.

- Integrative reminiscence therapy is a process in which individuals attempt to accept negative events in the past, resolve past conflicts, reconcile the discrepancy between ideals and reality, identify continuity between past and present, and find meaning and worth in life. An integrative life review provides individuals with the opportunity to examine events in their lives that may disconfirm negative self-evaluations associated with depression. Many depressed people ignore positive information and focus on memories that support their dysfunctional views, so this therapy helps lead clients to seek fuller, more detailed accounts of their life story and more balanced interpretations of past events. Participants review both good and bad experiences within the context of the entire life, which shows them that negative experiences in one life domain can be mediated with positive events in another. Individuals may disconfirm global, negative evaluations of the self that are associated with depression and begin to develop a more realistic, adaptive view of the self that incorporates both positive and negative attributes.
- Instrumental reminiscence therapy helps the elderly recollect past coping activities and strategies, including memories of plans developed to solve difficult situations, goal-directed activities, and the achievement of one's own goals or goals one helped others meet. Instrumental reminiscence therapy may exert a positive effect on individuals' self-esteem and efficacy by recollection of successful experiences in which individuals acted effectively to control their environment. This approach to reminiscence therapy puts roles and commitments that are no longer rewarding or attainable to the periphery and helps these patients invest in other goals that are more in tune with current conditions of living. This can be especially helpful for the elderly who may not be able to do what they were once capable of doing.

== History of reminiscence ==
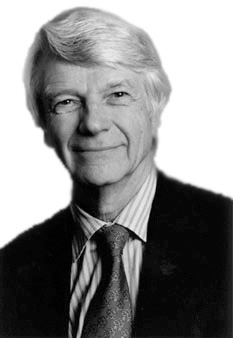
Dr. Robert Butler, one of the main two researchers most associated with this field of work. (Erikson late 1950s, Butler early 1960s)

Before the late 1950s reminiscence was seen as a negative symptom which often lead to mental deterioration. Erik Erikson introduced his concept of the eight stages of psychosocial development which involved the progression of one's life and development from birth until death. The last stage known as late adulthood, brought up the idea of integrity vs. despair. At this stage it becomes important for one to look back on one's life with satisfaction before they die. In 1963, Dr. Robert Butler published a paper on the critical points surrounding the importance of life review and reminiscence. Butler is credited with starting the movement of reminiscence therapy. The next advancement in this area was done by Charles Lewis in 1971. Lewis was able to create the first experimental study of reminiscence. Lewis wanted to look at any cognitive changes that may occur from reminiscence as well as how people perceive themselves. This experiment proved to be worthwhile as in the following years this area became very popular to research. In the following years, research on reminiscence was focused on the functions and benefits of reminiscence. In 1978 The Department of Health and Social Security started a project called "The Reminiscence Aids Project". This project was done in order to start reminiscence as a therapy process. Finally in the 1980s, reminiscence therapy was recognized by institutions and has begun to be used as group therapy. During this time period, there was an increase in the number of professionals trained in this therapeutic process. Reminiscence therapy has continued to be an area of research to this day. While there have been many studies done on reminiscence therapy lately, Butler and Erikson remain the two researchers most associated with this field of work.

== Theories of reminiscence ==
=== Disengagement theory ===
Disengagement theory in reminiscence is used by some therapists and researchers and focuses on the patient withdrawing from social responsibilities. This movement away from social life is encouraged so that the patient (in many cases an elderly person) can brace themselves for the rapid changes associated with the end of life. In withdrawing from interaction with others, disengagement theory aims to prepare the person for the most powerful and taxing separation of death. The hope in using this therapy is that when death comes, it will not be as painful or upsetting an experience as typically thought. The notion can be a comforting one that instead of being fearful patients that participate in the disengagement aspect of reminiscence theory will no longer be afraid but empowered when meeting their end.

=== Ego integrity theory ===
Ego Integrity Theory is based on the individual having a sense of fulfillment and success when looking back on their life and accomplishments. A person who has achieved ego integrity does not fear the uncertainty that comes with meeting their death. In a successful case of ego integrity theory the patient is at peace with the eventuality of death. This theory was developed from Eric Erikson's stages of development in which Integrity vs Despair is a crucial stage for later life psychological development.

=== Continuity theory ===
Disengagement and ego-integrity may offer tools helping the elderly or ill deal with the prospect of death but it is thought that Continuity Theory offers more profound insights when trying to fully understand the true meaning of reminiscence theory. A passage from Lin illustrates the concept of continuity the best

"As individuals move from one stage to the next and encounter changes in their lives, they attempt to order and interpret changes by recalling their pasts. This provides an important sense of continuity and facilitates adaptation. Change is linked to the person's perceived past, producing continuity in inner psychological characteristics and in social behavior and social circumstances."

Reminiscence can provide a mechanism by which individuals adapt to changes that occur throughout life Continuity Theory requires the effective use of remote memory. Reminiscence processes occur in this type of memory which is usually the last memory system to deteriorate. Research has found that frequent exercise of this system improves general cognitive function.

== Therapy ==
Reminiscence therapy makes use of life events by having participants vocally recall episodic memories from their past. It helps provide people with a sense of continuity in terms of their life events. Reminiscence therapy may take place in a group setting, individually, or in pairs depending on the aim of the treatment Reminiscence therapy can also be structured or unstructured within these configurations. While the primary aim of reminiscence therapy is to strengthen cognitive memory components, a secondary goal may be to encourage either intrapersonal development or interpersonal development. These individual needs will determine whether the therapy is conducted in a group setting or alone with a practitioner. Memories are processed chronologically starting at birth and focusing on major, significant life events. The focus is reflection, not simply recall. Reminiscence therapy may use prompts such as photographs, household items, music, or personal recordings.

=== Applications ===
Reminiscence therapy is used predominately in elderly patients This may in part be due to the common disorders reminiscence therapy has been used for are prevalent in the elderly, such as depression. It has often been used in nursing homes or assisted living facilities, as it provides a sense of continuity in one's life and therefore may aid these types of transitions. Patients with chronic conditions may also benefit from reminiscence therapy, as they often suffer socially and emotionally. Other issues have been addressed using reminiscence therapy, including behavioural, social, and cognitive problems. Studies have found group reminiscence therapy sessions may lead to strengthened social relationships and friendships within the group.

==== Improvements ====
Many studies have examined the effects of reminiscence therapy on overall affect. One group of researchers implemented reminiscence therapy into a community in response to a rash of suicides. The researchers administered the therapy to older adults (predominantly women) at a local community center for the elderly. A questionnaire administered after the group reminiscence therapy session revealed that 97.3% of participants enjoyed the experience of talking, 98.7% enjoyed listening to others, 89.2% felt that the group work with reminiscence therapy would help in their daily life, and 92.6% wished to continue in the program. The researchers suggest their results support the previously reported effects of increased life satisfaction and self-esteem. Another study showed that after one session a week for 12 weeks of integrative reminiscence therapy, institutionalized older veterans in Taiwan experienced significant increases in self-esteem and life satisfaction as compared to the control group. However, there is some evidence that RT can improve quality of life, cognition, communication and possibly mood in people with dementia in some circumstances, although all the benefits were small. A recent Cochrane review (2018) concluded that reminiscence therapy can improve quality of life, cognition, communication and possibly mood in people with dementia in some circumstances, although all the benefits were small.

==== Coping skills ====
A few researchers have posited that the positive effects of reminiscence therapy are the result of increased coping skills. Essentially, these researchers argue reminiscence therapy works because it increases the patient's ability to cope and deal with new situations effectively.

Self-positive reminiscences relate to improved psychological well-being through assimilative and accommodative coping, while self-negative reminiscences are associated with reduced psychological well-being through their negative relationships with both types of coping. Assimilative and accommodative coping are protective mechanisms through which the self establishes continuity and meaning for one's life.

- Assimilative coping aims to alter the life situation so that it concurs with one's preferences and objectives, helping people pursue personal goals despite limitations and obstacles.
- Accommodative coping helps patients adjust their goals to accommodate constraints and impairments by revising values and priorities, constructing new meaning from the situation, and potentially transforming personal identity.

Instrumental reminiscence therapy facilitates two additional types of coping: problem focused coping and emotion focused coping. Problem focused coping involves the individual in a goal-oriented effort to alter the situation with an analytic approach to solving the problem. Emotion focused coping helps to create positive interpretations of stress by focusing on personal growth, helps the patient accept responsibility for one's own role in creating the stress and a desire to address this stress, and a distancing of the self from the stressful situation by not being too serious about it or looking for the positive aspects of the stress.

==== Depression ====
Many studies have looked at the effectiveness of reminiscence therapy in clinically depressed older adults. This research suggests reminiscence therapy is a very effective way to reduce depressive symptoms in the elderly. Integrative and instrumental reminiscence therapy helped participants' affect improve over the long term by significantly decreasing depressive symptoms. Another study found that after 12 weeks of integrative reminiscence therapy, institutionalized older veterans experienced significant decreases in depressive symptoms. Older adults with depressive symptoms frequently reminisce as a way to refresh bitter memories, reduce boredom, and prepare for death from Webster's taxonomy (as opposed to conversation, teach/inform, intimacy maintenance, problem solving, identity). Due to this finding, the researchers concluded that if depressed older adults were already reminiscing, although in negative ways, they would make good candidates for reminiscence therapy since they would be comfortable with this activity. Reminiscence therapy may even help alleviate depressive symptoms in patients also suffering from cancer.

==== Dementia ====
Researchers have also studied the effects of reminiscence therapy on older adults who suffer from dementia. In particular, studies have focused on two main benefits of reminiscence therapy for demented elderly: improved cognitive function and an improvement in quality of life (with a focus on improved emotions and overall happiness/mood).

A study in 2007 looked at how reminiscence therapy affected both cognitive and affective function in 102 demented elderly. The study used established scales to determine the effect of reminiscence treatment using a pre- and post-test self-report design. For cognitive function, the study used the Mini-Mental State Examination (MMSE). For affective function the researchers used the Geriatric Depression Scale short form (GDS-SF) to determine the personal opinion of the demented elderly on their state of well-being and the Cornell Scale for Depression in Dementia (CSDD) to analyze how their caregivers felt the patient was doing emotionally. The randomized study found significant improvements in both the MMSE and CSDD scores pre to post test, which is an encouraging sign that reminiscence therapy has a positive effect in helping both cognitive and emotional functions for the demented elderly.

One of the questions in seeing improvement through reminiscence therapy is if the gains are because of the actual type of therapy being used (reminiscing about certain subjects) or if just the increase social interactions with peers causes the progress in cognition and overall mood. A study in 2008 examined this, using an experimental group treated with reminiscence therapy and a control group where they also had group conversations about every-day subjects. MMSE was used to determine the level of dementia prior to the study, and like the 2007 study, examined the cognitive and affective effect of both the reminiscence and conversation therapies on the two groups. For cognition the groups were given a four-item verbal fluency test. For evaluating the participants' mood, quality of daily life, and interest in the treatment, the study used the Todai-shiki Observational Rating Scale (TORS), and for self-report on their overall happiness, the participants took the Saint Marianna Hospital's Elderly Dementia Patients' Daycare Evaluation Table. The results in cognition agreed with the 2007 study, with the reminiscence group recalling more words pre to post test. The control conversation group, however, saw a decrease in words recalled from pre to post test, supporting the argument that it is the actual reminiscing type of therapy that causes the positive cognitive effect, not just any conversation with peers. Finally, the study also showed improvements in both TORS and the Daycare Evaluation Table scores for the reminiscence group over the control, meaning the participants were happier, had improved quality of daily life, and were more attentive to treatment, compared to pre-treatment and versus control group results.

One study looked at reminiscence therapy for people with two types of dementia: Alzheimer's disease and vascular dementia. Those with Alzheimer's disease experienced significant improvement of withdrawal (so they withdrew less and interacted with others more) compared with the control group immediately after intervention. Participants suffering from vascular dementia showed significant improvement of withdrawal and cognitive function compared with the control immediately after intervention and after a 6-month follow-up. Sustained intervention may be required to maintain these effects over time, especially in elderly people with Alzheimer's disease whose improvement in withdrawal was no longer seen after 6 months.

One study that explored the effects of reminiscence therapy on those diagnosed with dementia found that the participants who received reminiscence therapy experienced significantly higher well-being than participants who had been in either the goal-directed group activity or unstructured free time. A case-study of an 88-year-old man suffering from Alzheimer's disease showed that he experienced improved cognitive functioning after individual reminiscence therapy.

== Outcomes ==
To evaluate the changes the patients who undergo reminiscence therapy various behavioural measures are used and recently, brain imaging has begun to be a part of the assessment after treatment.

=== Behavioural evaluation ===
The most frequent characteristics used to measure the outcome of reminiscence therapy on the patients involved are:

- Depressive symptoms
- Psychological well-being
- Ego-integrity
- Meaning or purpose in life
- Mastery
- Cognitive performance
- Social interactions

=== Neuroimaging ===
In patients with vascular dementia, a significant increase in cortical glucose metabolism in bilateral anterior cingulate and in the left inferior temporal lobe, which are areas important for social interaction and remote memories, respectively. The use of single photon emission computed tomography on an elderly patient with Alzheimer's disease revealed greater blood flow to the frontal lobe of the brain, an area that degenerates in those with this disease. This was coupled with positive changes in evaluated behavioural traits.

=== Influencing factors ===
Overall, positive outcomes seem to result from reminiscence therapy, although to differing degrees. The variability in the results is thought to be due to various factors, including the form of reminiscence therapy, the format of the sessions (group versus individual setting), the number of sessions completed, the health, age and gender of the individual, where the patient lives and if the individual had experienced any events that cause major changes in their life.

An evaluation on the forms of reminiscence therapy found life-review therapy had the strongest positive effects on psychological well-being when compared to other life review and simple reminiscence. Life review has been thought to produce greater positive effects compared to reminiscence therapy, due to the increased organization of methods and purpose of this therapy. The benefits of reminiscence therapy occurs independent of the format of the therapy. Improvement in behaviour occurs whether the therapy is conducted on an individual basis in small or large groups. The frequency and duration of the therapy program does not seem to alter the effectiveness of reminiscence.

Many specific groups have been targeted for studying the effects of reminiscence therapy and were evaluated using different measures based on their previously existing condition and the problems associated with it. Those ranking higher in their depression rating showed a greater rate of improvement of their symptoms compared to those exhibiting less depressive symptoms before the therapy began, although improvements were seen across depression levels. Across studies, reminiscence therapy positively influenced patients with dementia evaluated using various measures Specifically in vascular dementia, cortical glucose metabolism increase in areas important for social interaction and remote memories. Those with Alzheimer's Disease had improved blood flow to areas in brain, as previously discussed, and positive changes in evaluated behavioural traits. In patients with leprosy, the greatest positive effects were seen in those with depression but reminiscence therapy did not effect the stage of dementia or cognitive scores.

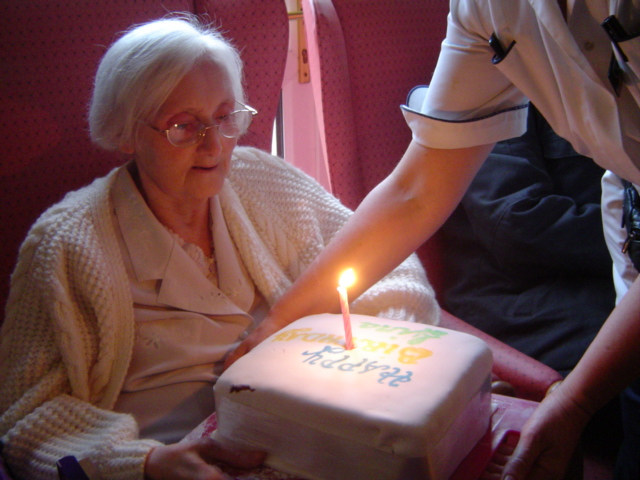
Reminiscence helps older populations cope with aging.

Initially reminiscence was intended for older adults. However, this therapy my prove to be a valuable tool for adults at earlier stages of their life as well. In the elderly, improvement in satisfaction with life and self, self-esteem, increase in social involvement which led to an improvement in their ability to deal with social situations, lower loneliness and alienation. In addition, depressive symptoms, psychological symptoms, psychological well-being, ego-integrity, meaning of/purpose in life, mastery, cognitive performance, social integration, preparation for death all showed improvements after the therapy was concluded. At a follow-up depression, other indicators of mental health, well-being, ego-integrity, cognitive performance, death preparation all remained to be improved from pre treatment. Improvements comparable to those found in the elderly have been found in studies that included younger age brackets. Improvements in depression occur in both females and males. Comparative analysis between males and females on the effects of reminiscence therapy found no evidence for a difference in the success of the therapy between genders. Reminiscence therapy has been conducted in groups composed of residents from group centres and those living in broader communities. Recent analysis suggests that no differences in outcomes from reminiscence exist between the type of community that the individuals are living in during the time of therapy, which contradicts the earlier findings that those living in group homes or care centres benefited less from these programs. Those who experienced various major life events showed improved mental stability including a decrease in depressive symptoms and anxiety. Institutionalized elderly male veterans showed increased self-esteem and life satisfaction and a decrease in symptoms of depression who were involved in a 12-week reminiscence therapy program compared to those that were not.

== Examples ==
The Glenner Town Square is a standalone demonstration project of reminiscence therapy focused on those who seem to have Alzheimer's or some (other) form of dementia. Glenner's goal is described as "capture the years between 1953 and 1961 so that project participants are calmly back in a time period to recollect ages 10 to 30, when "our strongest memories are formed."

== See also ==
- Autobiographical memory
- Memory
- Recall (memory)
- Reminiscence bump
