= Cambridge Behavioural Inventory =

Medical screening questionnaire

The Cambridge Behavioural Inventory (CBI) and its revised version, Cambridge Behavioural Inventory-Revised (CBI-R), are informant-based questionnaires that evaluate the emergence of behavioural symptoms in neurodegenerative brain disorders, including Alzheimer's disease (AD), Huntington's disease (HD), Parkinson's disease (PD), and frontotemporal dementia (FTD).

== Cambridge Behavioural Inventory - Revised ==
The current version of the questionnaire is the Cambridge Behavioural Inventory-Revised (CBI-R). It was developed as a shorter, more user-friendly version of the original CBI.

The CBI was developed to assess a wide range of affective, behavioural and cognitive symptoms in patients with neurodegenerative brain diseases. Components of the questionnaire derive from the Neuropsychiatric Inventory (NPI), the General Health Questionnaire, and an earlier questionnaire found to distinguish between the neuropsychiatric features of frontotemporal dementia and Alzheimer's disease.

The CBI-R consists of 45 items and evaluates 10 functional/behavioural domains: memory and orientation, everyday skills, self-care, abnormal behaviour, mood, beliefs, eating habits, sleep, stereotypic and motor behaviours, and motivation.

=== Scoring ===
The CBI-R is completed by a family member or close friend of the patient. The frequency of a behaviour over the previous month is rated on a scale of 0 to 4, where 0 = never; 1 = a few times per month; 2 = a few times per week; 3 = daily; 4 = constantly. Ratings are totalled for each domain to score the questionnaire.

=== Validity ===
The CBI-R was validated against the original questionnaire in a cohort of 450 patients (PD = 215, AD = 96, HD = 75 and bvFTD = 64). It demonstrated adequate internal consistency, with Cronbach's alpha exceeding 0.7 for seven of nine domains. Correlations between subdomains were high (r > 0.6, p < 0.0001).

== Cambridge Behavioural Inventory ==
The original CBI comprised 81 items assessing 13 domains: memory, orientation and attention, everyday skills, self-care, mood, beliefs, challenging behaviour, disinhibition, eating habits, sleep, stereotypic and motor behaviours, motivation, and insight and awareness. Scoring is identical to the CBI-R.

=== Validity ===
In a preliminary validation study, the Japanese version of the CBI demonstrated high test-retest reliability (Spearman's rho = 0.907, p < .001) over 14 days in a sample of 42 caregivers (AD = 27, FTD = 7, DLB = 2, VD = 2, Other dementias = 4).

With a cohort of 24 caregivers (AD = 19, DLB = 4, TBI = 1), convergent reliability was established by correlating scores on CBI subscales to relevant subscales on the NPI. All but two correlation coefficients (anxiety, stereotypic and motor behaviours) exceeded 0.6 and all correlations were significant at the 0.05 level.

The CBI was found to be useful in distinguishing between the behavioural profiles of FTD, AD, PD and HD in a cohort of 450 patients (PD = 215, AD = 96, HD = 75 and bvFTD = 64).
