= Calcium monosilicide =

Identifiers
CAS Number	12013-55-7
3D model (JSmol)	Interactive image
ChemSpider	4891865
ECHA InfoCard	100.031.430
EC Number	234-587-1
PubChem CID	6336872
UN number	1405
CompTox Dashboard (EPA)	DTXSID10893162
- InChI: InChI=1S/Ca.Si Key: OSMSIOKMMFKNIL-UHFFFAOYSA-N
- SMILES: [Si]=[Ca]

Properties
Chemical formula	CaSi
Molar mass	68.164 g/mol
Density	2.39 g/cm^{3}
Melting point	1,324 °C (2,415 °F; 1,597 K)

Structure
Crystal structure	Orthorhombic, oS8,
Space group	Cmcm, No. 63
Lattice constant	a = 0.4545 nm, b = 1.0728 nm, c = 0.389 nm
Formula units (Z)	4

Hazards
- Occupational safety and health (OHS/OSH)
Main hazards	Flammable gas with water
- GHS labelling
Pictograms	(GHS02: Flammable)
Signal word	Warning
Hazard statements	H261
Precautionary statements	P231+P232, P280, P370+P378, P402+P404, P501
- Except where otherwise noted, data are given for materials in their standard state (at 25 °C [77 °F], 100 kPa). verify (what is ?) Infobox references

Calcium monosilicide (CaSi) is an inorganic compound, a silicide of calcium. It can be prepared by reacting elemental calcium and silicon at temperatures above 1000 °C. It is a Zintl phase, where silicon has oxidation state −2 and covalence 2.
