= BioSimGrid =

Computer modelling project for proteins

BioSimGrid was a project to make data sets from computer simulations in the field of modelling biological systems, particularly biomolecular structures, more accessible to researchers. The project began in 2004 and halted by 2009.

In 2004 designers presented the concept of the project as a "protein data bank extended in time". Other developers presented a web portal for accessing data in the project. Other designers described the project as efficient.

A review in 2006 described how BioSimGrid was a model project for making data from research more open.

BioSimGrid contributors accepted a grant from the National Institutes of Health in 2007.
