= Stuart Cull-Candy =

British neuroscientist

Stuart Cull-Candy FRS FMedSci
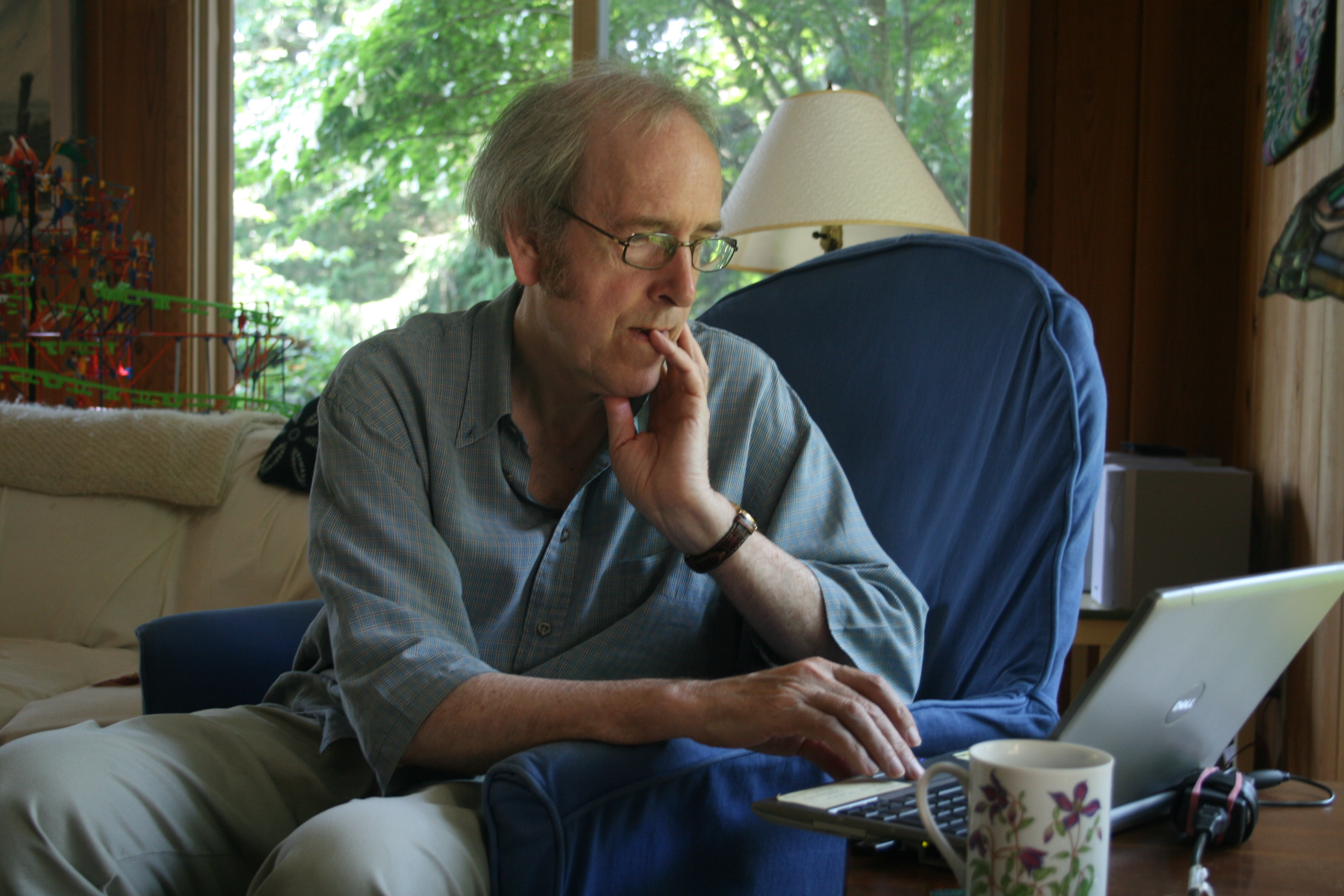
- Professor Stuart Cull-Candy
- Born: Stuart Graham Cull-Candy; 2 November 1946 (age 79)
- Education: Royal Holloway, University of London; University College London; University of Glasgow
- Awards: Royal Society Wolfson Research Merit Award
- Scientific career
- Workplaces: University College London; University of Lund
- Thesis: Pharmacology and Toxicology of Locust Muscle. (1974)
- Notable students: Angus Silver (postdoc)
- Website: www.ucl.ac.uk/biosciences/departments/npp/people/iris-profiles/cull-candy-stuart

Stuart Graham Cull-Candy (born 1946) is a British neuroscientist. He holds the Gaddum Chair of Pharmacology and a personal chair in neuroscience at University College London. He is also a member of the Faculty of 1000 and held a Royal Society – Wolfson Research position.

== Early life and education ==
Cull-Candy earned a Bachelor of Science degree in biology from Royal Holloway, University of London, then a Master of Science degree from University College London (1971), and a PhD from the University of Glasgow in 1974.

== Career and research ==
After working as a Royal Society Exchange Fellow at the University of Lund with Prof Stephen Thesleff, he was awarded a Beit Memorial Research Fellowship to work in UCL's Biophysics Department with Sir Bernard Katz and Prof Ricardo Miledi. He later moved to UCL's Pharmacology Department as a Wellcome Trust Reader and then Professor of Pharmacology. He has been an editorial advisor to Nature, and served on the Editorial Boards of various journals including Neuron, The Journal of Physiology and as a Reviewing Editor on Journal of Neuroscience. Currently he is a member of the Royal Society University Research Fellowships Committee, and the Leverhulme Trust Senior Research Fellowships panel.

His research focuses on understanding molecular and functional properties of glutamate receptor channels underlying fast synaptic transmission in the brain. His research activities also include the study of ionotropic γ-aminobutyric acid and glutamate receptor signalling and regulation of neurotransmitter release. He has been a keen advocate of patch-clamp recording techniques combined with molecular methods for investigating central synaptic transmission.

=== Awards and honours ===
He was awarded the GL Brown Prize by the UK Physiological Society, and was appointed a Howard Hughes International Scholar in 1993 (one of only 20 in the UK). He was elected a Fellow of the Royal Society in 2002, a Fellow of the Academy of Medical Sciences in 2004, an Honorary Fellow of the Physiological Society and a Fellow of the British Pharmacological Society.
