= EDF =

EDF may refer to:

== Organisations ==
- Eclaireurs de France, a French Scouting association
- Électricité de France, a French energy company
  - EDF Energy, their British subsidiary
  - EDF Luminus, their Belgian subsidiary
- Environmental Defense Fund, a US–based nonprofit environmental advocacy group

== Military ==
- Estonian Defence Forces
- Eritrean Defence Forces
- Ethiopian National Defense Force (usually ENDF)
- European Defence Fund
- Joint Base Elmendorf–Richardson, in Anchorage, Alaska

== Science and technology ==
- Earliest deadline first scheduling
- Empirical distribution function
- European Data Format, a medical data format
- Expected default frequency
- Electric ducted fan, an aircraft propulsion device

== Other uses ==
- Earth Defense Force (disambiguation)
- European Development Fund, an instrument for European Union aid for development cooperation outside the EU
