= Earth Defense Force (disambiguation) =

Earth Defense Force is a series of video games created by Japanese studio Sandlot.

Earth Defense Force may also refer to:

- Earth Defense Force (video game), a 1991 video game
- Prefectural Earth Defense Force, a 1983 manga, adapted into anime movie
- The Mysterians (地球防衛軍, Earth Defense Force), a 1957 Japanese science fiction film
- A fictional organization in the film Godzilla: Final Wars
- A fictional organization in Dengeki Sentai Changeman
- A fictional organization in the Dead Space series
- A fictional organization in the Duke Nukem series
- A fictional organization in Disgaea: Hour of Darkness
- A fictional organization in Red Faction
- A fictional organization in the Outer Limits episodes Quality of Mercy and The Light Brigade

== See also ==
- Earth Force (disambiguation)
- EDF (disambiguation)
- Space Force
- Global Defence Force
