= Earth Force =

Earth Force may refer to:

- Earth Force (Marvel Comics), a fictional superhuman team within the Marvel Comics universe consisting of three humans granted elemental powers by Seth
- EarthForce, the military of Babylon 5
- Earth Force (fictional power), a fictional power in Dengeki Sentai Changeman
- E.A.R.T.H. Force, a short-lived American television series

== See also ==
- Earth Defense Force (disambiguation)
