= OpenXDF =

- Filename extension: .xdf
- Uniform Type Identifier (UTI): org.openxdf.xdf
- Latest release: 1.2; June 30, 2009
- Type of format: Electroencephalography and Polysomnography

The Open eXchange Data Format, or OpenXDF, is an open, XML-based standard for the digital storage and exchange of time-series physiological signals and metadata. OpenXDF primarily focuses on electroencephalography and polysomnography.

== History ==
Neurotronics began work on OpenXDF in 2003 with the goal of providing a modern, open, and extensible file format with which clinicians and researchers can share physiological data and metadata, such as signal data, signal montages, patient demographics, and event logs.

Neurotronics released the first draft of the OpenXDF Specification just before the 18th meeting of the Associated Professional Sleep Societies in 2004. Neurotronics has since relinquished control of the format to the OpenXDF Consortium.

As of version 1.0, OpenXDF is 100% backward compatible with the European Data Format (EDF), the current de facto standard format for physiological data exchange.

== Features ==
=== Tiered structure ===
OpenXDF is a tiered framework designed to allow standardized and custom specializations of the format while enforcing a common foundation that provides a high-level of compatibility between unrelated systems.

=== Metadata ===
OpenXDF expands on EDF by providing standardized support for extensive patient information, display montages, annotations, and scoring information.

=== Unicode support ===
OpenXDF requires the use of a XML 1.0 compliant parser that supports UTF-8 and UTF-16.

=== Signal configuration ===
OpenXDF supports fully and independently configurable data signals. Each signal specifies its byte order, whether its samples are signed, the size of its samples, and its sampling rate.

=== Security ===
OpenXDF supports encryption of the XML file using TwoFish in Cipher Feedback (CFB) mode with a 256-bit key created from a UTF-8 encoded password hashed with SHA-256. In addition, OpenXDF supports integrity verification using a SHA-512 hash of the original XML file.

== See also ==
- European Data Format (EDF)
