= Angus Silver =

English neuroscientist

Angus Silver FRS
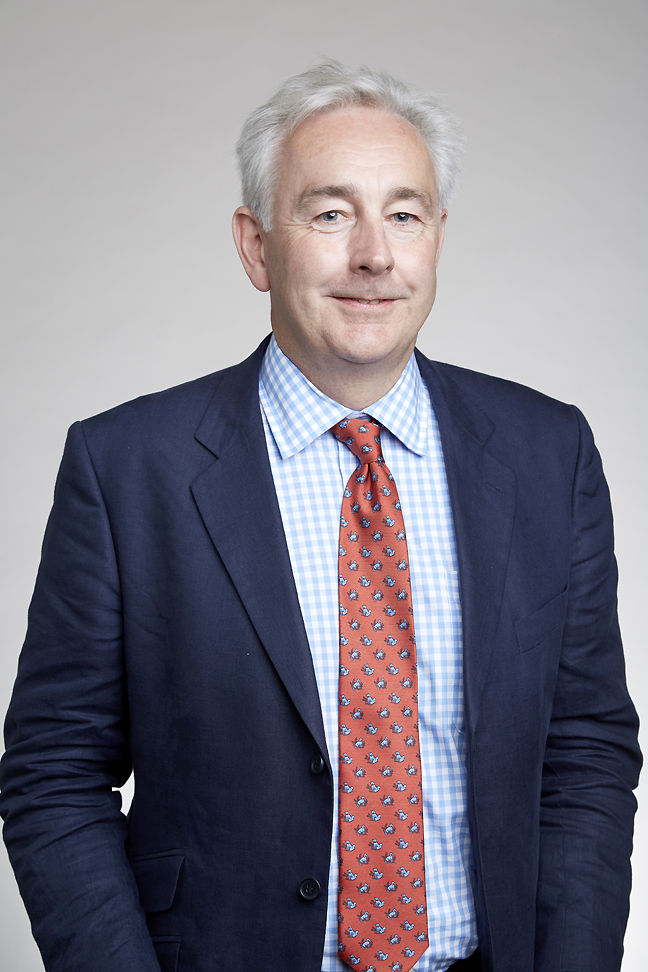
- Silver in 2017
- Born: Robin Angus Silver
- Education: Coventry Polytechnic; University College London
- Scientific career
- Fields: Neuroscience; Neuroinformatics; Microscopy
- Thesis: Calcium as a second messenger in neuronal growth cones (1990)
- Website: silverlab.org

Robin Angus Silver is an English neuroscientist who is professor of neuroscience and a Wellcome Trust Principal Research Fellow at University College London. His laboratory studies neurotransmission and artificial neural networks by combining in vitro and in vivo experimental approaches with quantitative analysis and computational models developed in silico.

== Education ==
Silver was educated at Coventry Polytechnic, where he graduated in 1986 with a Bachelor of Science degree in physical sciences. He completed postgraduate study at University College London, where he was awarded a PhD in neuroscience in 1990 for research investigating calcium signalling and second messenger systems in neural growth cones.

== Research and career ==
Silver's work has contributed to our understanding of synaptic and neuronal function and to information processing in the brain. By developing and applying methods for quantifying synaptic properties his work has shown how central synapses transmit and transform signals and can sustain high frequency signalling. He has quantified the functional properties of electrical synapses and established how neurons can perform certain arithmetic operations.

Using theoretical approaches, he has provided insights into the structure and function of neural circuits, showing that synaptic connectivity within the cerebellar input layer is optimal for encoding information and separating overlapping activity patterns.

Silver's group have developed new tools for studying circuit function. These include a high-speed random access 3D scanning fluorescence microscope that uses an acousto-optic lens to scan and focus the laser beam, enabling measurement of spatially distributed neuronal activity at high speed. He has also coordinated the development of software for building models of neural circuits, (neuroConstruct), a language for standardising model descriptions (NeuroML), and a repository of standardized models and infrastructure for collaborative model development, OpenSourceBrain.

Silver's research has been funded by the Biotechnology and Biological Sciences Research Council (BBSRC), European Research Council (ERC) and the Wellcome Trust.

=== Awards and honours ===
Silver was elected a Fellow of the Royal Society (FRS) in 2017.
