= RNA-binding protein FUS =

Human protein and coding gene

FUS
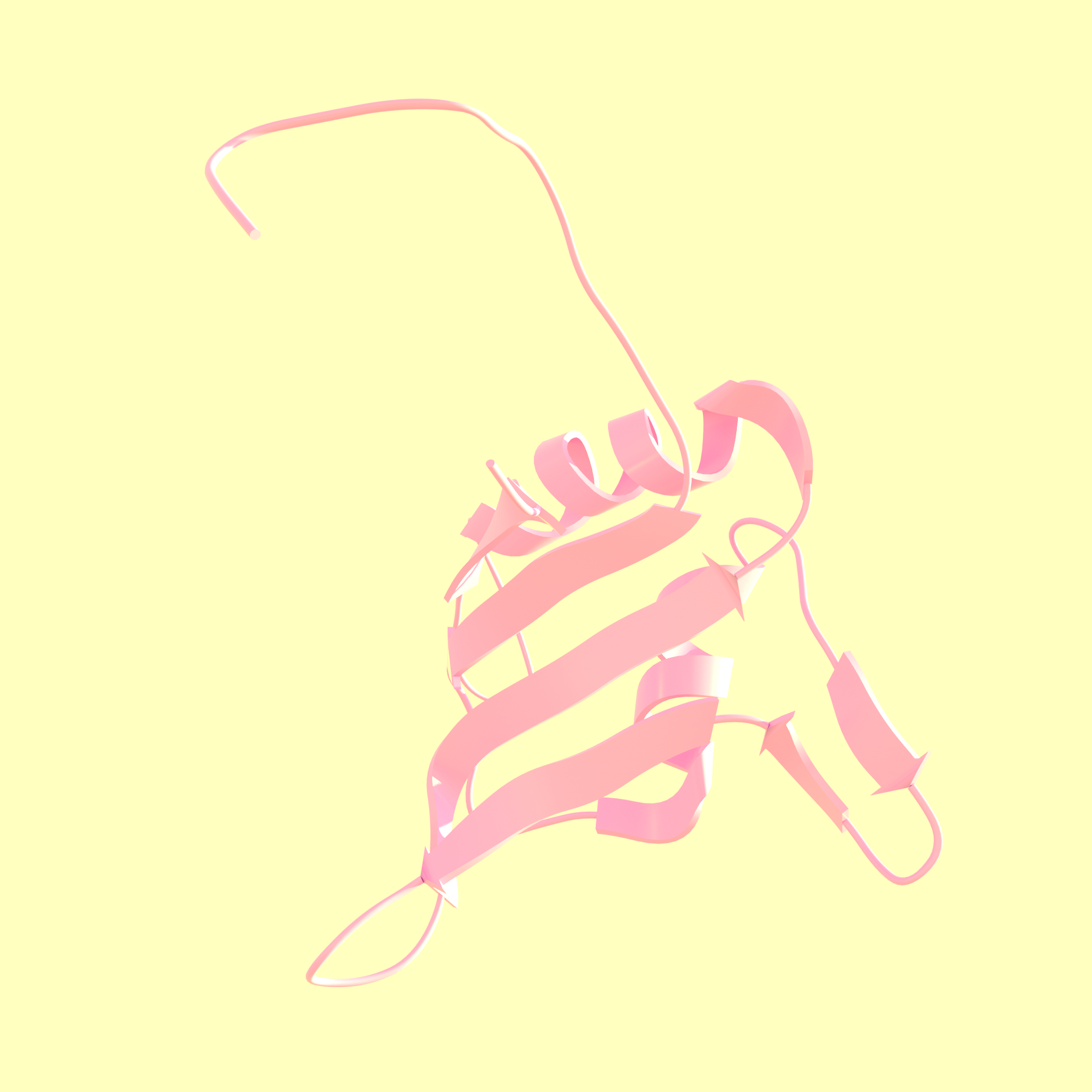

Identifiers
- Aliases: FUS, ALS6, ETM4, FUS1, HNRNPP2, POMP75, TLS, FUS RNA binding protein, altFUS
- External IDs: OMIM: 137070; MGI: 1353633; GeneCards: FUS
Available structures
PDB	Ortholog search: PDBe RCSB
PDB	List of PDB id codes 2LA6, 2LCW, 4FDD, 4FQ3

Gene location (Human)
Chr.	Chromosome 16 (human)
Band	16p11.2	Start	31,180,138 bp
Band	16p11.2	End	31,191,605 bp

Gene location (Mouse)
Chr.	Chromosome 7 (mouse)
Band	7|7 F3	Start	127,566,629 bp
Band	7|7 F3	End	127,584,873 bp
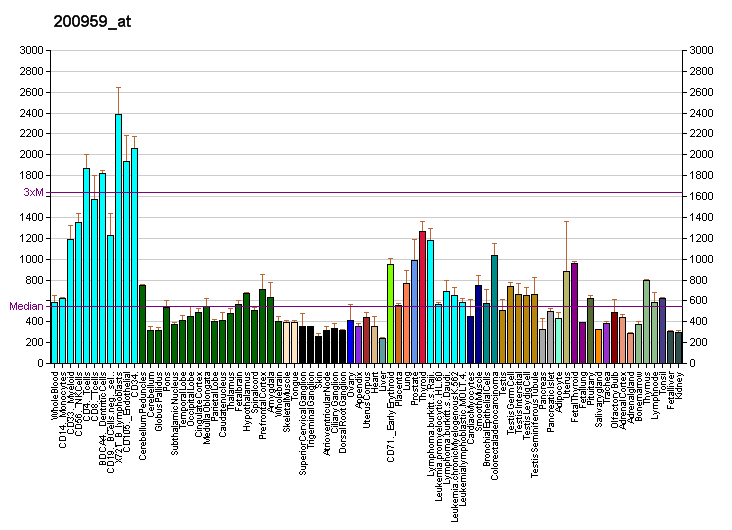

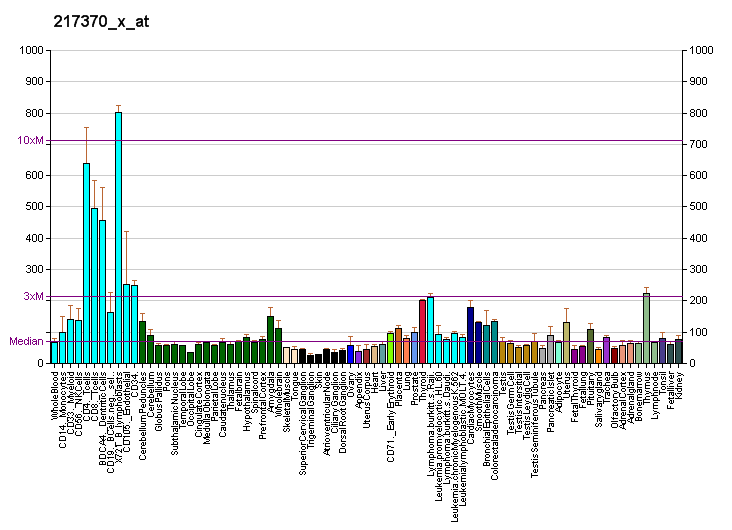
RNA expression pattern
Bgee	Human / Mouse (ortholog); Top expressed in: right testis; ventricular zone; right hemisphere of cerebellum; left testis; ganglionic eminence; right uterine tube; right ovary; left ovary; right lobe of thyroid gland; body of uterus / Top expressed in: somite; ventricular zone; neural layer of retina; otic placode; mandibular prominence; Gonadal ridge; molar; abdominal wall; migratory enteric neural crest cell; saccule; More reference expression data
BioGPS	More reference expression data
Gene ontology
Molecular function	DNA binding; transcription coactivator activity; metal ion binding; retinoid X receptor binding; thyroid hormone receptor binding; myosin V binding; protein binding; identical protein binding; nucleic acid binding; ionotropic glutamate receptor binding; estrogen receptor binding; RNA binding; chromatin binding
Cellular component	cytoplasm; polysome; perikaryon; dendritic spine; nucleoplasm; soma; dendrite; dendritic spine head; perinuclear region of cytoplasm; nucleus
Biological process	cellular response to calcium ion; mRNA splicing, via spliceosome; regulation of transcription, DNA-templated; regulation of transcription by RNA polymerase II; RNA splicing; regulation of RNA splicing; protein homooligomerization; positive regulation of nucleic acid-templated transcription; positive regulation of double-strand break repair via homologous recombination
Sources:Amigo / QuickGO
Orthologs
Databases	NCBI: entry; OMA: entry
Species	Human	Mouse
Entrez	2521	233908
Ensembl	ENSG00000089280	ENSMUSG00000030795
UniProt	P35637	P56959
RefSeq (mRNA)	NM_001010850; NM_001170634; NM_001170937; NM_004960	NM_139149; NM_001347649
RefSeq (protein)	NP_001164105; NP_001164408; NP_004951	NP_001334578; NP_631888
Location (UCSC)	Chr 16: 31.18 – 31.19 Mb	Chr 7: 127.57 – 127.58 Mb
PubMed search
- Wikidata
View/Edit Human	View/Edit Mouse

RNA-binding protein fused in sarcoma/translocated in liposarcoma (FUS/TLS), also known as heterogeneous nuclear ribonucleoprotein P2, is a protein that in humans is encoded by the FUS gene.

== Discovery ==
FUS/TLS was initially identified as a fusion protein (FUS-CHOP) produced as a result of chromosomal translocations in human cancers, especially liposarcomas. In these instances, the promoter and N-terminal part of FUS/TLS is translocated to the C-terminal domain of various DNA-binding transcription factors (e.g. CHOP) conferring a strong transcriptional activation domain onto the fusion proteins.

FUS/TLS was independently identified as the hnRNP P2 protein, a subunit of a complex involved in the maturation of pre-mRNA.

== Structure ==
FUS/TLS is a member of the FET protein family that also includes the EWS protein, the TATA-binding protein TBP-associated factor TAFII68/TAF15, and the Drosophila cabeza/SARF protein.

FUS/TLS, EWS and TAF15 have a similar structure, characterised by an N-terminal QGSY-rich region, a highly conserved RNA recognition motif (RRM), multiple RGG repeats, which are extensively demethylated at arginine residues and a C-terminal zinc finger motif.

== Function ==
The N-terminal end of FUS appears to be involved in transcriptional activation, while the C-terminal end is involved in protein and RNA binding. In addition recognition sites for the transcription factors AP2, GCF, Sp1 have been identified in FUS.

Consistently, in vitro studies have shown that FUS/TLS binds RNA, single-stranded DNA and (with lower affinity) double-stranded DNA. The sequence specificity of FUS/TLS binding to RNA or DNA has not been well established; however, using in vitro selection (SELEX), a common GGUG motif has been identified in approximately half of the RNA sequences bound by FUS/TLS. A later proposal was that the GGUG motif is recognised by the zinc finger domain and not the RRM (80). Additionally, FUS/TLS has been found to bind a relatively long region in the 3′ untranslated region (UTR) of the actin-stabilising protein Nd1-L mRNA, suggesting that rather than recognising specific short sequences, FUS/TLS interacts with multiple RNA-binding motifs or recognises secondary conformations. FUS/TLS has also been proposed to bind human telomeric RNA (UUAGGG)4 and single-stranded human telomeric DNA in vitro.

Beyond nucleic acid binding, FUS/TLS was also found to associate with both general and more specialized protein factors to influence the initiation of transcription. Indeed, FUS/TLS interacts with several nuclear receptors. and with gene-specific transcription factors such as Spi-1/PU.1. or NF-κB. It also associates with the general transcriptional machinery and may influence transcription initiation and promoter selection by interacting with RNA polymerase II and the TFIID complex. Recently, FUS/TLS was also shown to repress the transcription of RNAP III genes and to co-immunoprecipitate with TBP and the TFIIIB complex.

=== FUS-mediated DNA repair ===
FUS appears at sites of DNA damage very rapidly, which suggests that FUS is orchestrating the DNA repair response. The function of FUS in the DNA damage response in neurons involves a direct interaction with histone deacetylase 1 (HDAC1). The recruitment of FUS to double-strand break sites is important for DNA damage response signaling and for repair of DNA damage. FUS loss-of-function results in increased DNA damage in neurons. Mutations in the FUS nuclear localization sequence impairs the poly (ADP-ribose) polymerase (PARP)-dependent DNA damage response. This impairment leads to neurodegeneration and FUS aggregate formation. Such FUS aggregates are a pathological hallmark of the neurodegenerative disease amyotrophic lateral sclerosis (ALS).

== Clinical significance ==
FUS gene rearrangement has been implicated in the pathogenesis of myxoid liposarcoma, low-grade fibromyxoid sarcoma, Ewing sarcoma, and a wide range of other malignant and benign tumors (see FET protein family).

In 2009 two separate research groups analysed 26 unrelated families who presented with a type6 ALS phenotype, and found 14 mutations in the FUS gene.

Subsequently, FUS has also emerged as a significant disease protein in a subgroup of frontotemporal dementias (FTDs), previously characterized by immunoreactivity of the inclusion bodies for ubiquitin, but not for TDP-43 or tau with a proportion of the inclusions also containing alpha-internexin (α-internexin) in a further subgroup known as neuronal intermediate filament inclusion disease (NIFID). The disease entities which are now considered subtypes of FTLD-FUS are atypical frontotemporal lobar degeneration with ubiquitinated inclusions (aFTLD-U), NIFID, and basophilic inclusion body disease (BIBD), which together with ALS-FUS comprise the FUS-proteopathies.

Frontotemporal lobar degeneration (FTLD) is the pathological term for the clinical syndrome of frontotemporal dementia (FTD). FTD differs from the more common Alzheimer's dementia in that memory is relatively well preserved; instead, the disease presents with a more temporal-lobe phenotype. Behavioral variant frontotemporal dementia (bvFTD), progressive non-fluent aphasia (PNFA) and semantic dementia (SD) are the three best-characterised clinical presentations. FUS positive FTLD tends to present clinically as a bvFTD but the correlation between underlying pathology and clinical presentation is not perfect.

=== Toxic mechanism in ALS ===
The toxic mechanism by which mutant FUS causes ALS is currently unclear. It is known that many of the ALS-linked mutations are located in its C-terminal nuclear localisation signal, resulting in it being located in the cytoplasm rather than the nucleus (where wild-type FUS primarily resides). This suggests either a loss of nuclear function, or a toxic gain of cytoplasmic function, is responsible for the development of this type of ALS. Many researchers believe the toxic gain of cytoplasmic function model to be more likely as mouse models that do not express FUS, and therefore have a complete loss of nuclear FUS function, do not develop clear ALS-like symptoms.

== Interactions ==
FUS has been shown to interact with:

- SRSF10
- HDAC1
- ILF3,
- PRMT1,
- RELA,
- RNA polymerase II (C-terminal domain)
- SPI1, and
- TNPO1.
