= Aphasiology =

Study of language impairment

Aphasiology is the study of language impairment usually resulting from brain damage, due to neurovascular accident—hemorrhage, stroke—or associated with a variety of neurodegenerative diseases, including different types of dementia. These specific language deficits, termed aphasias, may be defined as impairments of language production or comprehension that cannot be attributed to trivial causes such as deafness or oral paralysis. A number of aphasias have been described, but two are best known: expressive aphasia (Broca's aphasia) and receptive aphasia (Wernicke's or sensory aphasia).

== Acute aphasias ==
Acute aphasias are often the result of tissue damage following a stroke.

=== Expressive aphasia ===
First described by the French neurologist Paul Broca in the nineteenth century, expressive aphasia causes the speech of those affected to display a considerable vocabulary but to show grammatical deficits. It is characterized by a halting speech consisting mainly of content words, i.e. nouns and verbs, and, at least in English, distinctly lacking small grammatical function words such as articles and prepositions. This observation gave rise to the terms telegraphic speech and, more recently, agrammatism. The extent to which expressive aphasics retain knowledge of grammar is a matter of considerable controversy. Nonetheless, because their comprehension of spoken language is mostly preserved, and because their speech is usually good enough to get their point across, the agrammatic nature of their speech suggests that the disorder chiefly involves the expressive mechanisms of language that turn thoughts into well-formed sentences.

The view of expressive aphasia as an expressive disorder is supported by its frequent co-occurrence with facial motor difficulties, and its anatomical localization. Although expressive aphasia may be caused by brain damage to many regions, it is most commonly associated with the inferior frontal gyrus, a region that overlaps with motor cortex controlling the mouth and tongue, extending into the periventricular white matter. Not surprisingly, this region has come to be known as "Broca's area". However, an intriguing line of research has demonstrated specific comprehension deficits in expressive aphasics as well. These deficits generally involve sentences that are grammatical, but atypical in their word order. The simplest example is sentences in the passive voice, such as "The boy was chased by the girl." Expressive aphasics may have quite a hard time realizing that the girl is doing the chasing, but they do much better with "The mouse was chased by the cat," where world knowledge constraints contribute to the correct interpretation. However, "The cat was chased by the mouse" would likewise be incomprehensible. This evidence suggests that grammatical competence may be a specific function of Broca's area.

Lesions exclusive to Broca's area (the foot of the inferior frontal gyrus) do not produce Broca's aphasia but instead mild dysprosody and agraphia, sometimes accompanied by word-finding pauses and mild dysarthria. Not much is known about what other areas must be damaged in order to produce Broca's aphasia, but some maintain damage to the inferior pre-Rolandic motor strip (the motor cortex region responsible glossopharyngeal muscle control) is also necessary.

=== Receptive aphasia ===
Receptive aphasia was originally described by the German neurologist Karl Wernicke, a contemporary of Broca. Receptive aphasics produce speech that seems fluent and grammatical, but is largely devoid of sensible content. Comprehension is severely impaired, but while patients display a great deal of difficulty comprehending individual words, they can more easily understand words in context. Receptive aphasia is associated with the posterior third of the superior temporal gyrus in the distribution of the inferior division of the middle cerebral artery, known as "Wernicke's area", an area adjacent to the cortex responsible for auditory processing. If the damage extends posteriorly, visual connections are disrupted, and the patient will have difficulty understanding written language. Therefore, the localization of the two best-known aphasias mirrors the grossest dichotomy in brain organization: anterior areas are specialized for motor output, and posterior areas for sensory processing.

A fascinating corollary of this has come from research on aphasias in deaf users of sign language, who show deficits in signing and comprehension analogous to Expressive and Receptive aphasias in hearing populations. These studies demonstrate that the grammatical functions of Broca's area and the semantic functions of Wernicke's area are indeed deep, abstract properties of the language system independent of its modality of expression.

=== Global aphasia ===
Another less commonly known aphasia is global aphasia, which generally manifests itself after a stroke affecting an extensive portion of the brain occurs, including infarction of both divisions of the middle cerebral artery and generally both Broca's area and Wernicke's area. Survivors with global aphasia may have great difficulty understanding and forming words and sentences, and generally experience a great deal of difficulty when trying to communicate. With considerable speech therapy rehabilitation, global aphasia may progress into expressive aphasia or receptive aphasia.

=== Anomic aphasia ===
A person with anomic aphasia have word-finding difficulties. Anomic aphasia, also known as anomia, is a non-fluent aphasia, which means the person speaks hesitantly because of a difficulty naming words or producing correct syntax. The person struggles to find the right words for speaking and writing. Subjects tend to use circumlocutions, in which they speak around the word they can not find, to make up for their loss. People also with anomic aphasia tend to know how to use an object, but rather can not name the aforementioned object. Any damage in or near the zone of language can result in anomic aphasia. Other forms of aphasia often transition into a syndrome of primarily anomic aphasia in the process of recovery.

=== Conduction aphasia ===
Conduction Aphasia is a rare form of aphasia in which fibres in the arcuate fasciculus and superior longitudinal fasciculus are damaged. These fibres are the link between the Wernicke's and Broca's area. Damage to the area connecting comprehension and expression together has the following symptoms: fluent speech, good comprehension, poor oral reading, repetition is poor and transpositions of sounds within words is very common.

== Primary progressive aphasias ==
Primary progressive aphasia is a rare disorder where people slowly lose their ability to talk, read, write, and comprehend what they hear in conversation over a period of time. It was first described as a distinct syndrome by Mesulam in 1982. There are three variants: progressive nonfluent aphasia (PNFA), semantic dementia (SD), and logopenic progressive aphasia (LPA).

== History ==
The nineteenth century marked the most important time in the evolution of aphasiology, beginning with the works of Franz Josef Gall. Gall is the founder of the more modern localization theory and is the origin of the idea of a language center in the brain. However, supporting evidence for the theory that language had its own anatomical representation was not found until the case study of Mr. Leborgne, also known as Tan, by Paul Broca in 1861. The discovery of what is now known as Broca's area was followed years later by Carl Wernicke's famous work, 'The Symptom-Complex of Aphasia: A Psychological Study on an Anatomical Basis' in 1874. This paper is regarded as one of the most influential works in the history of the field of aphasiology. In it, Wernicke described many of the different classifications of aphasia and is the basis for the classical model of aphasia.

== See also ==
- Aphasiology (journal)
- Neurolinguistics
