= 3639 =

3639 may refer to:

- The year in the 37th century
- 3639 (protein), a protein that in humans is encoded by the FUS gene
- 3639 Weidenschilling, a main-belt asteroid
