= Frontotemporal dementia =

Dementia involving the frontal or temporal lobes

- Other names: FTD, Frontotemporal degeneration, Frontal lobe dementia, Pick's disease
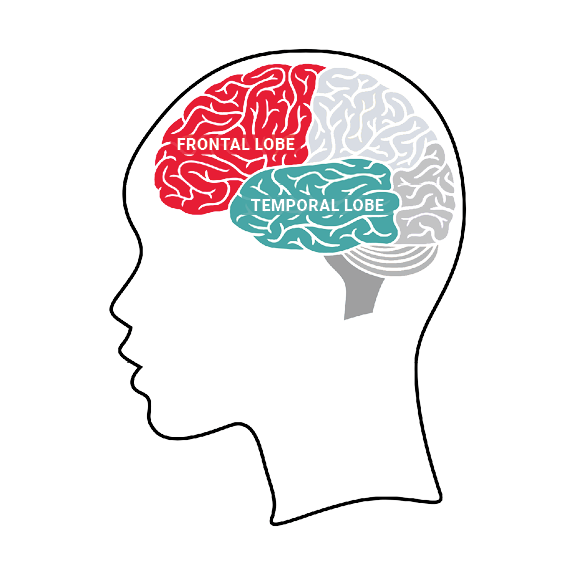
- FTD primarily affects the frontal and temporal lobes of the brain.
- Specialty: Neurology, Psychiatry
- Usual onset: Commonly 45–64 years, but can occur earlier
- Causes: frontotemporal lobar degeneration
- Risk factors: Family history of FTD or ALS; risk-associated mutations of GRN, MAPT, C9orf72 genes, and other less-common genes; ALS diagnosis; environmental risk factors currently unknown
- Diagnostic method: Clinical diagnosis of exclusion based on progressive behavioral, cognitive, communication, or movement-based symptoms, with no other explanation. Supportive evidence from neuroimaging or genetic testing. Confirmed diagnosis via brain autopsy.
- Differential diagnosis: Alzheimer's disease, Parkinsons' disease, Lewy body dementia, Vascular dementia, Mild cognitive impairment, Depression, Generalized anxiety disorder, other mental disorders
- Treatment: As no cures or disease-modifying treatments have been approved, symptom management is the primary focus for FTD. Person-centered care is often used to address heterogeneous symptoms that vary between people.
- Medication: No drugs have been approved for the condition, but medications may be prescribed to manage symptoms.
- Prognosis: Life expectancy is highly variable but is typically 7–13 years.
- Frequency: In 2011 in the United States, 50,000-60,000

Frontotemporal dementia (FTD), also known as frontotemporal degeneration, and historically as Pick's disease, is a family of neurodegenerative disorders, caused by frontotemporal lobar degeneration that affects the frontal and temporal lobes. The FTD family includes behavioral variant FTD, primary progressive aphasia (PPA) and its semantic and nonfluent/agrammatic variants, primary progressive apraxia of speech (PPAOS), progressive supranuclear palsy, and corticobasal syndrome.

Through a mutual risk gene, FTD and amyotrophic lateral sclerosis (ALS) share a clinical spectrum, where symptoms of both disorders can co-occur. Symptoms of FTD will typically match a specific disorder at first, though symptoms of other disorders will begin to show as the disease progresses to different areas of the brain. FTD disorders are a common young-onset dementia occurring under the age of 60.

Approximately 60% of people diagnosed with FTD have no known cause and no family history of FTD or related conditions; this is known as sporadic FTD. While environmental causes and unidentified gene variants are suspected causes of sporadic FTD, research in this area is still ongoing. When people have a family history of FTD, other dementias, or conditions like depression or anxiety, it is referred to as familial FTD, and roughly 20% have an underlying genetic basis. Variants in three genes are responsible for most genetic FTD. Notably, in about 10% of people with seemingly sporadic FTD, a genetic variant is identified.

FTD diagnosis currently relies on clinical examination based on the signs and symptoms experienced and imaging of the brain through magnetic resonance imaging or positron emission tomography. FTD disorders have heterogeneous symptoms and pathological features, which contribute to a lengthy differential diagnostic process and high rates of misdiagnosis. A neuropathological examination after death usually provides a definitive diagnosis by identifying the specific features of FTD subtypes.

There is no cure for FTD, nor are any disease-modifying treatments approved that could slow disease progression. The aim of treatment is to manage symptoms, which is primarily accomplished through non-pharmacological interventions such as person-centric care strategies or physical and occupational therapy. Medication can be used to address symptoms like depression or anxiety, but some drugs, like sleep or antipsychotic medicines, carry a considerable risk of side effects for people with FTD. Death is usually the result of complications of FTD, such as pneumonia or fall-related injuries. The average life expectancy after symptoms start is 7 to 13 years, but varies significantly by individual and FTD subtype.

The clinical features of FTD were first described by Czech-German psychiatrist Arnold Pick between 1892 and 1906. Pick's observations were followed by Alois Alzheimer's first description of tau aggregations in neurons (called "Pick bodies") in 1911. The disorder described by Pick was named "Pick's disease" in 1922. The first research criteria were created in 1994, and the publication was the first to use the term "frontotemporal dementia".

== Classification ==
FTD refers to a diverse group of neurodegenerative diseases whose pathology initially affects neurons in the brain's frontal and temporal lobes. These brain regions control functions such as goal-directed behavior, communication, movement, and muscle control.

FTD subtypes are classified based on the signs and symptoms experienced by the person diagnosed, but the classification criteria do not entirely reflect the deeply heterogeneous pathological underpinnings and clinical phenotypes of FTD. Even among people with the same subtype of FTD, symptoms and pathology are diverse, contributing significantly to an already challenging diagnostic process.

=== Behavioral Variant FTD (bvFTD) ===
The most common type of FTD, bvFTD, is characterized by personality changes, apathy, hyperorality, and a progressive decline in self-control, empathy, and recognition of social norms. Cognition is also commonly affected in bvFTD, with diagnosed people experiencing difficulties with planning and problem-solving. Over time, behavioral and cognitive impairments will affect a person's ability to perform basic activities such as eating and bathing.

Symptoms of bvFTD can overlap with motor-dominant FTD disorders such as PSP, CBS, and ALS-FTD. BvFTD can at first be misdiagnosed as a psychiatric disorder due to overlapping symptoms.

=== Primary Progressive Aphasia (PPA) ===
PPA refers to a family of disorders characterized by language impairment, with a person's diagnosis reflecting the specific language skills affected at symptom onset. Two variants of PPA are more commonly associated with brain pathology seen in FTD: semantic (svPPA) and nonfluent/agrammatic (nfvPPA). In svPPA, people are progressively diagnosed with a loss of word meaning and difficulty recalling object names, making it increasingly difficult to communicate fluently. In nfvPPA, the apraxia of speech makes an affected person's speech gradually slower and more effortful, with aphasia leading to word omission in sentences and a reduced ability to comprehend long sentences.

The logopenic variant (lvPPA), which is associated with difficulty finding words while speaking, is more commonly associated with brain pathology seen in Alzheimer's disease.

=== Primary Progressive Apraxia of Speech (PPAOS) ===
PPAOS is a disorder associated with the progressive loss of the brain's ability to control muscle movements that allow for speech, without loss of the meanings of words or object names. People diagnosed with PPAOS experience features such as slowed speech, increased speech distortions, and longer pauses between words.

As the pathology progresses, people with PPAOS may begin to experience additional motor/movement symptoms and may later receive an additional diagnosis of PSP or CBS.

=== Progressive Supranuclear Palsy (PSP) ===
PSP is a disorder considered by some to be under the FTD umbrella. The disorder is traditionally associated with motor-based symptoms that are commonly referred to as "atypical Parkinsonism." However, emerging research has found that cognitive, behavioral, and communication symptoms are more common in PSP than previously established, heightening the chance for misdiagnosis. PSP with "classic" movement symptoms is classified as PSP Richardson Syndrome or Richardson-Steele variant (PSP-RS) and makes up between 24-46% of cases. PSP-RS symptoms include gaze palsies, postural instability, and akinesia.

The PSP Speech and Language variant (PSP-SL) features language-based symptoms like non-fluent/agrammatic aphasia and primary progressive apraxia of speech, demonstrating the variable presentation of the disorder.

=== Corticobasal Syndrome (CBS) ===
CBS, like PSP, is a traditionally movement-associated disorder considered by some to be under the FTD umbrella, though, like PSP, research is increasingly finding evidence of behavioral, cognitive, and communication symptoms. Typical symptoms of CBS include limb rigidity, bradykinesia, and tremors. A hallmark symptom of CBS is alien limb syndrome, which results in people diagnosed with the disorder experiencing involuntary limb movements and a sense of a limb not belonging to them or feeling "foreign". CBS is the most common cause of alien limb syndrome, comprising at least two-thirds of documented cases.

While accurate estimates for the occurrence of neuropsychiatric symptoms in CBS are lacking, depression, apathy, anxiety, and agitation are commonly documented symptoms experienced by people diagnosed.

=== FTD-ALS Spectrum Disorders ===
FTD and ALS caused by pathogenic variants in specific genes share a clinical spectrum, with it possible for symptoms of either or both disorders to develop in carriers of the gene. In addition to the hallmark motor symptoms of ALS, spectrum disorders can cause behavioral changes like apathy or disinhibition. Language difficulties may also develop, including difficulty recalling correct words in a sentence or omitting words. Not all manifestations of behavioral or language in ALS qualify as FTD-ALS according to diagnostic criteria, nor do all incidents of muscle weakness symptoms in FTD.

Due to the overlap of two challenging symptomologies, FTD-ALS can be an exceptionally difficult disease for people diagnosed and their families. Life expectancy after symptoms start for people diagnosed with FTD-ALS is also shorter than that of other FTD disorders, averaging between 2.7-4.4 years.

== Signs and symptoms ==
Because of the diverse functions of the frontal and temporal lobes, the symptoms of FTD disorders are similarly varied. Even within a specific FTD subtype, the presentation of symptoms and difficulties encountered is typically unique to each person. It is not uncommon for a person experiencing predominant symptoms of one FTD disorder to also have some symptoms of another disorder. The presentation of FTD also varies based on the race of the person diagnosed, with the underlying mechanisms being similarly poorly understood.

While research is ongoing to determine the mechanisms for these varied presentations, it is generally understood that overlap between underlying proteins, genetics, and affected brain regions contribute significantly to the heterogeneity of FTD symptoms.

=== Behavioral, personality, and cognitive ===
When such symptoms occur, uncharacteristic changes in personality are one of the most noticeable signs of FTD for families and friends of people diagnosed. Changes in overall personality, apathy, disinhibition, loss of empathy, and compulsive behaviors are among the more common behavioral symptoms associated with FTD disorders. Often, symptoms such as apathy or loss of empathy are misdiagnosed as being related to depression, work stress, or a recent adverse life event.

Changes in diet, such as compulsive ingestion of sweets or carbohydrates, are also common in people experiencing behavioral symptoms. In addition to changes in diet, hyperoral symptoms like a compulsive need to place inedible and edible objects in one's mouth or grinding of teeth can occur.

Resistant and aggressive behaviors are also possible as behavioral symptoms. Aggression in FTD frequently results from frustration, though aggressive behaviors can arise seemingly at random. Determining triggers for aggression or resistance can be difficult for caregivers and family members of people with such symptoms due to possible communication-based symptoms or anosognosia. Still, research has found that anticipating and working to negate triggers can help prevent them, while maintaining calm and finding ways to redirect frustration can help safely negate aggression or resistance when it occurs.

Especially in bvFTD, behavioral symptoms can come with cognitive impairments, such as difficulties with executive functioning. People with cognitive symptoms of FTD may experience trouble planning the day, making questionable financial choices, or making uncharacteristic mistakes at work.

=== Speech and language ===
Speech and language symptoms in FTD typically revolve around the progressive loss of the ability to speak, read, write, and understand spoken language. Apraxia of speech, anomia, and impaired word comprehension are common symptoms. These symptoms are typically associated with PPA or PPAOS. When a non-PPA or PPAOS FTD disorder develops speech and language symptoms, the diagnostic process is further complicated by the overlap of behavioral and movement-based symptoms with other dementias and neuropsychiatric disorders.

Apraxia of speech is a motor speech symptom that affects a person's ability to coordinate the movements of the muscles involved in speaking. People with AOS describe knowing what they want to say but having difficulty coordinating the precise movements of the mouth, tongue, and lips required to produce speech sounds, words, and sentences, and to do so quickly.

Nonfluent/agrammatic symptoms affect a person's speaking ability, making it progressively difficult while leaving single-word comprehension intact. Agrammatic symptoms typically result in speech becoming restricted to shorter sentences, with the ability to comprehend longer sentences usually becoming impaired over time. Mutism is possible due to a pathology that produces nonfluent/agrammatic symptoms.

Semantic symptoms of FTD impair a person's ability to comprehend what is being said to them, with the meanings of words progressively being lost. When speaking, it can be difficult for someone with such symptoms to find the right word (anomia) or recognize what objects are called and their purpose. Surface dyslexia and dysgraphia are also potential impairments that can develop, making reading and writing words difficult for people diagnosed.

While more common with Alzheimer's pathology, logopenic symptoms can still develop in FTD. Logopenic symptoms impact single-word retrieval, which can lead to people diagnosed pausing more or frequently engaging in circumlocution during conversation. Errors in phonological speech are also common with logopenic symptoms, with affected people substituting sounds made with one area of the mouth for another.

=== Motor functions ===
Motor symptoms of FTD can alternatively be categorized as atypical Parkinsonism or ALS-like, though in some people, both symptom types can co-occur. Common motor symptoms of FTD can include impairments to fine motor skills, postural instability, and dystonia. In FTD-ALS Spectrum Disorders, behavioral and cognitive symptoms typically develop first, which raises the risk for misdiagnosis as a neuropsychiatric disorder or a related form of dementia. Research has found that ALS-like motor symptoms are the most common in FTD, followed by Parkinsonian symptoms.

In people with FTD-ALS, common symptoms of ALS, such as gait disturbances, dysphagia, and falls, typically develop as the underlying disease spreads to the upper or lower motor neurons. There is evidence that some symptoms and anatomical features of FTD-ALS are specific to a gene; for example, bulbar symptoms are typically associated with a pathogenic expansion in C9orf72. Owing to their pathological overlap, some drugs for ALS and Parkinson's disease may provide relief for symptoms of FTD-ALS.

The symptom overlap of ALS and Parkinson's disease already creates an opportunity for misdiagnosis for either disorder, with the possibility of misdiagnosis raised for people experiencing Parkinsonian symptoms of FTD, due in part to unfamiliarity with the disorder. In addition to classic Parkinson's symptoms like postural instability and rigidity, people with FTD (in particular, PSP) can develop supranuclear gaze palsies. Because of the pathological and anatomical nature of PSP and CBS, visuospatial defects can manifest alongside Parkinsonian-like movement symptoms (though they are more common with CBS).

=== Progression ===
FTD disorders are some of the most common young-onset dementias affecting people younger than 60, though the mechanisms that cause them to develop earlier in life are not known. The majority of people diagnosed with FTD are older than 60, but when a person has young onset dementia, FTD is a likely cause.

Due to the highly heterogeneous nature of FTD, even people with the same disorder may experience different symptoms at the initial onset. This heterogeneous presentation increases over time as the underlying disease spreads to other brain regions; while symptoms will initially resemble a specific FTD disorder, symptoms from different forms of FTD are likely to develop. In a person with FTD-ALS, for example, behavioral symptoms resembling bvFTD are likely to present before classic ALS motor symptoms, with language symptoms akin to svPPA developing after motor signs. Regardless of which category of FTD symptoms develops first, the progression of the disease will inevitably lead to impairment across multiple functional domains and require increasing levels of care.

The heterogeneity of FTD and the current lack of biomarkers specific to any FTD disorder make it difficult to track the progression of the disorder. Monitoring its progression is currently accomplished through clinical observation, with symptoms such as incontinence, loss of communication, loss of interest in eating, or increasing difficulty with walking or fine motor tasks typically signaling a shift into advanced disease stages. Impairments to speech and language and the presence of anosognosia can make late-stage FTD care difficult, especially for informal caregivers like family and friends.

The heightened risk of complications and the debilitating nature of advanced FTD typically require a shift to around-the-clock care. Additionally, advanced FTD will often leave people diagnosed unable to advocate for themselves, requiring family members to make complicated care decisions for their loved one if advance care directives are not in place. Even in situations where a person with advanced FTD is placed in a care facility or hospice setting, unfamiliarity with the heterogeneous nature of FTD and its effects on behavior can create challenges for healthcare providers and ultimately families.

== Causes ==
A genetic cause can be identified in an estimated 30% of people diagnosed with FTD. However, for the majority of people diagnosed, the cause is unknown. Therefore, an estimate of 50-70% of FTD cases are thought to be sporadic or of unknown causes. Research and drug development have focused heavily on genetic FTD due to the lack of biomarkers for sporadic FTD. Environmental factors are being studied for potential links to the development of FTD, but there is currently not enough evidence to draw definitive conclusions.

=== Genetics ===
The majority of genetic FTD is caused by pathogenic variants in one of three genes: C9orf72, GRN, and MAPT. Additionally, pathogenic variants in the genes TARDBP, TBK1, SQSTM1, and VCP, and other genes are less common but documented causes of FTD. There are several other genes that are believed to cause FTD, but additional evidence for some of these genes is needed. It is also believed there are additional genes that have yet to be linked to FTD.

Genetic Causes of FTD
Gene	Protein	Frequency: Familial FTD	Frequency: Sporadic FTD
C9orf72	C9orf72	20-30%	6%
GRN	Progranulin	5-25%	5%
MAPT	Tau	5-20%	0-2%
TBK1	TBK1	3%	2-4%
SQSTM1	p62	1-3%	1-3%
TARDBP	TDP-43	1%	1%

The wide variety of genes associated with FTD contributes to the heterogeneous presentation of symptoms across disorders. A significant factor in this heterogeneity is the association of variants of certain genes with specific FTD disorders; C9orf72, for example, is most associated with FTD-ALS spectrum disorders. However, the presence of a gene variant is not enough to predict the course of FTD due to the underlying heterogeneity of pathological mechanisms in each subtype. For instance, while it is uncommon, a person with a C9orf72 expansion can develop symptoms of PPA.

Despite shared pathological and genetic factors and a more frequent family history among people with FTD compared to those with ALS, genetic testing and counseling recommendations only exist for ALS. Genetic testing and counseling services are underutilized by people with FTD, only being offered or completed by 2-23%% of people diagnosed compared to approximately 73% in ALS. Experts are increasingly calling for genetic testing to become part of routine clinical practice for people affected by FTD, with an emphasis on providing genetic counseling to educate families on the various aspects of testing and the implications of test results.

== Pathophysiology ==
Despite significant gaps in the field’s understanding of them, the pathological processes underlying FTD are generally understood to be just as heterogeneous as its symptomology. The diverse range of initial symptoms mirrors the variability of physiological processes affected by the onset of FTD progression, with the increasing heterogeneity of symptoms over time reflecting the spread of FTD to other brain regions. How these diverse pathophysiological processes begin is unknown, but scientists suspect many genetic, proteomic, and cellular mechanisms.

=== Neuropathology ===
The most visible feature of FTD during brain autopsy is its cortical atrophy patterns. While atrophy in FTD can affect other brain regions, it is often most pronounced in the frontal and temporal lobes. Atrophy patterns are often varied depending on factors such as risk genes and which proteins have become dysfunctional. Inclusion bodies in FTD are usually composed of one of three main dysfunctional proteins: TDP-43, tau, and FET proteins (such as FUS and TAF15.)

Like many other neurodegenerative diseases, a common feature of FTD is co-pathology. Especially in later-onset FTD, other pathologies in addition to the primary or expected protein pathology may be present.

=== Biochemistry ===
There are likely many complex factors that lead to neuronal damage and widespread pathology in FTD. But data from genetics, laboratory models, and clinical studies have identified multiple pathways that contribute to pathology.

Aggregated proteins in FTD, such as TDP-43, tau, and FUS, contribute to neuronal stress in a variety of ways by interfering with cellular functions such as the transport of necessary factors and signaling within the cell.

Major Dysfunctional Proteins in FTD.
1. 50.0%: TDP-43
2. 40.0%: Tau
3. 10.0%: FUS, EWSR1, TAF15

A major hallmark in some cases of FTD is translocation to the cytoplasm of typically nuclear RNA-binding proteins, the most-studied being TDP-43 and FUS. Generally, the absence of these RNA-binding proteins leads to defects in RNA processing, stability, and transport. In turn, significant transcriptomic changes and dysfunctional products such as cryptic peptides impact central neuronal functions. MicroRNAs and long noncoding RNAs are also dysregulated and can impact various steps of transcription and translation. At baseline, TDP-43 and FUS participate in the formation of stress granules as protective cellular structures under healthy conditions, which become dysfunctional in disease, directly contributing to neuronal stress.

In cases of FTD where tau accumulates, this can lead to instability of microtubules, which disrupts both neuronal structure and axonal transport of key cargo to synapses. The cytoskeleton can be indirectly affected aside from tau, such as TDP-43-associated RNA processing defects, or defects in the lysosome that prevent proper microtubule breakdown and synthesis. In all cases, cytoskeletal instability can lead to vulnerability in long projections of neurons, and in transport within the neuron, leading to cellular dysfunction.

Beyond aggregation of specific proteins, there is evidence of disrupted proteostasis in FTD, and in other neurodegenerative diseases, including impairments in the ubiquitin–proteasome system (UPS) and autophagy–lysosome pathways. Variants in FTD-associated genes such as VCP, SQSTM1, and OPTN also affect protein degradation in FTD and ALS. Dysfunctional proteostasis and specific protein aggregation are likely to form a positive feedback loop in which protein aggregation further inhibits proteostasis mechanisms, and vice versa.

Variants in the GRN gene, which encodes the protein progranulin, are associated with impaired lysosomal function, as well as the TMEM106B gene. Similarly, repeat expansions of the C9orf72 gene impair autophagy initiation and vesicle trafficking. Dysfunction of these pathways impacts the clearance of cellular waste. Thus, the buildup of damaged proteins and organelles, and other toxic products, can prevent the growth of neuronal projections and contribute to neuronal stress.

Inflammation in the brain is a common hallmark of neurodegenerative diseases, often identified as activation of microglia and astrocytes in affected brain regions. There is also increased expression of immune mediators such as cytokines and complement proteins. Complement is known to facilitate synaptic pruning, which may lead to injury when overactive. There may also be loss of immune regulatory function in genes such as GRN, leading to dysregulated inflammatory responses. It is an area of active research to understand if inflammation in the brain precedes or follows the initial biological indications of disease in FTD and related disorders.

Metabolism changes are also documented in FTD, as are markers of oxidative stress. Glucose hypometabolism is a marker of neurodegeneration and can be visualized in FTD via FDG-PET. Lipid metabolism changes are also a focus in FTD, with studies showing changes in key lipids found in myelin, membranes, and lipids involved in signaling pathways. In addition, increased production of reactive oxygen species (ROS) and mitochondrial dysfunction has been detected, interfering with cells’ ability to maintain energetic demands to perform vital functions.

Although not completely understood, the spreading of misfolded proteins has been a major focus of ongoing research. This includes investigation of physical connections between cells and networks, prion-like seeding, and transfer of proteins via extracellular vesicles, among other mechanisms.

Several pathological mechanisms, such as genetics, protein aggregation, neuroinflammation, and other factors, are thought to converge on dysfunction and or loss of synapses between neurons, including impaired synaptic signaling, synaptic plasticity, and neurotransmitter balance. Sustained synaptic dysfunction is connected with cognitive and behavioral changes, although precise mechanisms of synaptic dysfunction and therapeutic options are an ongoing area of study.

== Diagnosis ==
FTD is traditionally difficult to diagnose owing to the diverse nature of the associated symptoms. Signs and symptoms are classified into three groups based on the affected functions of the frontal and temporal lobes: These are behavioral variant frontotemporal dementia, semantic dementia, and progressive nonfluent aphasia. An overlap between symptoms can occur as the disease progresses and spreads through the brain regions.

Structural MRI scans often reveal frontal lobe and/or anterior temporal lobe atrophy, but in early cases the scan may seem normal. Atrophy can be either bilateral or asymmetric. Registration of images at different points of time (e.g., one year apart) can show evidence of atrophy that otherwise at individual time points may be reported as normal. Many research groups have begun using techniques such as magnetic resonance spectroscopy, functional imaging, and cortical thickness measurements in an attempt to offer an earlier diagnosis to the FTD patient. Fluorine-18-fluorodeoxyglucose positron emission tomography scans classically show frontal and/or anterior temporal hypometabolism, which helps differentiate the disease from Alzheimer's disease, as the PET scan in Alzheimer's disease classically shows biparietal hypometabolism.

Meta-analyses based on imaging methods have shown that frontotemporal dementia mainly affects a frontomedial network discussed in the context of social cognition or "theory of mind". This is entirely in keeping with the notion that on the basis of cognitive neuropsychological evidence, the ventromedial prefrontal cortex is a major locus of dysfunction early on in the course of the behavioral variant of frontotemporal degeneration. The language subtypes of FTLD (semantic dementia and progressive nonfluent aphasia) can be regionally dissociated by imaging approaches in vivo.

The confusion between Alzheimer's and FTD is justifiable due to the similarities between their initial symptoms. Patients do not have difficulty with movement and other motor tasks. As FTD symptoms appear, it is difficult to differentiate between a diagnosis of Alzheimer's disease and FTD. There are distinct differences in the behavioral and emotional symptoms of the two dementias, notably, the blunting of affect seen in FTD patients. In the early stages of FTD, anxiety and depression are common, which may result in an ambiguous diagnosis. However, over time, these ambiguities fade away as this dementia progresses and defining symptoms of apathy, which are highly prevalent in FTD, start to appear.

Recent studies over several years have developed new criteria for the diagnosis of behavioral variant frontotemporal dementia (bvFTD). The confirmatory diagnosis is made by brain biopsy, but other tests can be used to help, such as MRI, EEG, CT, and physical examination and history. As of 2011, six distinct clinical features have been identified as symptoms of bvFTD.

1. Disinhibition
2. Apathy / inertia
3. Loss of sympathy / empathy
4. Perseverative / compulsive behaviors
5. Hyperorality
6. Dysexecutive neuropsychological profile

Of the six features, three must be present in a patient to diagnose one with possible bvFTD. Similar to standard FTD, the primary diagnosis stems from clinical trials that identify the associated symptoms, instead of imaging studies. The above criteria are used to distinguish bvFTD from disorders such as Alzheimer's and other causes of dementia. In addition, the criteria allow for a diagnostic hierarchy distinguished possible, probable, and definite bvFTD based on the number of symptoms present.

A 2021 study, determined that using cerebrospinal fluid (CSF) biomarkers of pathologic amyloid plaques, tangles, and neurodegeneration, collectively called ATN, can be useful in diagnosing FTD.

=== Neuropsychological tests ===
The progression of the degeneration caused by bvFTD may follow a predictable course. The degeneration begins in the orbitofrontal cortex and medial aspects such as ventromedial prefrontal cortex. In later stages, it gradually expands its area to the dorsolateral prefrontal cortex and the temporal lobe. Thus, the detection of dysfunction of the orbitofrontal cortex and ventromedial cortex is important in the detection of early stage bvFTD. As stated above, a behavioral change may occur before the appearance of any atrophy in the brain in the course of the disease. Because of that, image scanning such as MRI can be insensitive to the early degeneration and it is difficult to detect early-stage bvFTD.

In neuropsychology, there is an increasing interest in using neuropsychological tests such as the Iowa gambling task or Faux Pas Recognition test as an alternative to imaging for the diagnosis of bvFTD. Both the Iowa gambling task and the Faux Pas test are known to be sensitive to dysfunction of the orbitofrontal cortex.

The Faux Pas Recognition test is intended to measure one's ability to detect faux pas types of social blunders (accidentally making a statement or an action that offends others). It is suggested that people with orbitofrontal cortex dysfunction show a tendency to make social blunders due to a deficit in self-monitoring. Self-monitoring is the ability of individuals to evaluate their own behavior to make sure that their behavior is appropriate in particular situations. The impairment in self-monitoring leads to a lack of social emotion signals. The social emotions such as embarrassment are important in the way that they alert the individual to adapt social behavior in an appropriate manner to maintain relationships with others. Though patients with damage to the OFC retain intact knowledge of social norms, they fail to apply it to actual behavior, because they fail to generate social emotions that promote adaptive social behavior.

The other test, the Iowa gambling task, is a psychological test intended to simulate real-life decision making. The underlying concept of this test is the somatic marker hypothesis. This hypothesis argues that when people have to make complex uncertain decisions, they employ both cognitive and emotional processes to assess the values of the choices available to them. Each time a person makes a decision, both physiological signals and evoked emotion (somatic markers) are associated with their outcomes, and this accumulates as experience. People tend to choose the choice which might produce the outcome reinforced with positive stimuli; thus it biases decision-making towards certain behaviors while avoiding others. It is thought that somatic markers are processed in the orbitofrontal cortex.

The symptoms observed in bvFTD are caused by dysfunction of the orbitofrontal cortex; thus these two neuropsychological tests might be useful in detecting early-stage bvFTD. However, as self-monitoring and somatic marker processes are so complex, it likely involves other brain regions. Therefore, neuropsychological tests are sensitive to the dysfunction of orbitofrontal cortex, yet are not specific to it. The weakness of these tests is that they do not necessarily show dysfunction of the orbitofrontal cortex.

In order to solve this problem, some researchers have combined neuropsychological tests which detect the dysfunction of orbitofrontal cortex into one grouping, so that it increases its specificity to the degeneration of the frontal lobe, in order to detect early-stage bvFTD. They invented the Executive and Social Cognition Battery which comprises five neuropsychological tests:

- Faux Pas test
- Hotel task
- Iowa gambling task
- Mind in the Eyes
- Multiple Errands task

The result has shown that this combined test is more sensitive in detecting the deficits in early bvFTD.

== Management ==
Currently, there is no cure for FTD. Treatments are available to manage the behavioral symptoms. Rehabilitation services supporting every day functioning have demonstrated some positive results, in particular the Tailored Activity Programme, which is occupational therapy based. Positive behavior support (PBS) has also been identified as potentially beneficial for people with bvFTD. Pharmacologic therapy is primarily aimed towards managing neuropsychiatric symptoms associated with FTD. Disinhibition, hyperorality, and compulsive behaviors can be controlled by selective serotonin reuptake inhibitors (SSRIs). Agitation or aggression can be controlled with small doses of atypical antipsychotics. Although Alzheimer's and FTD share certain symptoms, they cannot be treated with the same pharmacological agents because the cholinergic systems are not affected in FTD.In fact, cholinesterase inhibitors and memantine, used frequently in the treatment of Alzheimer's disease, have not shown benefit and may even worsen behavioral symptoms in FTD.

== History ==
The first descriptions of what is now known today as FTD were made in the late 19^{th} century by Arnold Pick. In 1891, Pick first described "dementia praecox" or premature dementia, which is today known as schizophrenia; this work would lay the foundation for Pick's later explorations on FTD. One hundred twenty years after this discovery, scientists revisited Pick's work and found evidence of possible neurobiological links between schizophrenia and bvFTD. Pick's next major publication in 1892 more extensively described the features of FTD; in a case report, Pick described a person who presented with behavioral and language problems, and asymmetric atrophy of the left temporal lobe. The person described in this report has retrospectively been identified as having svPPA.

Pick reported four additional people with similar features over the next few years; in 1906, he described a person with disinhibition (a common feature of bvFTD) and mixed apraxia. It would not be until 1920 that pupils of Pick would create the first terms specific to the disorder family: Pick's atrophy to refer to the shrinkage of the frontal and temporal lobes, Pick bodies for the tau-based inclusion bodies found in specific cases of FTD-tau, and Pick's disease, which previously referred to FTD as a whole but now exclusively refers to the tauopathy associated with Pick bodies.

German psychiatrist Emil Kraepelin would expand on the concept of dementia praecox, introducing a system for classifying mental disorders and dementias and promoting a hypothesis that the main origin of psychiatric disorders was a neurophysiological malfunction. Kraepelin theorized dementia praecox in particular was the result of a progressive neurodegenerative disease that inevitably resulted in a loss of cognitive function.

The pace of research was nearly halted by the onset of the Second World War, with many prominent research centers of the 19^{th} century destroyed or damaged in the fighting. The work of Norman Geschwind, who translated and reinterpreted the works of prominent pioneers such as Pick, helped bring the understanding of behavioral neurology to the study of dementia in North America, an essential step in furthering the knowledge of less-common dementias, like FTD. Over the following decades, the symptomatology and neurophysiological underpinnings of FTD were expanded through the work of researchers in the United States and Europe.

A series of studies, books, and theses by successive European researchers in the 1950's established the role of family history in Pick's Disease and the clinical and histological differences between it and Alzheimer's disease^{89}. In 1974, Switzerland-based scientists Jean Constantinidis, Jacques Richard, and René Tissot proposed a classification system for Pick's disease based on certain neurophysiological features. Jeffery Cummings and Leo W. Duchen reported five people with Pick's disease in 1981, featuring behavioral changes and language impairments with severe anterior temporal atrophy, which is now recognized as an MRI sign of FTD. In 1982, Marsel Mesulam, who studied patients with nonfluent and fluent aphasia without Alzheimer's pathology, first proposed the term primary progressive aphasia to describe the disorder. Mesulam's work was followed by that of Bruce Miller, whose 1991 paper described the neuropsychological, clinical and SPECT signs of FTD. In 1989, Snowden suggested the term semantic dementia to describe the patient with predominant left temporal atrophy and aphasia that Pick described.

The first step towards the modern understanding of FTD came in 1994 with the publication of the first research criteria for what was now termed frontotemporal dementia. This would be followed by the first consensus diagnostic criteria, which was published in 1998. The initial concept of the ALS-FTD spectrum was established by a 2011 study that identified a variant of the gene C9orf72 as the most common cause of both genetic FTD and ALS. In the same year, diagnostic criteria were developed for bvFTD and PPA disorders. Diagnostic criteria for PSP was developed in 2017 by the International Movement Disorders Society. In 2011, the International Behavioural Variant FTD Criteria Consortium made the most recent revision of the clinical research criteria for bvFTD.

A nonprofit organization, the Association for Frontotemporal Degeneration (AFTD) was founded in 2002 and convenes a number of scientific conferences, a global FTD registry, and provides investment in research to slow and potentially treat the disease.

== Notable cases ==
People who have been diagnosed as having FTD (often referred to as Pick's disease in cases of the behavioral variant) include:

- John Berry (1963–2016), American hardcore punk musician and founding member of the Beastie Boys
- Clancy Blair (1960–2024), American developmental psychologist and professor
- Don Cardwell (1935–2008), Major League Baseball pitcher
- Jerry Corbetta (1947–2016), frontman, organist and keyboardist of American psychedelic rock band Sugarloaf
- Ted Darling (1935–1996), Buffalo Sabres television announcer
- Robert W. Floyd (1936–2001), computer scientist
- Curtis Hanson (1945–2016), American film director, screenwriter, and producer
- Lee Holloway (born 1982), computer scientist, co-founder of Cloudflare
- Colleen Howe (1933–2009), sports agent and ice hockey team manager, known as "Mrs. Hockey"
- Kazi Nazrul Islam (1899–1976) national poet of Bangladesh
- Rev. Jesse Jackson (1941–2026) American civil rights leader
- Terry Jones (1942–2020), Welsh comedian (Monty Python) and director
- Bobby Kimball (born 1947), American singer
- Ralph Klein (1942–2013), former premier of Alberta, Canada
- Kevin Moore (1958–2013), English footballer
- Ernie Moss (1949–2021), English footballer
- Nic Potter (1951–2013), British bassist for Van der Graaf Generator
- Christina Ramberg (1946–1995), American painter associated with the Chicago Imagists
- David Rumelhart (1942–2011), American cognitive psychologist
- Björn Skifs (born 1947), Swedish musician and songwriter
- Sir Nicholas Wall (1945–2017), English judge
- Darrell Waltrip (born 1947), American race car driver and NASCAR commentator
- Bruce Willis (born 1955), American actor
- Mark Wirtz (1943–2020), French pop musician, composer and producer

== See also ==
- Alcoholic dementia
- Lewy body dementia
- Logopenic progressive aphasia
- Mini-SEA
- Proteopathy
- Transportin 1
- Vascular dementia
