= Elizabeth Warrington =

British neurologist

- Born: 1931 (age 94–95)
- Education: University College London
- Scientific career
- Fields: Neuropsychology
- Workplaces: National Hospital for Neurology and Neurosurgery

Elizabeth Kerr Warrington FRS (born 1931) is a British neuropsychologist specialised in the study of dementia. She holds a PhD in Psychology visual processing and is now an emeritus professor of clinical neuropsychology at the University College London. She formerly worked as the Head of the Department of Neuropsychology at the National Hospital for Neurology and Neurosurgery where she is also a member of the Dementia Research Centre. She was made a Fellow of the Royal Society in 1986.

== Early life and education ==
Elizabeth Warrington received her PhD in psychology (visual processing) from the University College London in the 1950s.

== Career ==
She worked as the Head of Department of Neuropsychology at the National Hospital for Neurology and Neurosurgery in London, England. As of June 2015, she is an emeritus professor of clinical neuropsychology at the University College London, specifically in the UCL Institute of Neurology.

She is a member of the Dementia Research Centre associated with University College London.

Warrington played a key role in the British development of Cognitive Neuropsychology a research approach that has had implications beyond the clinical sphere, providing important insights into the way that the normal human brain perceives, remembers, and talk about words, objects and events. Warrington's work has established a number of important differences (dissociations) between superficially similar cognitive abilities, for example in defining the differences between episodic memory and semantic memory and in establishing the evidence for category specific disorders of semantic knowledge; her work also defined a pattern of clinical impairment that became recognised as defining a form of dementia semantic dementia. Her work is a foundation for understanding normal function as well as for innovating clinical methods in the development of numerous tests that can be used in the diagnosis of brain injuries and diseases including dementia, Alzheimer's disease, and brain injuries resulting from a stroke and tumours. Her tests may also be used to track recovery and to plan rehabilitation.

=== Research ===
Warrington's research work focused on cognitive abilities and deficits. She conducted extensive research in the areas of visual object recognition, memory, and dementia. Her research has played an important role in the discovery and characterisation of semantic dementia. She also contributed to the development of more accurate tests used to diagnose degenerative brain conditions.

In one of Warrington's earliest studies, she investigated eighty right-handed patients who showed signs of a unilateral cerebral lesion resulting from problems such as a stroke or tumor. Subjects with lesions affecting the right side of their brain performed worse than subjects with lesions on the left and control subjects when attempting both the Incomplete Letters Task and the Gollin figure test. She went on to demonstrate that people with right hemisphere lesions had great difficulty in recognising objects photographed from unusual angles or with unusual lighting. The results of these studies provided evidence of hemispheric lateralisation of function and also had a major impact on David Marr's theory of object recognition.

Entirely by accident, Warrington working together with Lawrence Weiskrantz discovered a task in which patients with severe amnesia displayed signs of memory. She accomplished this using the Gollin figure test. When presenting patients with the second viewing of the figures, patients showed good retention of the initially unrecognisable images. These patients were classified as displaying signs of "normal" memory.

To further validate the discovery of "normal" memory in severe amnesics, Warrington used methods involving stem completion. The stem completion tasks involved patients learning a battery of words, and later identifying the learned words. Patients were able to identify a previously learned word when presented with the first three letters, but were unable to identify a previously learned word when given the choice between a learned word and unknown word. These tests provided further evidence of different types of memory, now known as implicit memory and explicit memory.

In a test administered by Warrington and Tim Shallice from University College London, the short-term memory of a patient who had head trauma following a motorcycle accident was tested. Although the patient displayed a digit span of one (as opposed to the average person's digit span of five to nine), he was able to form certain types of long-term memory. The collected data suggested that short-term memory was not necessarily required for the formation of long-term memories.

=== Cognitive Functioning Tests ===
Throughout her career, Warrington conducted many ground breaking experiments and developed many cognitive functioning tests to measure a patient's cognitive abilities. Warrington's work is often credited with helping shape the basis of modern-day cognitive psychology. Many of Warrington's tests are still used today.

One of her most influential collection of tests is the Visual Object and Space Perception Battery, or the VOSP, published by Warrington and Merle James in 1991. This collection of tests was based on over twenty years' research into object and spatial perception in people with damage confined to one side of the brain. Although the tests were originally devised to investigate theoretical issues, they have excellent selectivity and sensitivity in a clinical context leading to their wide adoption. The VOSP tests were designed to place limited demands on other cognitive abilities and are generally easy for people without brain disorders. Some VOSP tests have been incorporated into other test batteries (e.g., The Rookwood Driving Battery) and they have also influenced other screening measures (e.g., The ACE-R). There are eight untimed tests in the VOSP that can be given either separately or as a whole. The scores obtained in a testing session can be compared with those obtained by people with brain injuries and with controls. The VOSP is widely used by clinical and research psychologists and has featured in over 250 research publications. The VOSP can be purchased from Pearson for around the price of US $230.00.

Another test that is still in use is the Verbal and Spatial Reasoning Test also known as VESPAR. VESPAR is a test that was designed by Warrington and Dawn W. Langdon in 1996. VESPAR is a reasoning test that presents a fairly new approach in how reasoning tests are performed. This test is designed to measure the fluid intelligence in neurological patients. This test is unique in that it offers more accuracy than any other test available for this type of measurement. VESPAR is divided into six sections. There are three matched sets of verbal and spatial reasoning problems, where each is dedicated to one of three forms of inductive reasoning. This includes odd one out, by analogy, and series completion. VESPAR is able to overcome many restraints that arise when performing more conventional reasoning tests by using stimuli that is more readily accessed by patients with physical or cognitive impairments due to neurological illness. VESPAR does not use timing to help evaluate performance, instead it uses high frequency stimulus words or visually distinct spatial stimuli to help determine its results. VESPAR has a multiple choice format. This format has been adopted to reduce both short-term memory load and output demands on the patient. The assessment of patients for neurodiagnostic and neurorehabilitation needs will be facilitated. VESPAR only requires the patient to do simple pointing gestures. The spatial section of the test measures the fluid intelligence of patients with aphasia. The verbal section does the same for patients with visual and spatial problems. VESPAR focuses more the instinctive ability of a patient, rather than educational experience. Thus, although originally developed for adult neurological populations, the test is suitable for a wide range of clinical, educational, occupational, and research applications. This test is also available for purchase at most online bookstores.

== Awards ==
Elizabeth has been a recipient of many awards. These include honorary doctorates from the University of Bologna in 1998 and the University of York in 1999.

The British Neuropsychological Society also named their early-career research award the Elizabeth Warrington Prize after her.
