= Primary progressive aphasia =

Gradual impairment of language processing capabilities

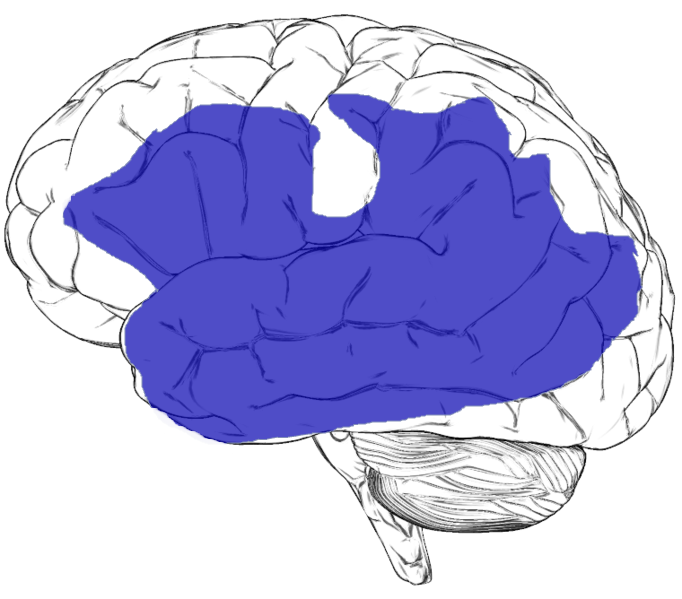
- Regions of the left hemisphere that can give rise to aphasia when damaged.
- Specialty: Neurology

In neurology, primary progressive aphasia (PPA) is a type of neurological syndrome in which language capabilities slowly and progressively become impaired. As with other types of aphasia, the symptoms that accompany PPA depend on what parts of the brain's left hemisphere are significantly damaged. However, unlike most other aphasias, PPA results from continuous deterioration in brain tissue, which leads to early symptoms being far less detrimental than later symptoms.

Those with PPA slowly lose the ability to speak, write, read, and generally comprehend language. Eventually, almost every patient becomes mute and completely loses the ability to understand both written and spoken language. Although it was first described as solely impairment of language capabilities while other mental functions remain intact, it is now recognized that many, if not most of those with PPA experience impairment of memory, short-term memory formation and loss of executive functions.

It was first described as a distinct syndrome by M. Marsel Mesulam in 1982. PPAs have a clinical and pathological overlap with the frontotemporal lobar degeneration spectrum of disorders and Alzheimer's disease. Unlike those affected by Alzheimer's, people with PPA are generally able to maintain self-sufficiency.

== Causes ==
Currently, the specific causes for PPA and other degenerative brain disease similar to PPA are viewed as idiopathic (unknown). Autopsies have revealed a variety of brain abnormalities in people who had PPA. These autopsies, as well as imaging techniques such as CT scans, MRI, EEG, single photon emission computed tomography, and positron emission tomography, have generally revealed abnormalities to be almost exclusively in the left hemisphere.

== Risk factors ==
There have been no large epidemiological studies on the incidence and prevalence of the PPA variants. Though it most likely has been underestimated, onset of PPA has been found to occur in the sixth or seventh decade.

There are no known environmental risk factors for the progressive aphasias. However, one observational, retrospective study suggested that vasectomy could be a risk factor for PPA in men. These results have yet to be replicated or demonstrated by prospective studies.

PPA is not considered a hereditary disease. However, relatives of a person with any form of frontotemporal lobar degeneration (FTLD), including PPA, are at slightly greater risk of developing PPA or another form of the condition. In a quarter of patients diagnosed with PPA, there is a family history of PPA or one of the other disorders in the FTLD spectrum of disorders. It has been found that genetic predisposition varies among the different PPA variants, with progressive nonfluent aphasia (PNFA) being more commonly familial in nature than semantic dementia (SD).

The most convincing genetic basis of PPA has been found to be a mutation in the GRN gene. Most patients with observed GRN mutations present clinical features of PNFA, but the phenotype can be atypical.

== Diagnosis ==
=== Diagnostic criteria ===
The following diagnosis criteria were defined by Mesulam:

- As opposed to having followed trauma to the brain, a patient must show an insidious onset and a gradual progression of aphasia, defined as a disorder of sentence and/or word usage, affecting the production and comprehension of speech.
- The disorder in question must be the only determinant on functional impairment in the activities of the patient's daily living.
- On the basis of diagnostic procedures, the disorder in question must be unequivocally attributed to a neurodegenerative process.

Whether or not PPA and other aphasias are the only source of cognitive impairment in a patient is often difficult to assess because: 1) as with other neurologically degenerative diseases, such as Alzheimer's disease, there are currently no reliable non-invasive diagnostic tests for aphasias, and thus neuropsychological assessments are the only tool physicians have for diagnosing patients; and 2) aphasias often affect other, non-language portions of these neuropsychological tests, such as those specific for memory.

=== Classification ===
In 2011, the classification of primary progressive aphasia was updated to include three clinical variants. Patients must first be diagnosed with PPA, and then divided into variants based on speech production features, repetition, single-word and syntax comprehension, confrontation naming, semantic knowledge, and reading/spelling. In the classical Mesulam criteria for primary progressive aphasia, there are two variants: a non-fluent type PNFA and a fluent type SD.

A third variant of primary progressive aphasia, LPA was then added, and is an atypical form of Alzheimer's disease. For PNFA, the core criteria for diagnosis include agrammatism and slow and labored speech. Inconsistent speech sound errors are also very common, including distortions, deletions, and insertions. In terms of comprehension, there are deficits in syntax and sentence comprehension due to grammatical complexity, but single-word and object comprehension is relatively maintained.

The second variant, SD, presents with deficits in single-word and object comprehension. Naming impairments can be severe, specially for low-frequency objects, and can eventually lead to a more widespread semantic memory deficiency over time. The ability to read and write can also be impaired if there are irregularities between pronunciation and spelling. However, repetition and motor speech is relatively preserved.

The logopenic variant involves impairments in word retrieval, sentence repetition, and phonological paraphasias, comparable to conduction aphasia. Compared to the semantic variant, single-word comprehension and naming is spared, however, sentence comprehension presents difficulty because of length and grammatical complexity. Speech will include incomplete words, hesitations preceding content words, and repetition. However, these PPA subtypes differ from similar aphasias, as these subtypes do not occur acutely following trauma to the brain, such as following a stroke, due to differing functional and structural neuroanatomical patterns of involvement and the progressive nature of the disease.

Unlike those affected by Alzheimer's, people with PPA can generally maintain the ability to care for themselves, remain employed, and pursue interests and hobbies. Moreover, in diseases such as Alzheimer's disease, Pick's disease, and Creutzfeldt–Jakob disease, progressive deterioration of comprehension and production of language is just one of the many possible types of mental deterioration, such as the progressive decline of memory, motor skills, reasoning, awareness, and visuospatial skills.

== Treatment ==
Due to the progressive, continuous nature of the disease, improvement over time seldom occurs in patients with PPA as it often does in patients with aphasias caused by trauma to the brain.

In terms of medical approaches to treating PPA, there are currently no drugs specifically used for patients with PPA, nor are there any specifically designed interventions for PPA. A large reason for this is the limited research that has been done on this disease. However, in some cases, patients with PPA are prescribed the same drugs Alzheimer's patients are normally prescribed.

The primary approach to treating PPA has been with behavioral treatment, with the hope that these methods can provide new ways for patients to communicate in order to compensate for their deteriorated abilities. Speech therapy can assist an individual with strategies to overcome difficulties. There are three very broad categories of therapy interventions for aphasia: restorative therapy approaches, compensatory therapy approaches, and social therapy approaches. Examples include word retrieval therapy and script training, communication partner training and group therapy.

Rapid and sustained improvement in speech and dementia in a patient with primary progressive aphasia utilizing off-label perispinal etanercept, an anti-TNF treatment strategy also used for Alzheimer's, has been reported. A video depicting the patient's improvement was published in conjunction with the print article. These findings have not been independently replicated and remain controversial.

== History ==
M. Marsel Mesulam coined the term primary progressive aphasia.

== See also ==
- Anomic aphasia
- Aphasiology
- Apraxia of speech
- Speech-language pathology
- Speech disorder
- Transcortical sensory aphasia
