= Aphasiology (journal) =

- Discipline: Aphasiology
- Language: English

Publication details
- History: 1987–present
- Publisher: Routledge
- Frequency: Monthly
- Impact factor: 1.5 (2023)

Standard abbreviations
- ISO 4: Aphasiology

Indexing
- ISSN: 0268-7038 (print); 1464-5041 (web)
- LCCN: 90641006
- OCLC no.: 14814735

Links
- Journal homepage; Online access; Online archive

Aphasiology is a monthly medical journal covering the field of aphasias, covering all aspects of language impairment and disability and related disorders resulting from brain damage. According to the Journal Citation Reports, the journal has a 2023 impact factor of 1.5.
