= RG/RGG motif =

RG/RGG sequence motiff

The arginine-glycine or arginine-glycine-glycine (RG/RGG) motif is a repeating amino acid sequence motif commonly found in RNA-binding proteins (RBPs). RGG regions in proteins are defined as two or more RG/RGG sequences within a stretch of 30 amino acids. Initially named the RGG box, it confers a protein with the ability to bind double-stranded mRNA molecules. The RGG motif has been observed in proteins from at least 12 animal species, including humans.

== Biochemical function ==
RGG motifs are primarily involved in mediating protein-RNA interactions. Positive charges from arginine residues promote electrostatic interactions with mRNA molecules. The composition and structure of the arginine side chain may also allow for specific interactions with other molecules as opposed to the other positively charged amino acids, lysine and histidine. Glycine residues add flexibility to the peptide structure and promote their tendency to form intrinsically disordered regions. The RGG motif can also drive liquid-lipid phase separation of proteins inside cells as well as in vitro.

== Synthetic uses ==
Researchers have pursued creating condensates with novel functions for use in cellular and metabolic engineering. Synthetically designed proteins containing repeating RGG motifs have been used to form droplets with tunable properties in cells and in vitro.

== Notable RGG-containing proteins ==
RGG motif-containing proteins are the second most abundant group of RBPs in the human genome. They are involved in various RNA metabolism, export, and translation functions.

- Sbp1
- Npl3
- Ded1
- FMR1
- FUS
- Laf-1
