= Association for Frontotemporal Degeneration =

Nonprofit organization based in King of Prussia

- Founder: Helen-Ann Comstock
- Tax ID no.: 41-2073220
- Purpose: AFTD envisions a world with compassionate care, effective support, and a future free of FTD
- Location: King of Prussia
- Services: Education, advocacy, helpline, research, funding
- Key people: Susan L-J Dickinson, Mitch Appleson, Penny Dacks, Sharon S Denny, Phillip Weichel
- Revenue: $13,139,120
- Employees: 47
- Volunteers: 398
- Formerly called: Association for Frontotemporal Dementias

The Association for Frontotemporal Degeneration (AFTD) is a nonprofit organization based in King of Prussia, Pennsylvania, that works to support research on frontotemporal degeneration (FTD) while providing support and educational resources to people living with FTD disorders, their families, and medical professionals.

== History ==
AFTD was founded in 2002 by Helen-Ann Comstock with assistance from caregivers and family members of people with FTD. In the 1970s, Comstock’s husband Craig was diagnosed with Alzheimer’s disease; however, a doctor later told Comstock that they believed he had Pick’s disease, an early term for FTD. Craig died in 1985 at the age of 50 from complications of his diagnosis.

In 1999, Comstock worked with Lisa Radin, whose husband was diagnosed with FTD at 55, and members of a support group the two founded to hold the first conference for Pick’s disease in the United States. Comstock met many people at the conference who later became inaugural AFTD board members. In 2000, at a consensus criteria meeting held by the National Institutes of Health (NIH), Dr. Jordan Grafman of the NIH noted to Comstock the interest in a national patient-advocacy organization for Pick’s disease, and recommended she found one.

In the ensuing months, Comstock began reaching out to families affected by FTD to gather support for the organization. Additionally, Comstock recruited prominent FTD researchers to serve as medical advisors for the organization. In 2002, Comstock opened the organization’s bank account and donated $1,000 of her money. In 2003, at the initial meeting of the board of directors, the organization was named the Association for Frontotemporal Dementias, and all inaugural board members donated to the organization to establish its first funding. The name was later changed to the Association for Frontotemporal Degeneration to better reflect the modern understanding of FTD. The AFTD Medical Advisory Council was founded in 2004 with Dr. Grafman as an initial member. In 2005, the AFTD HelpLine was launched to provide resources and information to people living with FTD. Initially staffed by volunteers, the HelpLine is now staffed by licensed social workers. To directly assist families, in 2009 AFTD founded the Comstock Grant Program, which provides financial assistance to people living with FTD and their caregivers. The following year, the organization held its first conference to gather caregivers, medical professionals, and researchers to share updates in research and new resources.

In 2017, AFTD and the Bluefield Project to Cure FTD co-founded the FTD Disorders Registry, a digital platform that collects data provided by people living with FTD, caregivers, and family members and makes it accessible to researchers. In 2020, AFTD chartered its Persons with FTD Advisory Council, providing a platform for people living with FTD to help shape the organization’s mission by sharing their experiences and insight.

In 2022, the organization hosted the inaugural Holloway Summit, an annual scientific conference that gathers academic and industry researchers, medical professionals, and people living with FTD to discuss specific topics in FTD research. The Holloway Summit was started with support from the Holloway Family Fund founded by AFTD Board member Kristin Holloway, whose husband Lee Holloway, co-founder of Cloudflare, was diagnosed with FTD while she was pregnant with their child.

On February 16, 2023, Bruce Willis' FTD diagnosis was announced in a letter signed by Demi Moore, Emma Heming Willis, and Rumer, Scout, Tallulah, Mabel, and Evelyn Willis. The letter was published in partnership with AFTD and appeared on the organization’s website. It had been announced previously that the actor was stepping back from film after being diagnosed with a form of aphasia. Emma Heming Willis has continued to work with AFTD to advocate for awareness of FTD, and is set to accept the Susan Newhouse & Si Newhouse Award of Hope from the AFTD in 2026 for her work.

== Research Activities ==
AFTD invests significantly in programs supporting academic and industry researchers in the FTD space.

=== Pilot and Biomarker Grants ===
The AFTD Pilot Grant program provides funding for early-career researchers, with some support provided to more experienced scientists. The Pathways for Hope program provides grants to early-career scientists conducting basic research or studying the neurological and biological mechanisms underlying FTD. The Well-Being in FTD program supports early and senior researchers whose projects focus on improving the lives of people with FTD, their families, and caregivers.

=== Research Partnerships ===
AFTD has extensive partnerships with other organizations in the neurodegenerative disease space to advance research for FTD and related disorders.

With support from the Holloway Family Fund, AFTD, the American Academy of Neurology, and the American Brain Foundation offer funding to early-career researchers through the Holloway Postdoctoral Fellowship and Clinical Research Training Scholarship programs. The Postdoctoral Fellowship primarily supports younger scientists in a postdoctoral position with a project focusing mainly on FTD. The scholarship, meanwhile, supports clinician scientists focused on person-centered research or translational research advancing FTD diagnosis.

In partnership with the Alzheimer’s Drug Discovery Foundation (ADDF), AFTD promotes small molecule and biologic drug discovery research through the Accelerating Drug Discovery for FTD program. AFTD and ADDF also work together to support clinical trials addressing the challenges of treatment development through the Treat FTD Fund, which is funded through 2035. AFTD was also involved with ADDF’s Diagnostic Accelerator program, which no longer accepts unsolicited applications.

Between 2016 and 2021, AFTD disbursed $5 million in funds through the FTD Biomarkers Initiative with the support of the Samuel I. Newhouse Foundation to drive the development of usable biomarkers. In 2025, the FTD Biomarkers Initiative was relaunched in partnership with the Alzheimer’s Association, Holloway Family Fund, and Bluefield Project to Cure FTD. In 2020, AFTD and Target ALS distributed $5 million in grants for six projects researching biomarkers and viable treatments for ALS and FTD. In 2023, through the Digital Assessment Tools for FTD and ALS program, AFTD and the ALS Association awarded funding to researchers studying diagnostic digital health technologies for FTD and ALS.

=== Annual Research Meetings ===
As part of its research program, AFTD hosts a number of annual meetings that convene researchers studying FTD, people affected by FTD, and healthcare professionals to share updates on FTD science and promote networking between stakeholders in the FTD space.

In 2011, AFTD convened the first meeting of the FTD Treatment Study Group, which created a space for biopharmaceutical companies to collaborate on treatment development. In 2023, the program was renamed the FTD Research Roundtable. AFTD hosted its first Holloway Summit in 2022. This summit convenes academic and industry researchers, patient-advocacy and health nonprofit organizations, and people with lived experience of FTD to discuss rotating topics on FTD research.

=== FTD Disorders Registry ===
In March 2015, AFTD and the Bluefield Project to Cure FTD founded the FTD Disorders Registry as a platform to enable the sharing of data and to promote participation in research by families affected by FTD. Since its public launch in March 2017, the Registry has worked with researchers to promote clinical trials to eligible candidates and administers surveys to collect data on the lived experiences of FTD. In 2024, the platform underwent a technical overhaul, relaunching with new capabilities and an updated research protocol.

== Programs and Services ==
AFTD operates a variety of programs to support people affected by FTD, spread awareness of FTD disorders, and educate people about different aspects of FTD.

=== AFTD HelpLine ===
The AFTD HelpLine is staffed by social workers with experience in FTD disorders and their symptoms, treatment options, clinical trial participation, and legal and financial planning. It can be reached by phone or email, though the organization's website also offers the option to schedule a call.

=== Comstock Grant Program ===
The AFTD Comstock Grant program provides financial support to people diagnosed with FTD and caregivers to help alleviate some of the financial burden common among affected families. Respite grants offer funds for caregivers to seek mental and physical health services to support their well-being. Quality of Life grants help people with FTD by providing funds to obtain services to improve their quality of life.

=== Diagnostic Checklists and Other Support Materials ===
On its website, AFTD offers diagnostic checklists for FTD disorders to aid in the diagnostic process and to help people determine if the symptoms they are experiencing are related to FTD. The front side of the checklists present diagnostic criteria developed by researchers and clinicians in a lay-friendly format for families affected by FTD. The opposite side provides a physician with the full diagnostic criteria and relevant information, such as ICD-10 codes for FTD disorders.

AFTD produces various educational materials and resources digitally and in print. The organization’s website has pages offering guidance on symptom management, legal and financial planning, and navigating disease progression as a diagnosed person, caregiver, or family member. The website also features a tool for locating medical centers specializing in FTD and support groups.

=== Annual Education Conference ===
The AFTD Annual Education Conference is the organization’s largest yearly event, bringing together healthcare and research professionals with people affected by FTD. The conference promotes networking between attendees to share the lived experience of FTD with professionals, and to educate affected families on new care strategies and research updates. In the aftermath of the COVID-19 pandemic, the conference has been held both in person and virtually via livestream.

=== Webinars ===
AFTD regularly produces webinars that feature discussions with experts on specific FTD topics, including in-depth explanations of specific FTD disorders and updates on recent discoveries. In partnership with Rush University, AFTD also hosts educational webinars that offer continuing education credits for healthcare professionals.

=== Advocacy ===
With the assistance of volunteers, including people living with FTD, caregivers, and family members of those diagnosed, AFTD works to spread awareness of FTD among U.S. policymakers. Volunteers working with advocacy staff at AFTD have secured dozens of FTD awareness resolutions and proclamations at the state and local levels. New York State Senator Michelle Hinchey has worked closely with AFTD to promote FTD legislation in her home state. Hinchey’s father, the late U.S. Representative Maurice Hinchey, was diagnosed with FTD. Hinchey cited her father’s work to help others as a motivation to campaign for FTD awareness. Hinchey introduced and sponsored a bill in the New York Senate to create a state registry of FTD diagnoses; AFTD has helped promote the bill as a first step to advocating for a national-level registry in the United States.
