= RGPD5 =

Protein-coding gene in the species Homo sapiens

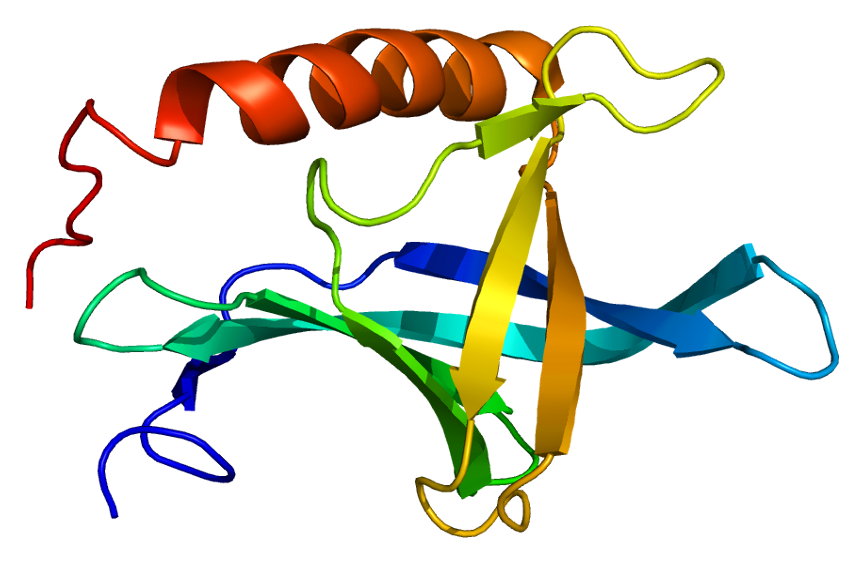

Identifiers
- Aliases: RGPD5, BS-63, BS63, HEL161, RGP5, RANBP2-like and GRIP domain containing 5, RANBP2 like and GRIP domain containing 5
- External IDs: OMIM: 612708; MGI: 894323; GeneCards: RGPD5

Gene location (Human)
Chr.	Chromosome 2 (human)
Band	2q13	Start	109,792,758 bp
Band	2q13	End	109,857,705 bp

Gene location (Mouse)
Chr.	Chromosome 10 (mouse)
Band	10 B4|10 29.34 cM	Start	58,282,742 bp
Band	10 B4|10 29.34 cM	End	58,330,178 bp
RNA expression pattern
Bgee	Human / Mouse (ortholog); Top expressed in: Achilles tendon; buccal mucosa cell; sural nerve; trachea; testicle; nipple; pylorus; muscle of thigh; bone marrow cell; superior surface of tongue / Top expressed in: human fetus; Gonadal ridge; lobe of cerebellum; lacrimal gland; cerebellar vermis; spermatocyte; spermatid; left lung lobe; primitive streak; pineal gland; More reference expression data
BioGPS	n/a
Gene ontology
Molecular function	GTPase activator activity
Cellular component	cytoplasm; nucleus; nuclear pore; centrosome
Biological process	intracellular transport; NLS-bearing protein import into nucleus; positive regulation of GTPase activity
Sources:Amigo / QuickGO
Orthologs
Databases	NCBI: entry; OMA: entry
Species	Human	Mouse
Entrez	84220	19386
Ensembl	ENSG00000015568	ENSMUSG00000003226
UniProt	Q99666	Q9ERU9
RefSeq (mRNA)	NM_005054; NM_032260	NM_011240
RefSeq (protein)	NP_005045; NP_115636	NP_035370
Location (UCSC)	Chr 2: 109.79 – 109.86 Mb	Chr 10: 58.28 – 58.33 Mb
PubMed search
- Wikidata
View/Edit Human	View/Edit Mouse

RANBP2-like and GRIP domain-containing protein 5 is a protein that in humans is encoded by the RGPD5 gene.

RAN is a small GTP-binding protein of the RAS superfamily that is associated with the nuclear membrane and is thought to control a variety of cellular functions through its interactions with other proteins. This gene shares a high degree of sequence identity with RANBP2, a large RAN-binding protein localized at the cytoplasmic side of the nuclear pore complex. It is believed that this RANBP2 gene family member arose from a duplication event 3 Mb distal to RANBP2. Alternative splicing has been observed for this locus and two variants are described. Additional splicing is suggested but complete sequence for further transcripts has not been determined.

== Interactions ==
RGPD5 has been shown to interact with Transportin 1.
