= Gollin figure test =

Psychological test

Gollin figures test
- Purpose: assess someone's visual perception

The Gollin figures test is a psychological test used to assess someone's visual perception. Subjects are shown pictures of common objects: namely five consecutive incomplete line drawings for each picture, from least to most complete, that the subjects need to mentally complete to identify the object drawn. On a retention test sometime later, however, subjects identify the image sooner than they did on the first test, indicating some form of memory for the image. Amnesiac subjects also show improvement on this test, even though they do not recall taking the test before.

== Original test ==
In 1960, Eugene S. Gollin investigated the level of completeness that people need to recognize incomplete images and studied how training can change this threshold. For the test he selected common objects known by kindergarten children.

=== Methods ===
Gollin conducted four experiments.

In experiment I, 53 children aged 30–65 months and a comparison group of 20 adults were recruited. The test consisted in a series of 11 objects [bell, bird, birthday cake, chair, cow, fish, goose, horse, table (viewed from above and from below), umbrella] each drawn five times (set I, II, III, IV and V) with black ink on a white 14 in × 9 in (360 mm × 230 mm) card and every time with a different level of completeness. The children were shown each image for 3 seconds, starting from the less complete and subsequently increasing the level of completeness.

Experiment II was conducted to investigate how training, in 22 nursery children and in 7 other control group children, could decrease the threshold of completeness needed to recognize the objects, which were now increased to 20. In the first week of the experiment, all subjects were exposed to a recognition test (like in experiment I) of the 20 objects; then, during the second week only the 22 experimental children were exposed to the complete images of 10 objects that they had to name. Lastly, in the third week everything was repeated as in week one.

In experiment III, only the first set (set I) of every card was shown to 9 children and 18 adults to investigate how many of the 20 cards were recognized.

In experiments IVa and IVb, 40 children and 24 adults were trained (like in experiment II) either with set III or with set V and later had to recognize set I objects.

=== Findings ===
In all experiments, scores were calculated by adding the number of the set when each image was recognized, so low scores were associated with less time taken to identify the objects and higher scores with more time.

In experiment I, only five children did not succeed in performing the task. There was a negative and statistically significant correlation between children's age and their average recognition time: older children needed less time to recognize the objects, and there was no significant difference between the average recognition time of adults and that of the older children.

In experiment II, during the first week, there was no significant difference between the control group and the experimental group, while in the last week both groups improved significantly, taking less time to recognize the objects. However, with the 10 objects on which they trained, the experimental group did much better than with the 10 objects on which they did not train and than the control group. Thus, merely repeating the task increases the performance but training is needed for a higher increase.

In experiments III, IVa and IVb, training to recognize the first set of objects was more efficient when using the third set of intermediate completeness rather than the last set with the completed picture, because the effort to recognize the third set and its level of completeness were closer to the first set than the last one.

== Computerised version ==
In an article published in 1987 by Foreman and Hemmings, incomplete common objects images were presented on a computer and participants pressed the space bar to reveal more details of the image and once they recognised the object they released the space bar or informed the researcher. This seems a valid alternative to the original test, since Gollin's findings were successfully replicated and, although more expensive, with its accuracy it eliminates the need for large samples and exposure to many stimuli. Additionally, it creates the possibility of more gradual changes, around 420 levels compared to the original five, which are useful to understand the exact moment and details needed to recognize the object. With some improvements, the computerised version could also be self-administered to participants with a functioning motor system.

== Theory ==
Gestalt psychology first investigated how we perceive incomplete figures and argued that we tend to add the missing parts and perceive the object as a whole rather than the sum of its parts. Specifically, the Gollin figures test is an example of the law of closure which indicates our tendency to see incomplete images as completed, by filling in the gaps.

== Clinical uses ==
=== Visual perception and impediments ===
The test has been used to assess visual perception in a group of healthy young adults and elderly: the latter needed more time and a higher level of completeness to recognise the objects, but there were overlaps between the two groups in terms of results.

The task, being simple, was also used to assess Alzheimer and demented patients’ visual perception and impairments, which are often worse than in healthy elderly.

=== Visual agnosia ===
Since the ability to recognize and identify figures is often lost in patients with visual agnosia, the test is also employed as a method to identify visual agnosia.

=== Cerebral lesions ===
Some evidence suggests that the test might be used to differentiate between patients with left or right hemisphere brain damage, since participants with damages to the right hemisphere scored significantly worse than participants with left hemisphere injuries, although these findings have not always been replicated. An intact parietal cortex in the right hemisphere seems crucial to complete the test, because patients with right parietal injuries performed significantly worse than patients with other right hemisphere damages and with left parietal damages.

=== Priming, implicit perceptual learning and memory ===
The test has been used in people with alcohol-induced Korsakoff syndrome to assess: (i) visuoperceptual ability, using the scores of the first trial; (ii) implicit memory (visuoperceptual learning), using the scores of the repeated trials; and (iii) explicit memory, when recalling the names of the objects of the first trial. The test was also used to assess priming in patients with Alzheimer or vascular dementia.

== Comparison with other visual closure tests ==
No correlation has been found between the computerised version of the Gollin figures test and the Mooney Face Test, so the two seem to use different perceptual processes. However, a small but significant correlation has been found with the Poppelreuter overlapping figures test, probably because Poppelerauter's objects and Gollin's background of the image act as masks: thus, in order to be recognised, the object has to be extracted from the mask.
