= Transportin 1 =

Protein-coding gene in the species Homo sapiens

TNPO1
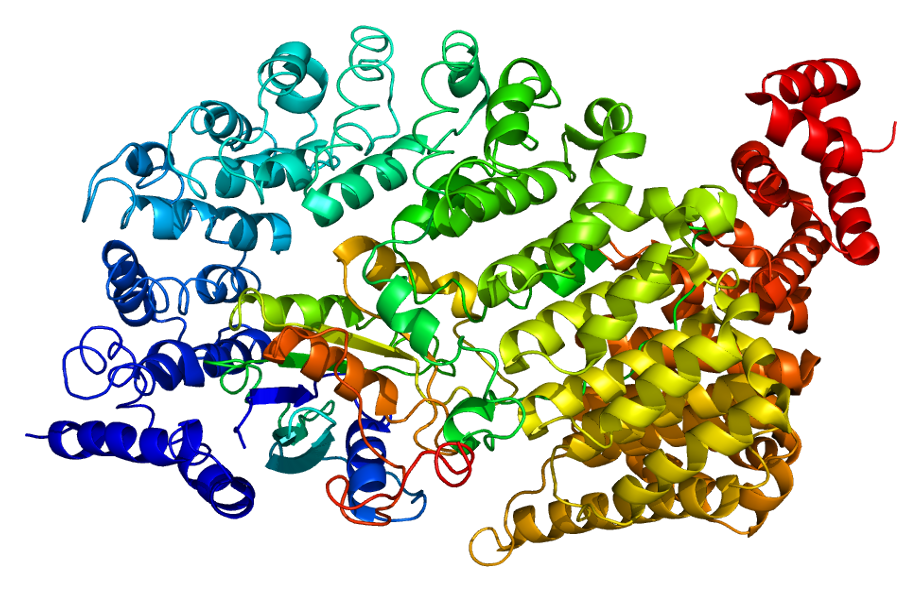

Identifiers
- Aliases: TNPO1, IPO2, KPNB2, MIP, MIP1, TRN, Transportin 1
- External IDs: OMIM: 602901; MGI: 2681523; GeneCards: TNPO1
Available structures
| PDB | Ortholog search: PDBe RCSB |
| PDB | List of PDB id codes 1QBK, 2H4M, 2OT8, 2QMR, 2Z5J, 2Z5K, 2Z5M, 2Z5N, 2Z5O, 4FDD, 4FQ3, 4JLQ, 4OO6 |

Gene location (Human)
| Chr. | Chromosome 5 (human) |
| Band | 5q13.2 | Start | 72,816,312 bp |
| Band | 5q13.2 | End | 72,916,733 bp |

Gene location (Mouse)
| Chr. | Chromosome 13 (mouse) |
| Band | 13 D1|13 52.24 cM | Start | 98,975,527 bp |
| Band | 13 D1|13 52.24 cM | End | 99,062,892 bp |
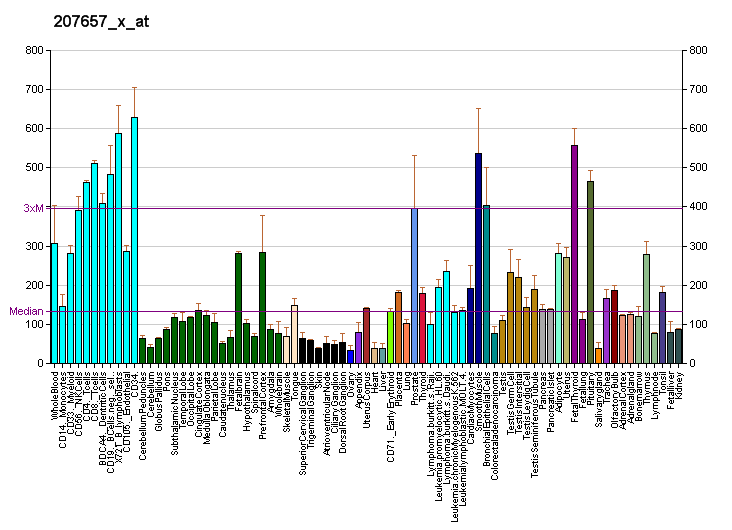

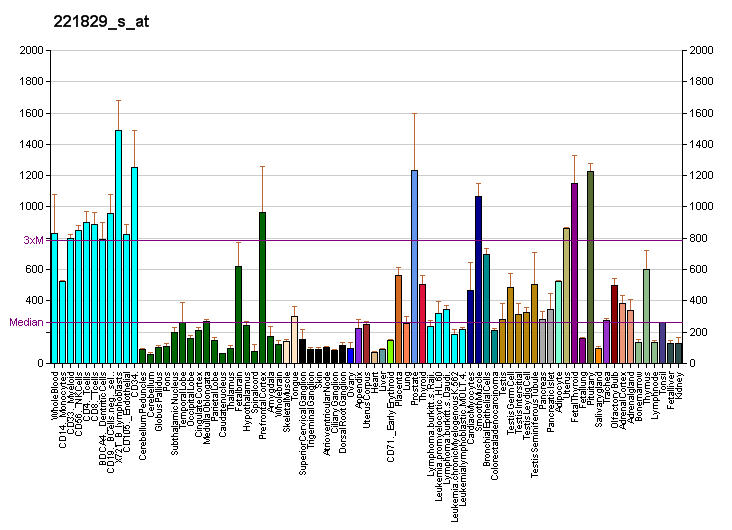

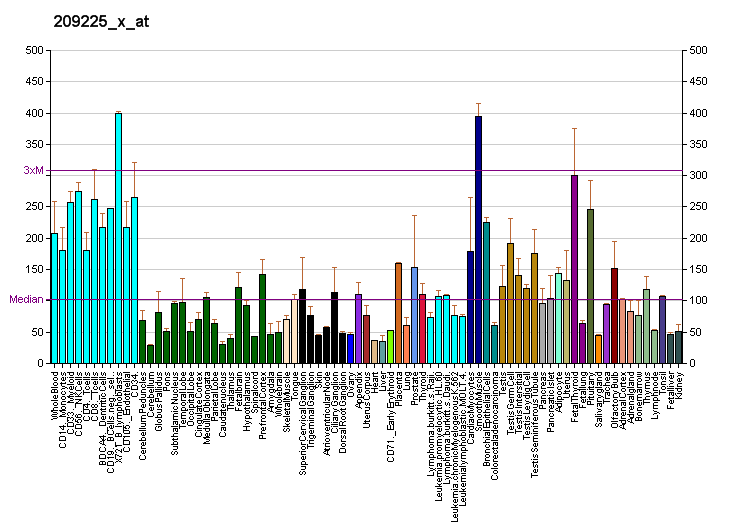
RNA expression pattern
| Bgee | Human / Mouse (ortholog); Top expressed in: corpus epididymis; tail of epididymis; caput epididymis; pylorus; secondary oocyte; optic nerve; cardia; renal medulla; pericardium; nipple / Top expressed in: genital tubercle; pineal gland; zygote; tail of embryo; secondary oocyte; cumulus cell; Gonadal ridge; abdominal wall; retina; primitive streak; More reference expression data |
| BioGPS | More reference expression data |
Gene ontology
| Molecular function | protein binding; nuclear localization sequence binding; RNA binding |
| Cellular component | cytoplasm; cytosol; nuclear membrane; nuclear periphery; extracellular exosome; nucleus; cilium |
| Biological process | ribosomal protein import into nucleus; regulation of mRNA stability; protein transport; viral process; intracellular protein transport; NLS-bearing protein import into nucleus; intraciliary transport involved in cilium assembly; transport; protein import into nucleus |
Sources:Amigo / QuickGO
Orthologs
| Databases | NCBI: entry; OMA: entry |
| Species | Human | Mouse |
| Entrez | 3842 | 238799 |
| Ensembl | ENSG00000083312 | ENSMUSG00000009470 |
| UniProt | Q92973 | Q8BFY9 |
| RefSeq (mRNA) | NM_002270; NM_153188 | NM_001048267; NM_178716 |
| RefSeq (protein) | NP_002261; NP_694858; NP_001351221; NP_001351222; NP_001351223 NP_001351224; NP_001351225 | NP_001041732; NP_848831 |
| Location (UCSC) | Chr 5: 72.82 – 72.92 Mb | Chr 13: 98.98 – 99.06 Mb |
| PubMed search |
- Wikidata
| View/Edit Human | View/Edit Mouse |

Transportin-1 (or Importin-β 2) is a protein that in humans is encoded by the TNPO1 gene.

== Function ==
This protein is a karyopherin which interacts with nuclear localization sequence to target nuclear proteins to the nucleus. The classical karyopherin receptor complex, such as the complex that uses Importin-β1 (encoded by gene KPNB1), is a heterodimer of an alpha subunit which recognizes the nuclear localization signal and a beta subunit which docks the complex at nucleoporins. However, Transportin-1 can directly bind to the cargo proteins and may not need importin alpha subunit to do it.

Transportin-1 is thought to use the same principal mechanism to carry out nuclear transport as other Importins. It mediates docking to the nuclear pore complex through binding to nucleoporin and is subsequently translocated through the pore by an energy requiring mechanism. Then, in the nucleus Ran binds to Transportin-1, it dissociates from cargo, and Transportin-1 is re-exported from the nucleus to the cytoplasm where GTP hydrolysis releases Ran. Then Transportin-1 is free to bind new cargo.

In addition, Transportin-1 is implicated in helping protein transport into primary cilium. The function of Transportin-1 in this case is thought to be similar to carrying proteins into the nucleus through a nuclear pore. Transportin-1 binds cargo and then is helping this cargo to pass through a pore at the base of the cilium. Ran and nucleoporins are also implicated in this mechanism.

Alternate splicing of this gene results in two transcript variants encoding different proteins.

== Targets ==
Transportin 1 (TRN1) is part of the non-classical nuclear import pathway. In conjunction with the RanGTP hydrolysis cascade TRN1 acts to import a selection of proteins into the nucleus of cells. These targets typically contain a PY-motif otherwise known as a M9 nuclear localisation signal. Well described examples include hnRNP A1.

The type of cargo proteins that Transportin 1 can carry into the nucleus include RNA-binding proteins (such as hnRNP A1 and hnRNP F) and also ribosomal proteins.

== Clinical significance ==
TRN1 has been implicated in the pathogenesis of two neurodegenerative diseases namely amyotrophic lateral sclerosis and frontotemporal dementia.

== Interactions ==
Transportin 1 has been shown to interact with:

- RGPD5 and
- Ran (biology).
