= Progressive nonfluent aphasia =

Neurological disorder

Progressive nonfluent aphasia (PNFA) is one of three clinical syndromes associated with frontotemporal lobar degeneration. PNFA has an insidious onset of language deficits over time as opposed to other stroke-based aphasias, which occur acutely following trauma to the brain. The specific degeneration of the frontal and temporal lobes in PNFA creates hallmark language deficits differentiating this disorder from other Alzheimer-type disorders by the initial absence of other cognitive and memory deficits. This disorder commonly has a primary effect on the left hemisphere, causing the symptomatic display of expressive language deficits (production difficulties) and sometimes may disrupt receptive abilities in comprehending grammatically complex language.

== Presentation ==
The main clinical features are signature language progressive difficulties with speech production. There can be problems in different parts of the speech production system, hence patients can present with articulatory breakdown, phonemic breakdown (difficulties with sounds) and other problems. However, it is rare for patients to have just one of these problems and most people will present with more than one problem. Features include:

- Hesitant, effortful speech
- Apraxia of speech
- Stutter (including return of a childhood stutter)
- Anomic aphasia (word retrieval failures)
- Phonemic paraphasia (sound errors in speech e.g. 'gat' for 'cat')
- Agrammatism (using the wrong tense or word order)

As the disease develops, speech quantity decreases and many patients become mute.

Cognitive domains other than language are rarely affected early on. However, as the disease progresses, other domains can be affected. Bowel irritation, problems with writing, reading, and speech comprehension can occur, as can behavioural features similar to frontotemporal dementia.

== Diagnosis ==
Imaging studies have shown differing results which probably represents the heterogeneity of language problems than can occur in PNFA. However, classically atrophy of left perisylvian areas is seen. Comprehensive meta-analyses on MRI and FDG-PET studies identified alterations in the whole left frontotemporal network for phonological and syntactical processing as the most consistent finding. Based on these imaging methods, progressive nonfluent aphasia can be regionally dissociated from the other subtypes of frontotemporal lobar degeneration, frontotemporal dementia and semantic dementia.

=== Classification ===
Some confusion exists in the terminology used by different neurologists. Mesulam's original description in 1982 of progressive language problems caused by neurodegenerative disease (which he called primary progressive aphasia (PPA) included patients with progressive nonfluent (aphasia, semantic dementia, and logopenic progressive aphasia.

== Management ==
No cure or treatment for this condition has been found. Supportive management is helpful.

== See also ==
- Alzheimer's disease
- Corticobasal degeneration
- Pick's disease
