= Social-emotional agnosia =

Lack of ability to perceive body language

Social-emotional agnosia, also known as emotional agnosia or expressive agnosia, is the inability to perceive facial expressions, body language, and voice intonation. A person with this disorder is unable to non-verbally perceive others' emotions in social situations, limiting normal social interactions. The condition causes a functional blindness to subtle non-verbal social-emotional cues in voice, gesture, and facial expression. People with this form of agnosia have difficulty in determining and identifying the motivational and emotional significance of external social events, and may appear emotionless or agnostic (uncertainty or general indecisiveness about a particular thing). Symptoms of this agnosia can vary depending on the area of the brain affected. Social-emotional agnosia often occurs in individuals with schizophrenia and autism. It is difficult to distinguish from, and has been found to co-occur with, alexithymia.

== Presentation ==
Damage to the right temporal occipital region in humans has been associated with the inability to recognize the faces of loved ones, friends, and pets (considered a form of prosopagnosia). This limits the ability to appropriately interact with familiar people, potentially severely damaging interpersonal relationships. People with social-emotional agnosia may distance themselves from interacting with other people and prefer isolation. Maternal behavior is also severely affected, causing mothers to fail to recognize their children as their own. In human children, deficits in imitating and responding to peer social interactions have been observed. Children with this agnosia have also been found to have hyperorality, an increased tendency to investigate objects with their mouths, which is also a common symptom of Klüver–Bucy syndrome.

== Causes ==
Social-emotional agnosia is mainly caused by abnormal functioning in a particular brain area called the amygdala. Typically this agnosia is only found in people with bilateral amygdala damage; that is damage to amygdala regions in both hemispheres of the brain. It can be accompanied by right or bilateral temporal lobe damage. The amygdala dysfunction causes the inability to select appropriate behaviors in a specific social context. Symptoms can include reduced aggression, fearfulness, competitiveness, and social dominance. Those with social-emotional agnosia have difficulty discerning the emotional meaning and significance behind objects, which causes a loss of fondness and familiarity. Bilateral amygdala damage has also been associated with social unresponsiveness, leading to an avoidance of social interactions and a preference for isolation from their own species. Evidence suggests that damage to the amygdala and the limbic system (specifically the amygdala-hypothalamus pathway) results in the loss of the core ability to recognize and interpret the mental states of others, a vital ability in social interactions. The amygdala evokes highly personal emotional memories and the loss of this function causes hypo-emotionality, a general lack of emotion when presented with different stimuli. Hypersexuality has also been observed in those with disconnection in the amygdala-hypothalamus pathway. Temporal lobe epilepsy has been shown to cause bilateral amygdala damage which could result in symptoms similar to social-emotional agnosia, but the precise relationship between the two disorders is unknown.

== Diagnosis ==
=== Classification ===
Social-emotional agnosia is generally diagnosed through the use of two tests, the Faux Pas Test and the Strange Stories Test. Both of these tests are used to show deficits in theory of mind, the recognition of mental states of others. For people with social-emotional agnosia, it is mainly the emotional states that are difficult for them to recognize. Studies have shown that subjects with amygdala damage perform poorly on both the Faux Pas test and the Strange Stories test.

==== Faux Pas test ====
The Faux Pas test measures how socially adept one is in certain situations. For this test, a faux pas is considered a statement or action that accidentally offends another person. During the test, the subject or patient is told of various social situations and later asked if one of the people in the story would be offended in the situation. A person with impaired social skills would have difficulty in detecting the faux pas made by characters in the stories.

==== Strange Stories test ====
The emotional aspect of social-emotional agnosia is usually assessed with the Strange Stories test. The subject or patient is presented with two sets of stories: social stories that refer to people's emotional states and physical stories that refer to physical behaviors. Those with deficits in determining others' emotional states will answer questions regarding the emotional stories incorrectly but will answer questions regarding the physical stories correctly (showing that their comprehension of the stories is not impaired but instead that their comprehension of emotional states in others is impaired).

==== Other tests ====
Another test that could be used to diagnose emotional deficits is the Facial Recognition Test, where subjects are presented a number of pictures of faces with a variety of expressions, and are asked to determine what emotion they are depicting.

=== Differential diagnosis ===
The constellation of symptoms in social-emotional agnosia can also be seen in a number of different behavioral disorders.

==== Autism or Asperger's syndrome ====
Both autism and Asperger's syndrome show deficits in understanding others' mental states, including the recognition of emotional expressions. Damage to the amygdala has also been implicated for these disorders, which can explain why the symptoms appear to overlap.

==== Klüver–Bucy syndrome ====
Although rare in humans, Klüver–Bucy syndrome has many symptoms that are strikingly similar to those seen in social-emotional agnosia. The amygdala and temporal lobes have been implicated in the pathology of Klüver–Bucy syndrome as well, leading to docility, hyperorality, and in some rare cases hypersexuality. Unlike patients of social-emotional agnosia, people with Klüver–Bucy syndrome also tend to demonstrate visual agnosia (inability to recognize visual stimuli) and have difficulties with visual perception.

== Research ==
Numerous studies with rhesus monkeys have been performed to see the effects of bilateral amygdala removal. In rhesus monkeys, bilateral destruction of the amygdala has been shown to significantly disturb the ability to behave in a socially normal manner with deficits in detecting the motivational and emotional states of other monkeys. Monkeys with amygdala damage that are reintroduced to their colony willfully exclude themselves from social interaction and isolate themselves from the group. Primate mothers with amygdala lesions appear to lose maternal affection towards their offspring. They seem to consider the offspring a foreign object, sometimes going so far as to harm or throw around the juvenile monkeys.

There have been additional studies with rhesus monkeys researching Klüver–Bucy syndrome, which shows similar pathologies and symptoms to social-emotional agnosia (see Related disorders for human comparison). Monkeys with Klüver–Bucy syndrome demonstrated a loss of fear and aggression, hyperorality, and hypersexuality. Unlike the previously mentioned studies regarding amygdala lesions, these monkeys demonstrated problems with visual perception.
