= Logopenic progressive aphasia =

Neurological disorder

Logopenic progressive aphasia (LPA) is a variant of primary progressive aphasia. It is defined clinically by impairments in naming and sentence repetition. It is similar to conduction aphasia and is associated with atrophy to the left posterior temporal cortex and inferior parietal lobule. It is suspected that an atypical form of Alzheimer's disease is the most common cause of logopenic progressive aphasia.

Although patients with the logopenic variant of PPA are still able to produce speech, their speech rate may be significantly slowed due to word retrieval difficulty. Over time, they may experience the inability to retain lengthy information, causing problems with understanding complex verbal information. Some additional behavioral features include irritability, anxiety and agitation.

Compared to other subtypes of primary progressive aphasia, the logopenic variant has been found to be associated with cognitive and behavioral characteristics. Studies have shown that patients with the logopenic variant perform significantly worse on tests of calculation than other primary progressive aphasia patients. Several logopenic variant patients, especially those with Alzheimer's disease pathology, have also been found to perform poorly on memory tasks.

Logopenic progressive aphasia is caused by damage to segregated brain regions, specifically the inferior parietal lobe and superior temporal regions. Difficulties in naming are produced from the thinning of the inferior parietal lobe. Damage to the dorsal pathways creates language deficiency in patients that is characteristic of logopenic progressive aphasia.

== See also ==
- Aphasia
- Dementia
- Early-onset Alzheimer's disease
