= Semantic dementia =

Loss of semantic memory, primarily in the verbal domain

- Other names: semantic variant primary progressive aphasia
- Specialty: Neurology

In neurology, semantic dementia (SD), also known as semantic variant primary progressive aphasia (svPPA), is a progressive neurodegenerative disorder characterized by loss of semantic memory in both the verbal and non-verbal domains. However, the most common presenting symptoms are in the verbal domain (with loss of word meaning). Semantic dementia is a disorder of semantic memory that causes patients to lose the ability to match words or images to their meanings. However, it is fairly rare for patients with semantic dementia to develop category-specific impairments, though there have been documented cases of it occurring. Typically, a more generalized semantic impairment results from dimmed semantic representations in the brain.

SD is one of the three canonical clinical syndromes associated with frontotemporal lobar degeneration (FTLD), with the other two being frontotemporal dementia and progressive nonfluent aphasia. SD is a clinically defined syndrome but is associated with predominantly temporal lobe atrophy (left greater than right) and hence is sometimes called temporal variant FTLD (tvFTLD). SD is one of the three variants of primary progressive aphasia (PPA), which results from neurodegenerative disorders such as FTLD or Alzheimer's disease. The other two variants of primary progressive aphasia (PPA) are logopenic variant PPA (lvPPA) and confluent-agrammatic variant PPA (navPPA). There are distinctions between Alzheimer's disease and semantic dementia with regard to types of memory affected. In general, Alzheimer's disease is referred to as a disorder affecting mainly episodic memory, defined as the memory related to specific, personal events distinct for each individual. Semantic dementia generally affects semantic memory, which refers to long-term memory that deals with common knowledge and facts.

SD was first described by Arnold Pick in 1904 and in modern times was characterized by Professor Elizabeth Warrington in 1975, but it was not given the name semantic dementia until 1989. The clinical and neuropsychological features, and their association with temporal lobe atrophy were described by Professor John Hodges and colleagues in 1992.

== Presentation ==
The defining characteristic of SD is decreased performance on tasks that require semantic memory. This includes difficulty with naming pictures and objects, single word comprehension, categorizing, and knowing uses and features of objects. SD patients also have difficulty with spontaneous speech creation, using words such as "this" or "things" where more specific and meaningful words can be used. At earlier stages, patients may replace words with vague terms; as an example, 'crow' may become 'bird', then 'animal', before ultimately becoming 'thing'. Syntax is spared, and SD patients have the ability to discern syntactic violations and comprehend sentences with minimal lexical demands. SD patients have selectively worse concrete word knowledge and association, but retain knowledge and understanding of abstract words. SD patients are able to retain knowledge of numbers and music, but have more difficulty with concrete concepts with visual associations. Impairments of processing of phonemic structure and prosodic predictability have also been observed.

=== Hemispheric lateralization and modality-specific deficits ===
Research has shown that the lateralization of temporal lobe atrophy in semantic dementia produces distinct patterns of semantic memory impairment. A study was done on a cohort of 41 patients with semantic dementia, where it was shown that performance deficits occurred in accordance with the predominantly affected hemisphere. Patients with predominantly left temporal lobe damage (31 patients) exhibited poorer naming and comprehension abilities. Conversely, patients with predominantly right temporal lobe damage (10 patients; a smaller subgroup) exhibiting poorer facial recognition, picture interpretation, and comprehension of visual information. This hemispheric dissociation indicates that semantic memory is organized in a modality-specific manner. While semantic dementia affects both the right and left temporal lobe, the incongruence of atrophy will play a role in the clinical symptoms displayed.

== Genetics ==
The majority of SD patients have ubiquitin-positive, TDP-43 positive, tau-negative inclusions, although other pathologies have been described more infrequently, namely tau-positive Pick's disease and Alzheimer's pathology. Of all the FTLD syndromes, SD is least likely to run in families and is usually sporadic.

=== Alzheimer's disease and semantic dementia ===
Alzheimer's disease is related to semantic dementia, which both have similar symptoms. The main difference between the two being that Alzheimer's is categorized by atrophy to both sides of the brain while semantic dementia is categorized by loss of brain tissue in the front portion of the left temporal lobe. With Alzheimer's disease in particular, interactions with semantic memory produce different patterns in deficits between patients and categories over time which is caused by distorted representations in the brain. For example, in the initial onset of Alzheimer's disease, patients have mild difficulty with the artifacts category. As the disease progresses, the category specific semantic deficits progress as well, and patients see a more concrete deficit with natural categories. In other words, the deficit tends to be worse with living things as opposed to non-living things.

== Diagnosis ==
SD patients generally have difficulty generating familiar words or recognizing familiar objects and faces. Clinical signs include fluent aphasia, anomia (inability to recall names of persons or things), impaired comprehension of word meaning, and associative visual agnosia (inability to match semantically related pictures or objects). As the disease progresses, behavioral and personality changes are often seen similar to those seen in frontotemporal dementia.

SD patients perform poorly on tests of semantic knowledge. Published tests include both verbal and non-verbal tasks, e.g., The Warrington Concrete and Abstract Word Synonym Test, and The Pyramids and Palm Trees task. Testing also reveals deficits in picture naming (e.g. "dog" for a picture of a hippopotamus) and decreased category fluency. The question "What is a Stapler?" has been used as a primary diagnostic technique for discerning how SD patients understand word meaning.

Speech of SD patients is marked by word-finding pauses, reduced frequency of content words, semantic paraphasias, circumlocutions, increased ratios of verbs to nouns, increased numbers of adverbs, and multiple repeats.

SD patients sometimes show symptoms of surface dyslexia, a relatively selective impairment in reading low-frequency words with exceptional or atypical spelling-to-sound correspondences.

It is currently unknown why semantic memory is impaired and semantic knowledge deteriorates in SD patients, though the cause may be due to damage to an amodal semantic system. This theory is supported by the atrophy of the anterior temporal lobe, which is believed to contain a component of the semantic system that integrates conceptual information. Others hypothesize that the damage is predominantly to the ventral temporal cortex, since SD patients remember numbers and music, but have trouble associating visual cues to concrete words.

Due to the variety of symptoms dementia patients present, it becomes more difficult to assess semantic memory capability especially with regard to musical elements. In order to circumvent the explicit verbal learning tests for dementia, semantic melodic matching is a useful technique for detecting the semantic memory of semantic dementia patients. Moreover, it is important to maintain that these tests must be compared to nonmusical domain tests, as music cognition is not often measured in semantic dementia patients (less data available).

=== Physical changes ===
Structural and functional MRI imaging show a characteristic pattern of atrophy in the temporal lobes (predominantly on the left), with inferior greater than superior involvement and anterior temporal lobe (including hippocampal formation and amygdala) atrophy greater than posterior. As the disease progresses, this atrophy spreads to the ventromedial prefrontal cortical regions. This distinguishes it from Alzheimer's disease. Meta-analyses on MRI and FDG-PET studies confirmed these findings by identifying alterations in the inferior temporal poles and amygdalae as the hotspots of disease - brain regions that have been discussed in the context of conceptual knowledge, semantic information processing, and social cognition. Based on these imaging methods, semantic dementia can be regionally dissociated from the other subtypes of frontotemporal lobar degeneration, frontotemporal dementia, and progressive nonfluent aphasia.

Selective hypometabolism of glucose has been observed in the anterior temporal lobe, as well as the medial temporal lobe and limbic areas.

Damage to white matter tracts connecting the anterior temporal cortex to the inferior longitudinal, arcuate, and uncinate fasciculi, which are regions of the language network, is also seen using diffusion tensor imaging. Imaging also shows the integrity of the axonal connections from the anterior temporal cortex to frontal and posterior associative areas to be altered.

Functional abnormalities have also been observed in hippocampal structures, the ventromedial prefrontal cortex, and the cingulate cortex.

=== Memory in dementia: musical objects, musical concepts, and semantic memory ===
Melodies are a key aspect of musical objects that are thought to form the contents of semantic memory for music. Melodies are defined as familiar tunes that become associated with musical or extra musical meaning. Using familiar songs, such as Christmas carols, were used to test whether SD patients were able to recognize the tones and melodies of the songs if the patients were just given the words of the song. In the analysis of semantic memory using melodies as stimuli, the contents of semantic memory can include many other aspects aside from recognition of the melody, such as the general information about the music (composer, genre, year of release). Results have shown that musicians who have semantic dementia are able to identify and recognize certain melodic tones.

Further exploring the tests of music and semantic memory, results of a study that centered on the comprehension of emotion in music indicated that Alzheimer's Disease (AD) patients retained the ability to discern emotions from a song while non-AD degenerative disease patients, such as those with semantic dementia (SD), show impaired comprehension of these emotions. Moreover, several dementia patients, all with varied musical experience and knowledge, all demonstrated an understanding of the fundamental governing rules of western music. Essentially, it was found that superordinate knowledge of music, such as the rules of composition, may be more robust than knowledge of specific music.

Regarding the neurobiological correlates for this study, it was determined, via lesion studies, that bilateral (but especially the left-side of the brain) fronto-temporoparietal areas are significant in the associative processing of melodies. Based on the data of imaging studies that looked at the localization of processing melodies, it can be inferred that the anatomical location of the processes in consistent with the findings that some SD patients have intact melody recognition. Additionally, the neurobiological basis for musical emotion identification implicated the limbic and paralimbic structures in this process. Overall, the results of these studies suggest that the neurobiological basis of musical semantic memory is bilaterally located in the cerebral hemispheres, likely around the fronto-temporal areas of the brain.

== Treatment ==
There is currently no known curative treatment for SD, and no pharmacological interventions have been shown to slow disease progression. The average duration of illness is 8–10 years. Progression of SD can lead to behavioral and social difficulties, thus supportive care is essential for improving quality of life in SD patients as they grow more incomprehensible. Continuous practice in lexical learning has been shown to improve semantic memory in SD patients. No preventative measures for SD are recognized.

While no pharmacological interventions have been introduced, there have been behavioral interventions that have shown success in experimental settings. These experimental approaches focus on vocabulary retraining in order to improve word retrieval. Studies also show that semantic dementia patients can improve their ability to name objects through targeted cognitive intervention. Notably, these improvements do have a tendency to fade over time if the intervention practice is not maintained, and longevity of treatment is variable among patients depending on the progression of the disease.

== Summary ==
Semantic dementia (SD), or semantic variant primary progressive aphasia (svPPA), is a progressive neurodegenerative disease that is characterized by gradual loss of semantic memory (knowledge of word meaning, objects, and general facts).

SD is the progressive deterioration of conceptual knowledge while other cognitive abilities, including syntax, phonology, and episodic memory, remain relatively preserved in early stages. Usually the condition is considered an anomia, because it causes the inability for patients to recall the names of persons or things. Patients can typically describe the object in detail, or even use hand gestures to show what the object does, but are unable to name it instead using vaguer terms like "thing". Over time, patients lose their knowledge of the meaning of words, and may begin to struggle with understanding the use of everyday objects.

Neuroimaging reveals a characteristic pattern of asymmetric temporal lobe atrophy, predominantly affecting the left hemisphere, with the anterior temporal lobes and temporal pole showing the greatest degeneration. Research has demonstrated that the lateralization of atrophy produces distinct clinical profiles: left-predominant damage results in verbal semantic deficits, while right-predominant damage causes greater impairment in face and picture recognition. The disease typically progresses over 8–10 years, with atrophy spreading from anterior to posterior temporal regions, eventually affecting ventromedial prefrontal areas.

Currently, there is no curative treatment or pharmacological intervention for SD. Treatment plans focus on behavioral interventions, specifically vocabulary retraining programs. Experimental trials have shown success in improving word retrieval for trained items in experimental settings, though ongoing maintenance practice is necessary. Supportive care addressing communication difficulties and behavioral changes remains essential for maintaining quality of life as the disease progresses.
