= Irene Litvan =

Uruguayan-American neurologist and neuroscientist

- Born: 1951 (age 74–75); Montevideo, Uruguay
- Education: Universidad de la República
- Known for: Diagnostic criteria for atypical parkinsonian disorders and mild cognitive impairment in Parkinson's disease
- Scientific career
- Fields: Neurology; movement disorders; neurodegenerative disease
- Workplaces: University of California, San Diego

Irene Litvan is a Uruguayan American neurologist and neuroscientist specializing in movement disorders and neurodegenerative disease. She is the Tasch Endowed Professor of Neurology and Neurosciences at the University of California, San Diego and director of the Parkinson and Other Movement Disorders Center.

== Early life and education ==
Litvan was born in Montevideo, Uruguay. She received her medical degree from the Universidad de la República in 1979. She completed neurological and neuropsychological training in Barcelona, Spain, and a neurology residency at Georgetown University Hospital from 1989 to 1992.

== Career ==
Litvan spent nine years at the National Institutes of Health. She subsequently served on the faculty of the University of Louisville, where she established a movement disorders center.

She later joined the University of California, San Diego, where she became the Tasch Endowed Professor of Parkinson's Disease Research and director of the Parkinson and Other Movement Disorders Center. The center has been designated a Parkinson Foundation Center of Excellence, a CurePSP Center of Care, a Research Center of Excellence in Lewy Body Dementia, and a Multiple System Atrophy Center of Excellence.

Litvan has served on advisory panels for the National Institutes of Health, the U.S. Food and Drug Administration, and the Michael J. Fox Foundation for Parkinson's Research. Within the International Parkinson and Movement Disorder Society, she has served as Treasurer and as Chair of the Pan American Section. She is Chief Editor of Frontiers in Neurology.

== Research ==
Litvan's research has focused on Parkinson's disease and related disorders, particularly, progressive supranuclear palsy, corticobasal degeneration, multiple system atrophy, and dementia with Lewy bodies.

She was a lead author of the 1996 clinical research criteria for progressive supranuclear palsy, published in Neurology. She contributed to consensus diagnostic criteria for corticobasal degeneration, published in Neurology in 2013. She chaired the Movement Disorder Society task force that developed diagnostic criteria for mild cognitive impairment in Parkinson's disease, published in Movement Disorders in 2012.

Her research has also addressed digital biomarkers for Parkinson's disease, including work on wearable electrochemical sensors for levodopa monitoring.

== Awards and honors ==
Litvan received the NIH Merit Award in 1996. She received the American Academy of Neurology Movement Disorders Research Award in 2018. In 2019, she was elected a foreign member of the National Academy of Medicine of Uruguay. She received honorary membership from the International Parkinson and Movement Disorder Society in 2023. She received the Faculty Excellence in Leadership Award from UC San Diego Health Sciences in 2026. She has been ranked among the top 1% of most-cited researchers worldwide by Web of Science each year since 2018.

== Media coverage ==
In 2007, the Uruguayan newspaper El País profiled Litvan's research on Parkinson's and Alzheimer's disease. In 2022, the same newspaper published a feature article on her international scientific recognition.

== Selected publications ==
- Litvan I, Agid Y, Calne D, et al. Clinical research criteria for the diagnosis of progressive supranuclear palsy (Steele-Richardson-Olszewski syndrome). Neurology. 1996;46(1):1–9. PMID: 8710059
- Litvan I, Goldman JG, Tröster AI, et al. Diagnostic criteria for mild cognitive impairment in Parkinson's disease. Movement Disorders. 2012;27(3):349–356.
- Armstrong MJ, Litvan I, Lang AE, et al. Criteria for the diagnosis of corticobasal degeneration. Neurology. 2013;80(5):496–503.
- Höglinger GU, Respondek G, Stamelou M, et al. Clinical diagnosis of progressive supranuclear palsy: The Movement Disorder Society criteria. Movement Disorders. 2017;32(6):853–864.
- Teymourian H, Tehrani F, Longardner K, Mahato K, Podhajny T, Moon JM, Kotagiri YG, Sempionatto JR, Litvan I, Wang J. Closing the loop for patients with Parkinson disease: where are we? Nat Rev Neurol. 2022 Aug;18(8):497-507.
- Mahato K, Moon JM, Moonla C, Longardner K, Ghodsi H, Litvan I, Wang J. Biosensor Strip for Rapid On-site Assessment of Levodopa Pharmacokinetics along with Motor Performance in Parkinson's Disease. Angew Chem Int Ed Engl. 2024 Jul 1;63(27).
