= Micrographia (handwriting) =

Abnormally small, cramped handwriting

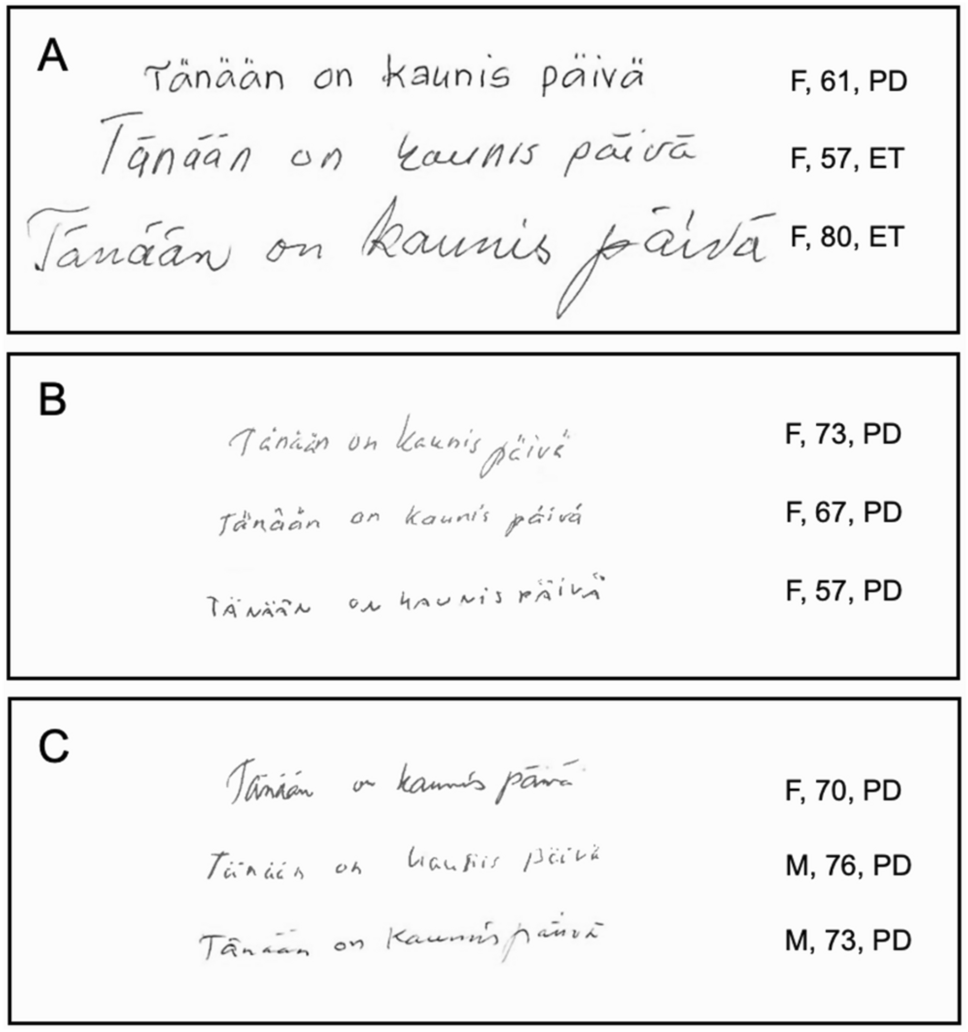
Examples of micrographia

Micrographia is an acquired disorder characterized by abnormally small, cramped handwriting. It is commonly associated with neurodegenerative disorders of the basal ganglia, such as in Parkinson's disease, but it has also been ascribed to subcortical focal lesions. O'Sullivan and Schmitz describe it as an abnormally small handwriting that is difficult to read, as seen in the accompanying photo. Micrographia is also seen in patients with Wilson's disease, obsessive-compulsive disorder, metamorphopsia, or isolated focal lesions of the midbrain or basal ganglia.

== Parkinson's disease ==
A common feature of Parkinson's disease (PD) is difficulty in routine activities due to lack of motor control. Patients have trouble maintaining the scale of movements and have reduced amplitude of movement (hypokinesia). In PD, the trouble in scaling and controlling the amplitude of movement affects complex, sequential movements, so that micrographia is a common symptom. Another cause of micrographia is lack of physical dexterity. James Parkinson may have been aware of micrographia in patients with shaking palsy (later renamed Parkinson's disease), when he described "the hand failing to answer with exactness to the dictates of the will".

=== Occurrence in Parkinson's ===
Micrographia is often seen amongst patients with PD, although the precise prevalence is uncertain, with reported figures between 9 and 75%. Often appearing before other symptoms, it can help in diagnosis.

=== Pharmacological management ===
Micrographia may worsen when a PD patient is undermedicated and when the medication is wearing off.
