= Parkinson's disease =

Progressive neurodegenerative disease

- Other names: Idiopathic or primary parkinsonism; paralysis agitans; shaking palsy
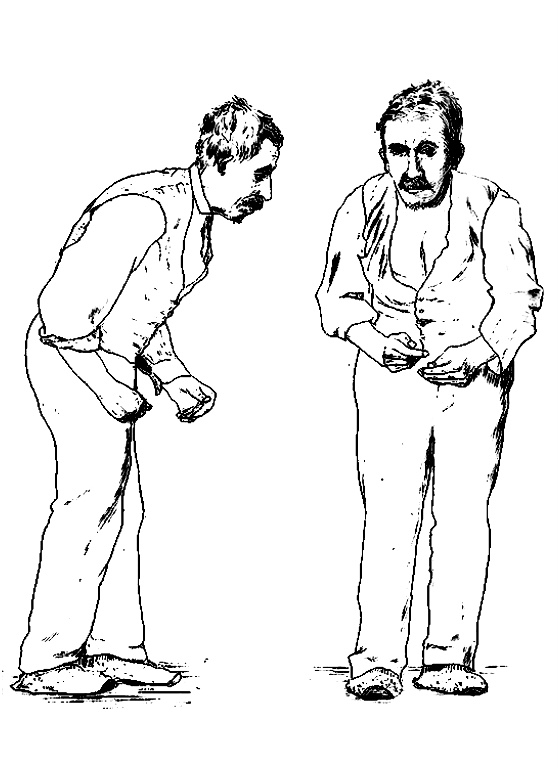
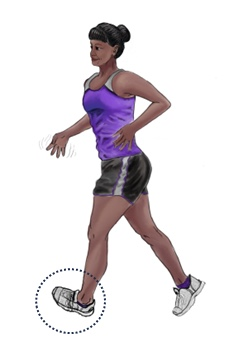
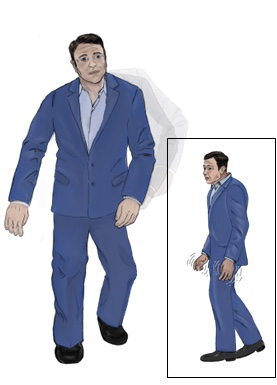
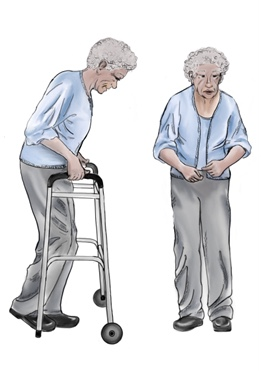
- A. 1880s illustration of Parkinson's disease (PD) B. Mild motor-predominant PD C. Intermediate PD D. Diffuse malignant PD
- Specialty: Neurology
- Symptoms: Tremor; bradykinesia; rigidity; postural instability; dysautonomia; depression; anxiety; sleep abnormalities
- Complications: Falls; dementia; aspiration pneumonia
- Usual onset: Age over 60
- Duration: Long-term
- Risk factors: Family history; age; pesticide exposure; head injuries
- Diagnostic method: History and neurologic examination; medical imaging
- Differential diagnosis: Dementia with Lewy bodies; progressive supranuclear palsy; essential tremor; antipsychotic use; Wilson's disease
- Treatment: Supportive measures and control of symptoms, physical therapy, deep brain stimulation, medication
- Medication: Levodopa, COMT inhibitors, AAAD inhibitors, dopamine agonists, MAO-B inhibitors
- Prognosis: Decreased life expectancy
- Frequency: 0.2% (Canada)
- Named after: James Parkinson

Parkinson's disease (PD), or simply Parkinson's, is a neurodegenerative disease primarily of the central nervous system, affecting both motor and non-motor systems. The motor symptoms, collectively called parkinsonism, include tremors, slowness in initiating movement (bradykinesia), rigidity, and difficulty maintaining balance (postural instability). Non-motor symptoms may appear at any stage of the disease, including autonomic nervous system failures (dysautonomia), sleep abnormalities, decreased ability to smell (anosmia), and behavioral changes or neuropsychiatric problems, such as cognitive impairment, psychosis, and anxiety. Symptoms typically develop gradually, and non-motor issues become more prevalent as the disease progresses.

Parkinson's disease has no single cause; rather, genetic and environmental factors interact to affect critical cellular processes. Parkinson's disease involves the gradual decay and loss of dopamine-producing neurons in a brain region called the substantia nigra and other related cell groups in the brainstem. Misfolded proteins, such as alpha-synuclein, aggregate to form clumps called Lewy bodies, if not cleared from cells by cellular degradation systems. Protein accumulation stimulates the release of pro-inflammatory molecules by the microglia, a protective response that can cause neuroinflammation, further neuronal damage, and disruption of metabolic systems, if remaining chronic.

Diagnosis is primarily based on signs and symptoms, typically motor-related, identified through neurological examination. Medical imaging such as PET scanning can support the diagnosis. Onset is typically in individuals over 60, with about one percent affected. In those younger than 50, the condition is termed "early-onset PD".

No cure for PD is known, and treatment focuses on improving symptoms. Initial treatment typically includes levodopa, MAO-B inhibitors, or dopamine agonists. As the disease progresses, these medications become less effective and may result in involuntary muscle movements. Diet and rehabilitation therapies can help aswell. Deep brain stimulation is used to manage severe motor symptoms when drugs are ineffective. Little evidence exists for treatments addressing non-motor symptoms, such as sleep disturbances and mood instability. Life expectancy is decreased compared to the unaffected.

== Classification and terminology ==
Parkinson's disease is a neurodegenerative disease affecting both the central and peripheral nervous systems, characterized by the loss of dopamine-producing neurons in the substantia nigra region of the brain. It is classified as a synucleinopathy due to the abnormal accumulation of the protein alpha-synuclein, which aggregates into Lewy bodies within affected neurons.

The loss of dopamine-producing neurons in the substantia nigra causes movement abnormalities, leading to the categorization of Parkinson's as a movement disorder. In 30% of those with PD, disease progression leads to cognitive decline, resulting in Parkinson's disease dementia (PDD). Alongside dementia with Lewy bodies, PDD is one of the two subtypes of Lewy body dementia.

The four cardinal motor symptoms of Parkinson's—slowed movements (bradykinesia), postural instability, rigidity, and tremor—are called parkinsonism. Parkinsonism is not exclusive to Parkinson's disease and can occur in other conditions, including HIV infection and recreational drug use. Neurodegenerative diseases that feature parkinsonism, but have distinct differences are grouped under the umbrella of Parkinson-plus syndromes, or alternatively, atypical parkinsonian disorders.

== Signs and symptoms ==
=== Motor ===
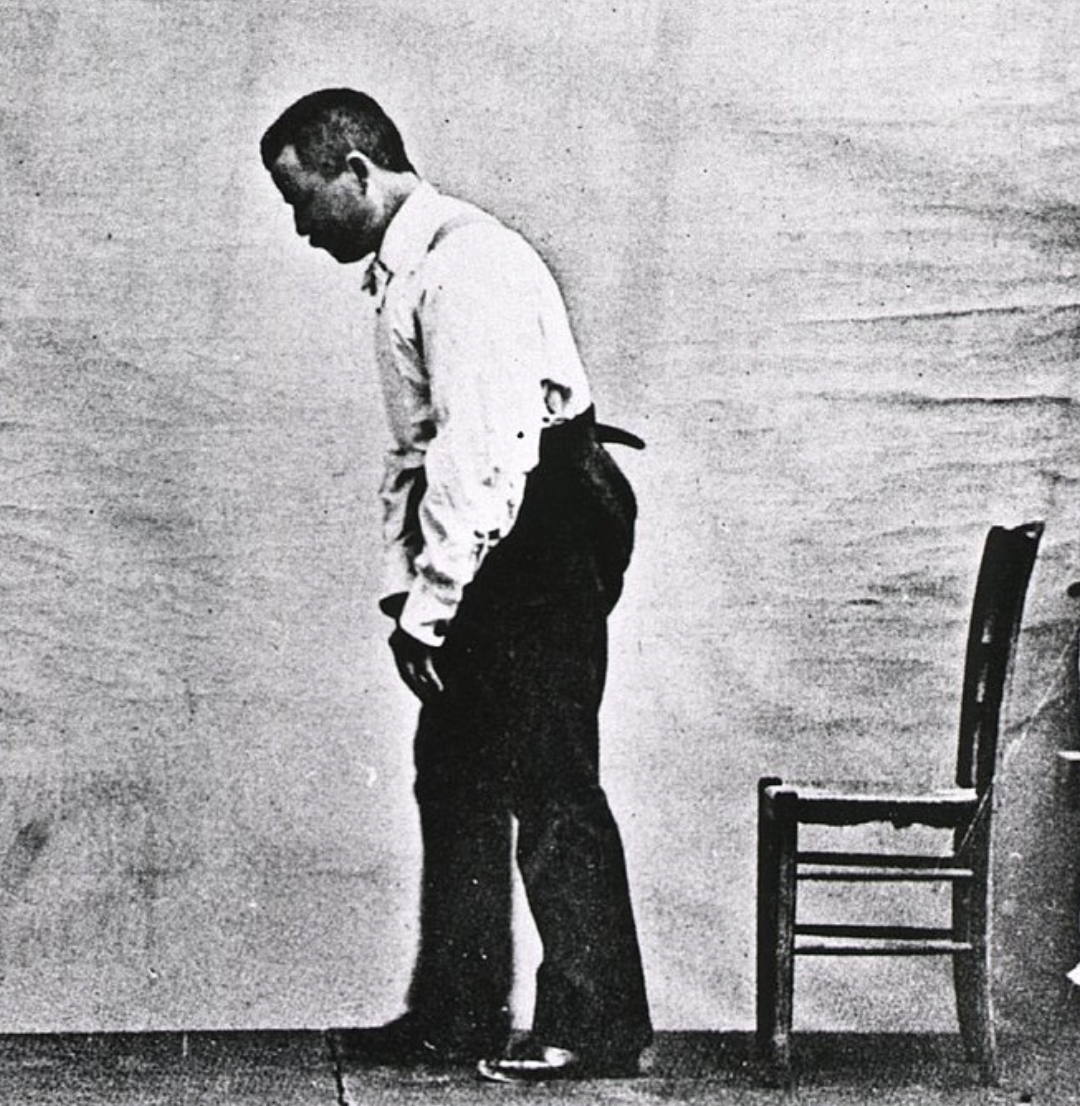
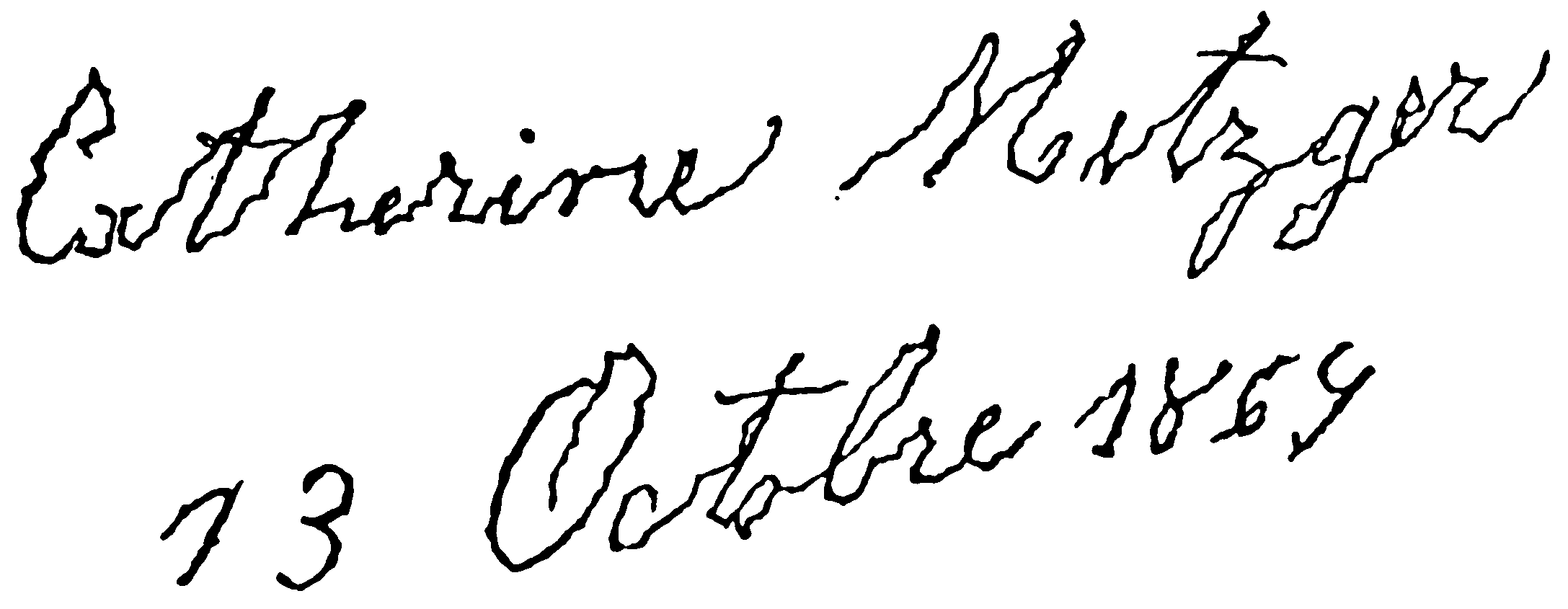
Motor symptoms include a stooping posture, the Parkinsonian gait, and micrographia—jagged, diminutive handwriting.

The cardinal motor features are tremor, bradykinesia, rigidity, and postural instability, collectively termed parkinsonism. Appearing in 70–75% of those with PD, tremor is often the predominant motor symptom. Resting tremor is the most common, but kinetic tremors—occurring during voluntary movements—and postural tremor—preventing upright, stable posture—also occur. Tremor largely affects the hands and feet: a classic parkinsonian tremor is "pill-rolling", a resting tremor in which the thumb and index finger make contact in a circular motion at 4–6 Hz frequency.

Bradykinesia describes difficulties in motor planning, beginning, and executing, resulting in overall slowed movement with reduced amplitude that affects sequential and simultaneous tasks. Bradykinesia can also lead to hypomimia, reduced facial expressions. Rigidity, also called rigor, refers to a feeling of stiffness and resistance to passive stretching of muscles. Postural instability typically appears in later stages, leading to impaired balance and falls. Postural instability also leads to a forward stooping posture.

Beyond the cardinal four, other motor deficits, termed secondary motor symptoms, commonly occur. Notably, gait disturbances result in the parkinsonian gait, which includes shuffling and paroxysmal deficits, where a normal gait is interrupted by rapid footsteps—known as festination—or sudden stops, impairing balance and causing falls. Most people with PD experience speech problems, including stuttering, hypophonic, "soft" speech, slurring, and festinating speech (rapid and poorly intelligible). Handwriting is commonly altered in PD, decreasing in size—known as micrographia—and becoming jagged and sharply fluctuating. Grip and dexterity are also impaired.

=== Neuropsychiatric and cognitive ===
Neuropsychiatric symptoms such as anxiety, apathy, depression, hallucination, and impulse control disorders occur in up to 60% of those with PD. They often precede motor symptoms, vary with disease progression, and may appear at any stage of the disease including the prodromal phase. Fluctuating symptoms including dysphoria (the opposite of euphoria), fatigue, and slowness of thought, are also common. Some neuropsychiatric symptoms are not directly caused by neurodegeneration, but rather by its pharmacological management.

Table featuring the prevalence of neuropsychiatric symptoms in PDNeuropsychiatric symptom prevalence in Parkinson's disease
Symptom
Symptom	Prevalence (%)
Anxiety	40–50
Apathy	40
Depression	20–40
Impulse control disorders	36–60
Psychosis	

Cognitive impairments rank among the most prevalent and debilitating non-motor symptoms. These deficits may emerge in the early stages or before diagnosis, and their prevalence and severity tend to increase with disease progression. Ranging from mild cognitive impairment to severe Parkinson's disease dementia, these impairments include executive dysfunction, slowed cognitive processing speed, and disruptions in time perception and estimation.

=== Autonomic ===
Autonomic nervous system failures, known as dysautonomia, can appear at any stage of PD. They are among the most debilitating symptoms and greatly reduce quality of life. Although almost all individuals with PD have cardiovascular autonomic dysfunction, only some are symptomatic. Chiefly, orthostatic hypotension—a sustained blood pressure drop of at least 20 mmHg systolic or 10 mmHg diastolic after standing—occurs in 30–50% of cases. This can result in lightheadedness or fainting; subsequent falls are associated with higher morbidity and mortality.

Other autonomic failures include gastrointestinal issues such as chronic constipation, impaired stomach emptying and subsequent nausea, excessive salivation, and dysphagia (difficulty swallowing); all greatly reduce quality of life. Dysphagia, for instance, can prevent pill swallowing and lead to aspiration pneumonia. Urinary incontinence, sexual dysfunction, and thermoregulatory dysfunction—including heat and cold intolerance and excessive sweating—also frequently occur.

=== Other ===
Sensory deficits appear in up to 90% of people with PD and are usually present at early stages. Nociceptive and neuropathic pain are common, with peripheral neuropathy affecting up to 55% of individuals. Visual impairments are also frequently observed, including deficits in visual acuity, color vision, eye coordination, and visual hallucinations. An impaired sense of smell is also prevalent. Individuals often struggle with spatial awareness, recognizing faces and emotions, and may experience challenges with reading and double vision.

Sleep disorders are highly prevalent in PD, affecting up to 98%. These disorders include insomnia, excessive daytime sleepiness, restless legs syndrome, REM sleep behavior disorder (RBD), and sleep-disordered breathing, many of which can be worsened by medication. RBD may begin years before the initial motor symptoms. Individual presentation of symptoms varies, although most people affected by PD show an altered circadian rhythm at some point of disease progression.

PD is also associated with a variety of skin disorders that include melanoma, seborrheic dermatitis, bullous pemphigoid, and rosacea. Seborrheic dermatitis is recognized as a premotor feature that indicates dysautonomia and demonstrates that PD can be detected not only by changes of nervous tissue, but also tissue abnormalities outside the nervous system.

== Causes ==
Parkinson's disease has no single cause: rather, genetic and environmental factors interact and affect critical cellular processes in a complex interplay. Parkinson's disease (PD) involves the gradual degeneration of dopamine producing neurons in a brain region called the substantia nigra and other related cell groups in the brainstem. This is accompanied by the accumulation of misfolded proteins such as alpha-synuclein. Alpha-synuclein is normally found in the presynaptic terminals of neurons. If alpha-synuclein is mis-folded and not cleared from cells by cellular degradation systems, it can build up to form clumps of proteins called Lewy bodies and Lewy neurites. Accumulation stimulates the release of pro-inflammatory molecules by the microglia, a protective response that can cause inflammation and neuronal damage if it becomes chronic. Neuroinflammation causes the blood-brain barrier (BBB) to become more permeable, allowing dangerous substances and inflammatory cells to enter the brain and interfere with metabolic functions. Dysfunction in mitochondria, which are central to cellular energy production, increases oxidative stress and cell death. Protein aggregation, inflammation and metabolic dysregulation in lysosomal, endosomal, and mitochondrial systems are interconnected mechanisms which create a cycle of inflammation, cellular stress and damage in Parkinson's disease.

The cumulative effects of many different environmental exposures over a lifetime interact with underlying genetic factors to influence PD development and progression. Genetically, about 5–10% of cases are familial while others are classed as idiopathic with no clearly identifiable cause. Variations in specific genes have been identified as risk factors and linked to contributing neural mechanisms. Environmentally, exposures to pesticides, metals, solvents, other toxicants and air pollution are increasingly seen as major risk factors in PD development. The brain is particularly vulnerable to chemicals that are able to cross the blood-brain barrier. Body-first and brain-first models of Parkinson's disease have been proposed to explain the connection of PD mechanisms with exposure to known environmental risk factors via the gut and the olfactory system. Traumatic brain injury and Type 2 diabetes are additional risk factors. Exercise, coffee consumption, and diets rich in fruits, vegetables, whole grains, and fish are protective factors associated with lower risk of PD.

=== Genetic ===
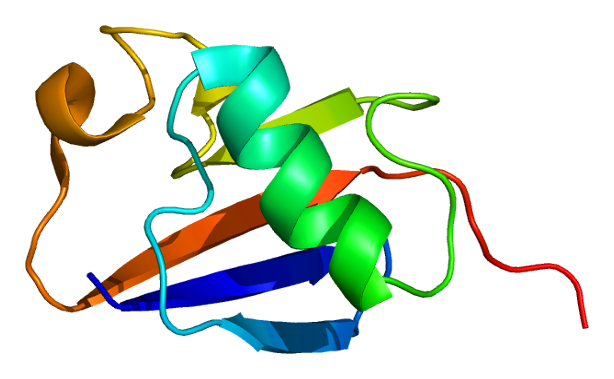
Ribbon diagram of parkin

Parkinson's can be narrowly defined as a genetic disease, as rare inherited gene variants have been firmly linked to monogenic PD, and most cases carry variants that increase PD risk. PD heritability is estimated to range from 22 to 40%. Around 15% of diagnosed individuals have a family history, of which 5–10% can be attributed to a causative risk gene mutation. Carrying one of these mutations may not lead to disease. Rates of familial PD vary by ethnicity; monogenic PD occurs in up to 40% of Arab-Berber and 20% of Ashkenazi Jewish people with PD.

Notable genetic risk variants include SNCA (which encodes alpha-synuclein), LRRK2, and VPS35 for autosomal dominant inheritance, and PRKN (parkin), PINK1, and DJ1 for autosomal recessive inheritance. LRRK2 is the most common autosomal dominant variant, responsible for 1–2% of all PD cases and 40% of familial cases. Parkin variants are associated with nearly half of recessive, early-onset monogenic PD. Mutations in the GBA1 gene are associated with cognitive decline.

=== Environmental ===
The limited heritability of Parkinson's suggests environmental factors are involved, though identifying these risk factors and establishing causality is challenging due to PD's decade-long prodromal (early signs) period.

Dorsey and Bloem (2024) argue that environmental toxicants such as pesticides, air pollution and trichloroethylene are linked to PD. Certain pesticides and herbicides—such as paraquat, glyphosate, and rotenone—are the most established environmental toxicants for PD and are likely causal. PD prevalence is associated with local pesticide use, and many pesticides are mitochondrial toxins. Paraquat, for instance, structurally resembles metabolized MPTP, which selectively kills dopaminergic neurons by inhibiting mitochondrial complex 1 and is widely used to model PD. Pesticide exposure after diagnosis may also accelerate disease progression.

=== Hypotheses ===
==== Prionic ====
The hallmark of PD is the formation of protein aggregates, beginning with alpha-synuclein fibrils and followed by Lewy bodies and Lewy neurites. The prion hypothesis suggests that alpha-synuclein aggregates are pathogenic and can spread to neighboring, healthy neurons and seed new aggregates. Some propose that the heterogeneity of PD may stem from different "strains" of alpha-synuclein aggregates and varying anatomical sites of origin. Alpha-synuclein propagation has been demonstrated in cell and animal models and is the most popular explanation for the progressive spread through specific neuronal systems. However, therapeutic efforts to clear alpha-synuclein have failed. Additionally, postmortem brain tissue analysis shows that alpha-synuclein pathology does not clearly progress through the nearest neural connections.

==== Braak's ====
In 2002, Heiko Braak and colleagues proposed that PD begins outside the brain and is triggered by a "neuroinvasion" of some unknown pathogen. The pathogen enters through the nasal cavity and is swallowed into the digestive tract, initiating Lewy pathology in both areas. This alpha-synuclein pathology may then travel from the gut to the central nervous system through the vagus nerve. This hypothesis could explain the presence of Lewy pathology in both the enteric nervous system and olfactory tract neurons, as well as clinical symptoms such as loss of smell and gastrointestinal problems. Environmental toxicants ingested in a similar manner might also trigger PD.

=== Risk factors ===
As 90% of PD cases are idiopathic, of an unknown cause, the identification of the risk factors that may influence disease progression or severity is critical. The most significant risk factor in developing PD is age, with a prevalence of 1% in those over 65 and around 4.3% in those over 85. Traumatic brain injury significantly increases PD risk. Consumption of milk and dairy products but not fermented milk and cheese is associated with a higher PD risk. Explanations such as environmental contamination of milk have been proposed. Individuals with PD have a higher risk of developing melanoma, with shared risk factors and some common clinical features. Also, an association was found between methamphetamine use and increased PD risk.

=== Protective factors ===
Although no compounds or activities have been mechanistically established as neuroprotective for PD, several factors have been found to be associated with a decreased risk. Exercise and diets rich in fruits, vegetables, whole grains, and fish are protective factors associated with lower risk of PD. Consumption of caffeine as an ingredient of coffee or tea is strongly associated with neuroprotection. Tobacco use and smoking are strongly associated with decreased risk, but it is unclear whether this results from a neuroprotective effect or reverse causation. Various tobacco and smoke components have been hypothesized to be neuroprotective, including nicotine, carbon monoxide, and monoamine oxidase B inhibitors.

Although findings have varied, usage of nonsteroidal anti-inflammatory drugs (NSAIDs) such as ibuprofen may be neuroprotective. Calcium channel blockers may also have a protective effect, with a 22% risk reduction reported. Higher blood concentrations of urate—a potent antioxidant—have been proposed to be neuroprotective. Alcohol consumption has been suggested to be associated with PD risk, but there is no clear relationship between alcohol consumption and PD.

== Mechanisms ==
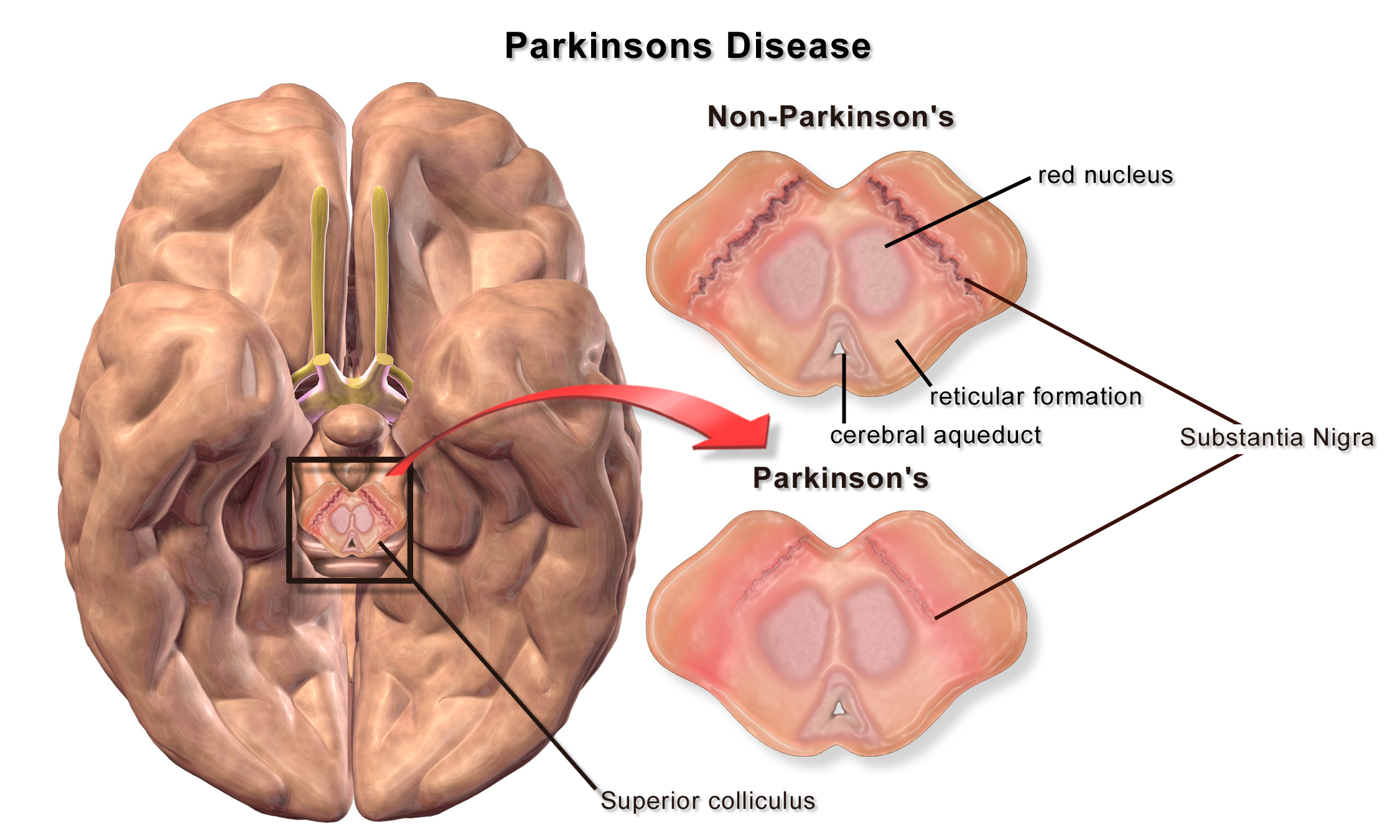
Parkinson's results from the death of dopamine-releasing neurons in the substantia nigra pars compacta, seen by the loss of dark neuromelanin in the lower inset.

Parkinson's disease has two hallmark pathophysiological processes: the abnormal aggregation of alpha-synuclein that leads to Lewy pathology, and the degeneration of dopaminergic neurons in the substantia nigra pars compacta. The death of these neurons reduces available dopamine in the striatum, which in turn affects circuits controlling movement in the basal ganglia. By the time motor symptoms appear, 50–80% of all dopaminergic neurons in the substantia nigra have degenerated.

Cell death and Lewy pathology, though, are not limited to the substantia nigra. The six-stage Braak system holds that alpha-synuclein pathology begins in the olfactory bulb or outside the central nervous system in the enteric nervous system before ascending the brain stem. In the third Braak stage, Lewy body pathology appears in the substantia nigra, and by the sixth step, Lewy pathology has spread to the limbic and neocortical regions. Although Braak staging offers a strong basis for PD progression, around 50% of individuals do not follow the predicted model. Lewy pathology is highly variable and may be entirely absent in some persons with PD.

=== Alpha-synuclein pathology ===
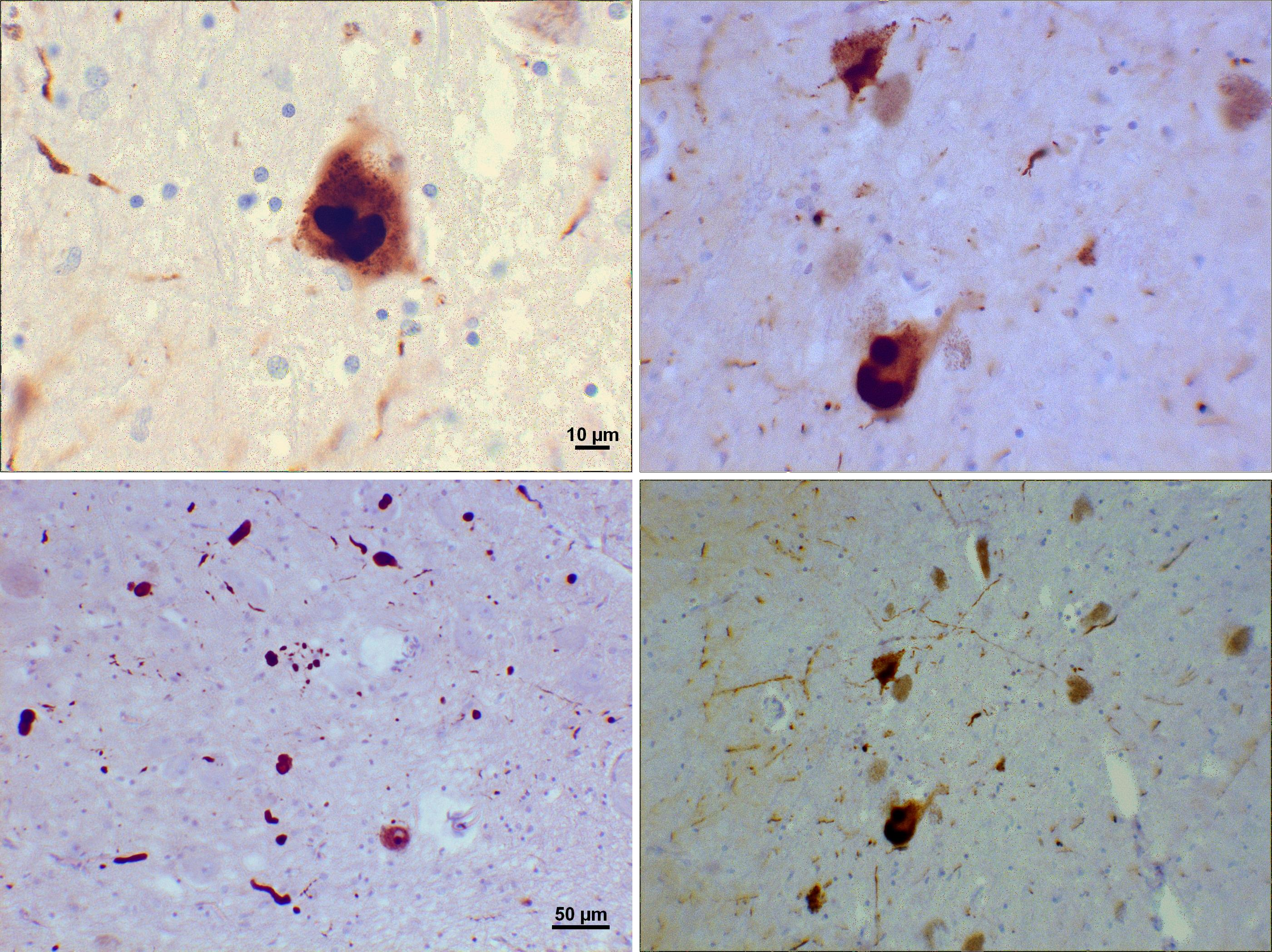
Lewy bodies and Lewy neurites stained brown in PD brain tissue

Alpha-synuclein is an intracellular protein typically localized to presynaptic terminals and involved in synaptic vesicle trafficking, intracellular transport, and neurotransmitter release. When misfolded, it can aggregate into oligomers and protofibrils that in turn lead to Lewy body formation. Due to their lower molecular weight, oligomers and protofibrils may disseminate and be transmitted to other cells more rapidly.

Lewy bodies consist of a fibrillar exterior and a granular core. Although alpha-synuclein is the dominant proteinaceous component, the core contains mitochondrial and autophagosomal membrane components, suggesting a link with organelle dysfunction. Whether Lewy bodies themselves contribute to or are simply the result of PD pathogenesis is unclear; alpha-synuclein oligomers can independently mediate cell damage, and neurodegeneration can precede Lewy body formation. It is of note that although the alpha-synuclein seeding activity (the propensity to form aggregates) significantly differs between the CSF of PD patients and healthy controls, no statistically significant associations between baseline CSF alpha-synuclein seeding activity and PD progression have yet been found.

=== Pathways involved in neurodegeneration ===
Three major pathways—vesicular trafficking, lysosomal degradation, and mitochondrial maintenance—are known to be affected by and contribute to PD pathogenesis, with all three linked to alpha-synuclein. High-risk gene variants also impair all three of these processes. All steps of vesicular trafficking are impaired by alpha-synuclein. It blocks endoplasmic reticulum (ER) vesicles from reaching the Golgi—leading to ER stress—and Golgi vesicles from reaching the lysosome, preventing alpha-synuclein degradation and leading to its build-up. Risky gene variants, chiefly GBA, further compromise lysosomal function. Although the mechanism is not well established, alpha-synuclein can impair mitochondrial function and cause subsequent oxidative stress. Mitochondrial dysfunction can, in turn, lead to further alpha-synuclein accumulation in a positive feedback loop. Microglial activation, possibly caused by alpha-synuclein, is also strongly indicated. Additionally, oxidative stress and other bioenergetic challenges have also been implicated in PD progression independent of alpha-synuclein pathology.

==== Mitochondrial dysfunction ====
Mitochondrial dysfunction is well-established in PD. Increased oxidative stress and reduced calcium buffering may contribute to neurodegeneration. The finding that MPP^{+}—a respiratory complex I inhibitor and MPTP metabolite—caused parkinsonian symptoms strongly implied that mitochondria contributed to PD pathogenesis. Additionally, faulty gene variants involved in familial PD—including PINK1 and Parkin—prevent the elimination of dysfunctional mitochondria through mitophagy.

==== Neuroinflammation ====
Some hypothesize that neurodegeneration arises from a chronic neuroinflammatory state created by local activated microglia and infiltrating immune cells. Mitochondrial dysfunction may also drive immune activation, particularly in monogenic PD. Some autoimmune disorders increase the risk of developing PD, supporting an autoimmune contribution. Additionally, influenza and herpes simplex virus infections increase the risk of PD, possibly due to a viral protein resembling alpha-synuclein. PD risk is also decreased with immunosuppressants.

== Diagnosis ==
Diagnosis of PD is largely clinical, relying on medical history and examination of symptoms, with an emphasis on symptoms that appear in later stages. Although early-stage diagnosis is not reliable, prodromal diagnosis may consider previous family history of PD and possible early symptoms such as rapid eye movement sleep behavior disorder (RBD), reduced sense of smell, and gastrointestinal issues. Isolated RBD is a particularly significant sign, as 90% of those affected will develop some form of neurodegenerative parkinsonism. Diagnosis in later stages requires parkinsonism, specifically bradykinesia and rigidity or tremor. Further support includes other motor and non-motor symptoms and genetic profiling.

A PD diagnosis is typically confirmed by any two of these criteria: responsiveness to levodopa, resting tremor, levodopa-induced dyskinesia, or a dopamine transporter scan confirmation. If these criteria are not met, atypical parkinsonism is considered. Definitive diagnoses can only be made post mortem through pathological analysis. Misdiagnosis is common, with a reported error rate near 25%, and diagnoses often change during follow-ups. Diagnosis can be further complicated by multiple overlapping conditions.

=== Imaging ===
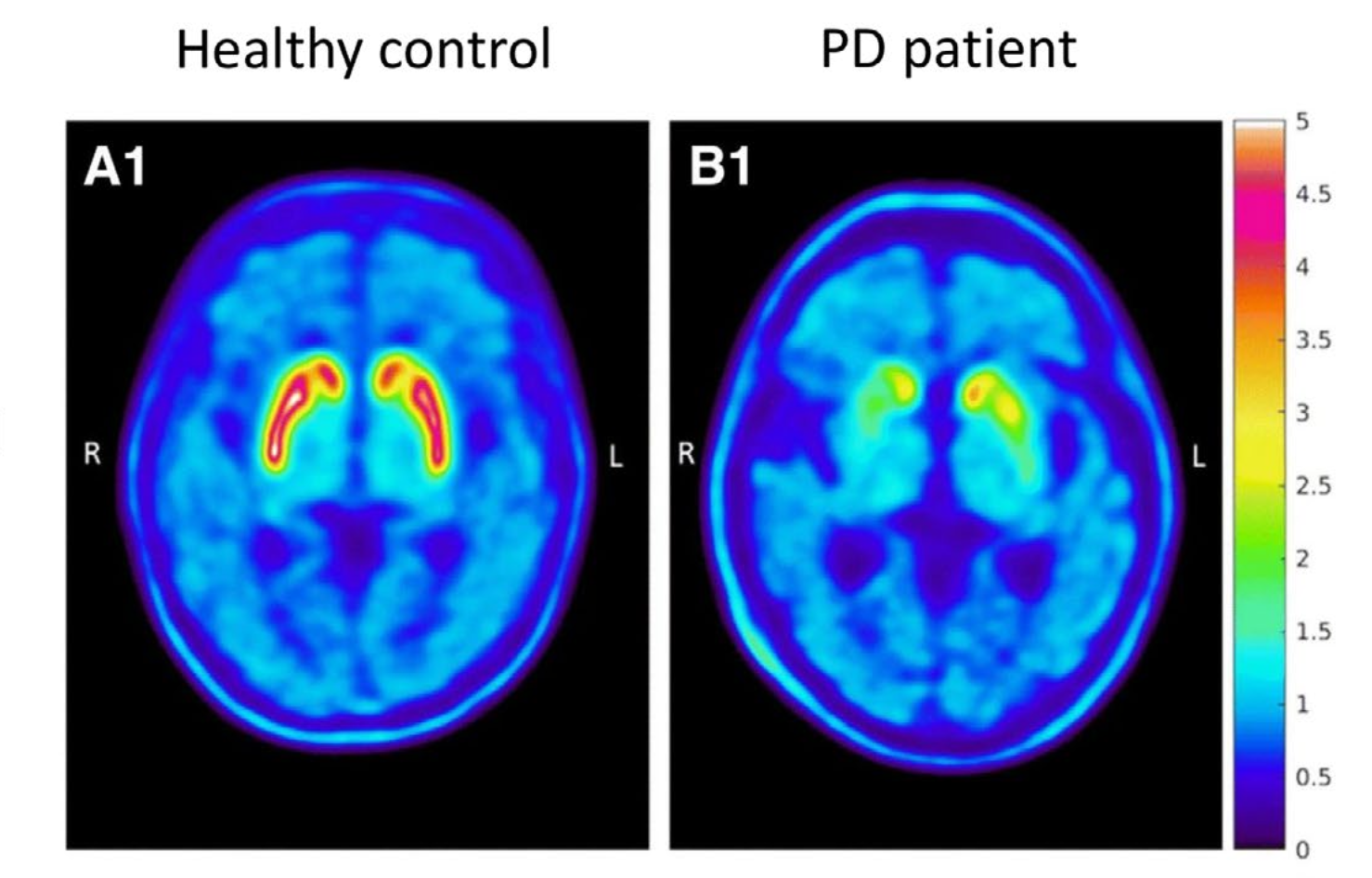
Reduced radioisotopic F-DOPA uptake in the striatum of a PD patient, captured through PET

Diagnosis can be aided by molecular imaging techniques such as magnetic resonance imaging (MRI), positron emission tomography (PET), and single-photon emission computed tomography (SPECT). As both conventional MRI and computed tomography (CT) scans are usually normal in early PD, they can be used to exclude other pathologies that cause parkinsonism. Diffusion MRI can differentiate PD from multiple system atrophy. Emerging MRI techniques of at least 3.0 T field strength—including neuromelanin-MRI, 1H-MRSI, and resting state fMRI—may detect abnormalities in the substantia nigra, nigrostriatal pathway, and elsewhere.

Unlike MRI, PET and SPECT use radioisotopes for imaging. Both techniques can aid diagnosis by characterizing PD-associated alterations in the metabolism and transport of dopamine in the basal ganglia. Largely used outside the United States, iodine-123-meta-iodobenzylguanidine myocardial scintigraphy can assess heart muscle denervation to support a PD diagnosis.

=== Differential diagnosis ===
Differential diagnosis of Parkinson's is among the most difficult in neurology. Differentiating early PD from atypical parkinsonian disorders is a major difficulty. In their initial stages, PD can be difficult to distinguish from the atypical neurodegenerative parkinsonisms, including multiple system atrophy, dementia with Lewy bodies, and the tauopathies progressive supranuclear palsy and corticobasal degeneration. Other conditions that may present similarly to PD include vascular Parkinsonism, Alzheimer's disease, and frontotemporal dementia.

The International Parkinson and Movement Disorder Society has proposed a set of criteria that, unlike the standard Queen's Square Brain Bank Criteria, includes non-exclusionary "red-flag" clinical features that may not suggest PD. A large number of "red flags" has been proposed and adopted for various conditions that might mimic the symptoms of PD. Diagnostic tests, including gene sequencing, molecular imaging techniques, and assessment of smell may also distinguish PD. MRI is particularly powerful due to several unique features for atypical parkinsonisms.

Disorder	Distinguishing symptoms and features
Corticobasal syndrome	Levodopa resistance, myoclonus, dystonia, corticosensory loss, alien limb phenomenon, apraxia, and non-fluent aphasia
Dementia with Lewy bodies	Levodopa resistance, cognitive predominance before motor symptoms, and fluctuating cognitive symptoms
Essential tremor	Tremor that worsens with action, normal SPECT scan
Multiple system atrophy	Levodopa resistance, rapidly progressive, autonomic failure, stridor, present Babinski sign, cerebellar ataxia, and specific MRI findings like the "Hot Cross Bun"
Progressive supranuclear palsy	Levodopa resistance, restrictive vertical gaze, pseudobulbar crying, eyelid twitching, specific MRI findings, and early and different postural difficulties

== Management ==
As of 2025, no disease-modifying therapies exist that reverse or slow neurodegeneration. Management typically combines lifestyle modifications with physical therapy. Current pharmacological interventions purely target symptoms, by either increasing endogenous dopamine levels or directly mimicking dopamine's effect on the patient's brain. These include dopamine agonists, MAO-B inhibitors, and levodopa—the most widely used and effective drug. The optimal time to initiate pharmacological treatment is debated, but initial dopamine agonist and MAO-B inhibitor treatment and later levodopa therapy are common. Invasive procedures such as deep brain stimulation may be used when medications are ineffective.

=== Medications ===
==== Levodopa ====
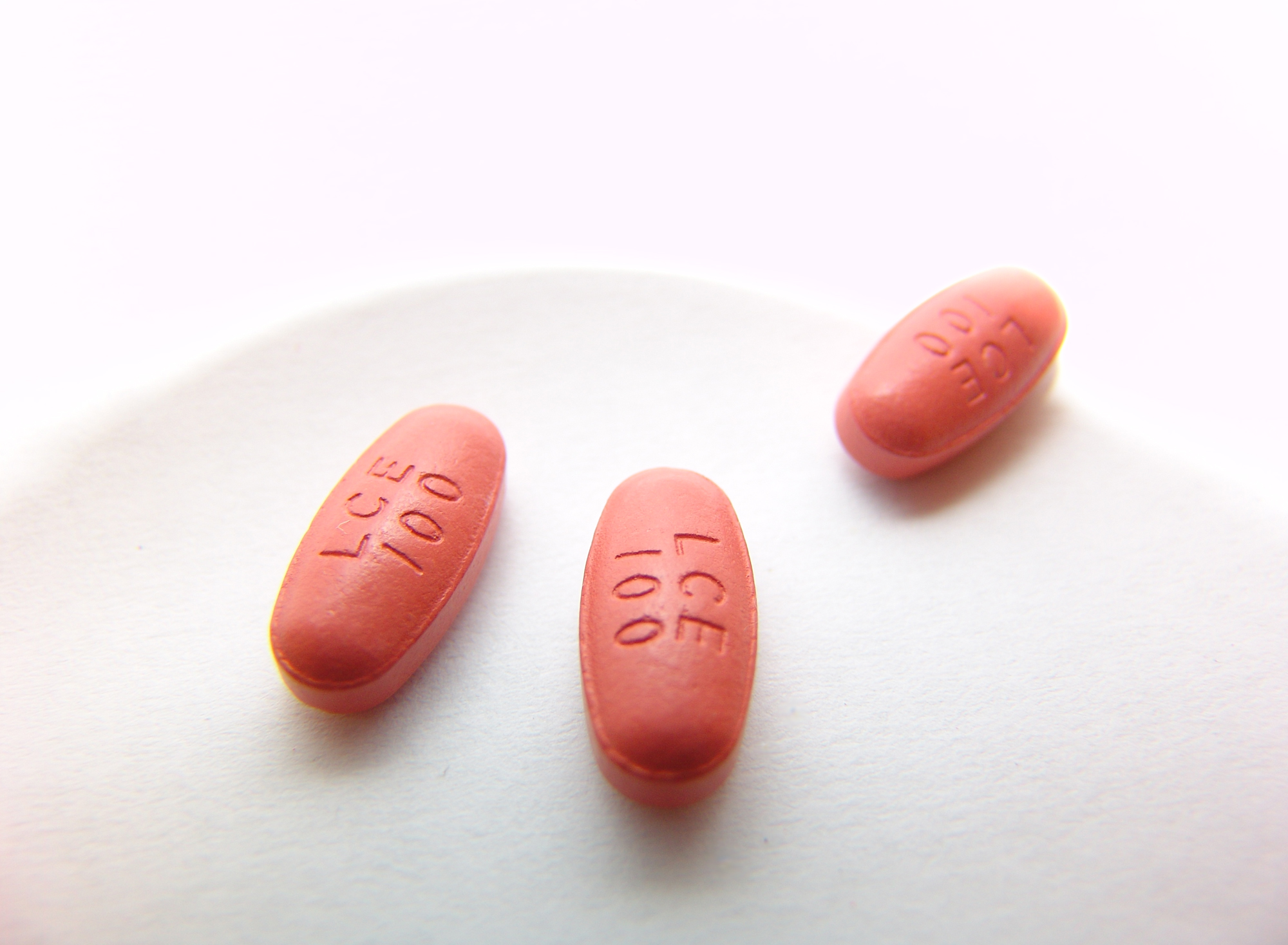
LCE (levodopa/carbidopa/entacapone) pills contain a cocktail of the dopamine precursor levodopa and COMT and AAAD inhibitors.

Levodopa is the most widely used and most effective therapy—the gold standard—for PD treatment. The compound occurs naturally and is the immediate precursor for dopamine synthesis in the dopaminergic neurons of the substantia nigra. Levodopa administration reduces the dopamine deficiency in parkinsonism.

Despite its efficacy, levodopa poses several challenges. Its administration has been called the "pharmacologist's nightmare". Its metabolism outside the brain by aromatic L-amino acid decarboxylase and catechol-O-methyltransferase can cause nausea and vomiting; inhibitors such as carbidopa, entacapone, and benserazide are usually taken with levodopa to mitigate these effects. (Note: These inhibitors do not cross the blood brain barrier, thus do not prevent levodopa metabolism there.) Long-term levodopa use may also induce dyskinesia and motor fluctuations. Although this often causes levodopa use to be delayed to later stages, earlier administration leads to improved motor function and quality of life.

==== Dopamine agonists ====
Dopamine agonists are an alternative or complement to levodopa therapy. They activate dopamine receptors in the striatum, with reduced risk of motor fluctuations and dyskinesia, and are efficacious in both early- and late-stage PD. The agonist apomorphine is often used for drug-resistant OFF time in later-stage PD. After five years of use, impulse-control disorders may occur in over 40% of those taking dopamine agonists. A problematic, narcotic-like withdrawal effect may occur when agonist use is reduced or stopped. Compared to levodopa, dopamine agonists are more likely to cause fatigue, daytime sleepiness, and hallucinations.

==== MAO-B inhibitors ====
MAO-B inhibitors—such as safinamide, selegiline and rasagiline—increase the amount of dopamine in the basal ganglia by inhibiting the activity of monoamine oxidase B, an enzyme that breaks down dopamine. These compounds mildly alleviate motor symptoms when used as monotherapy, but can also be used with levodopa and at any disease stage. Common side effects are nausea, dizziness, insomnia, sleepiness, and orthostatic hypotension. MAO-Bs are known to increase serotonin and cause a potentially dangerous condition known as serotonin syndrome.

==== Other drugs ====
Treatments for non-motor symptoms of PD have not been well studied, and many medications are used off-label. A diverse range of symptoms beyond those related to motor function can be treated pharmaceutically. Examples include cholinesterase inhibitors for cognitive impairment and modafinil for excessive daytime sleepiness. Fludrocortisone, midodrine, and droxidopa are commonly used off-label for orthostatic hypotension related to autonomic dysfunction. Sublingual atropine or botulinum toxin injections may be used off-label for drooling. SSRIs and SNRIs are often used for depression related to PD, but a risk exists of serotonin syndrome with the SSRI or SNRI antidepressants. Doxepin and rasagiline may reduce physical fatigue in PD.

=== Invasive interventions ===
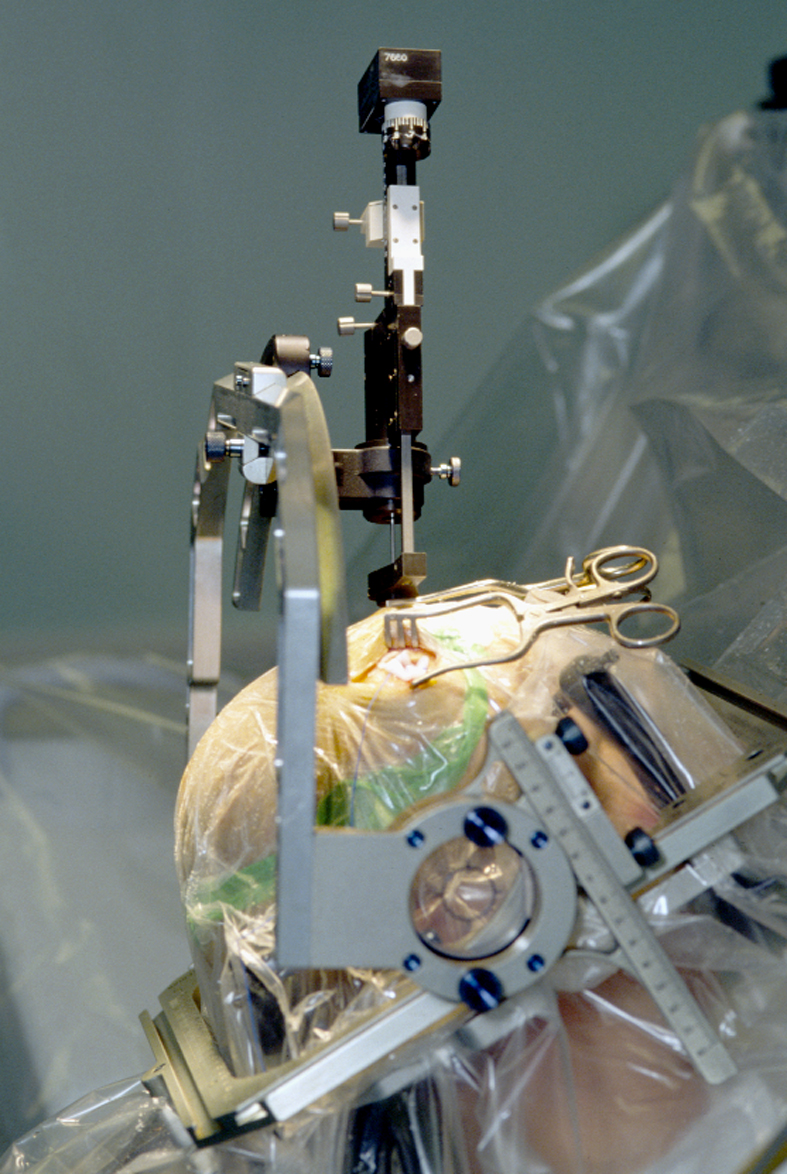
Placement of an electrode into the brain for deep brain stimulation

Surgery for PD first appeared in the 19th century, and by the 1960s, had evolved into ablative brain surgery that lesioned the basal ganglia, thalamus, or globus pallidus (a pallidotomy). The discovery of levodopa for PD treatment caused ablative therapies to largely disappear. Ablative surgeries experienced a resurgence in the 1990s, but were quickly superseded by newly developed deep brain stimulation (DBS). Although gamma knife and high-intensity focused ultrasound surgeries have been developed for pallidotomies and thalamotomies, their use is rare as of 2025.

DBS involves the implantation of electrodes called neurostimulators, which send electrical impulses to specific parts of the brain. DBS for the subthalamic nucleus and globus pallidus interna has high efficacy for up to 2 years, but long-term efficacy is unclear and likely decreases with time. DBS typically targets rigidity and tremor, and is recommended for PD patients who are intolerant or do not respond to medication. Cognitive impairment is the most common exclusion criteria.

=== Rehabilitation ===
Although pharmacological therapies can improve symptoms, autonomy, and the ability to perform everyday tasks is still reduced by PD. Rehabilitation is often useful, but the scientific support for any single rehabilitation treatment is limited.

Exercise programs are often recommended, with preliminary evidence of efficacy. Regular physical exercise with or without physical therapy can be beneficial to maintain and improve mobility, flexibility, strength, gait speed, and quality of life. Aerobic, mind-body, and resistance training may be beneficial in alleviating PD-associated depression and anxiety. Strength training may increase manual dexterity and strength, facilitating daily tasks that require grasping objects. Aerobic exercise, resistance training, and balance- and task-specific training have been found to improve strength, VO_{2} max and balance. While flexibility training is commonly used, it has a lower strength of recommendation compared to aerobic and resistance training.

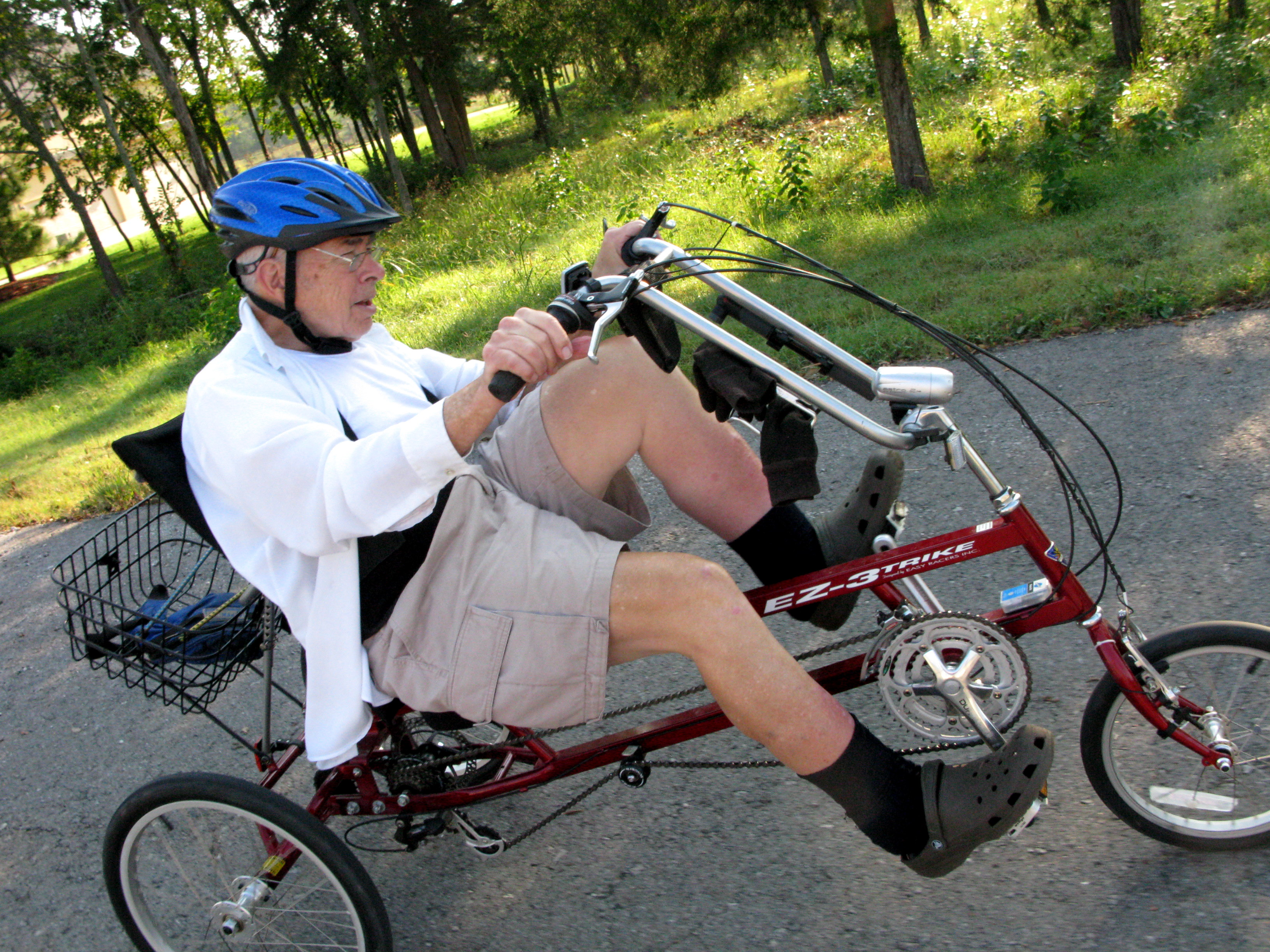
Exercise, like the tricycle ride of this PD patient, is often recommended.

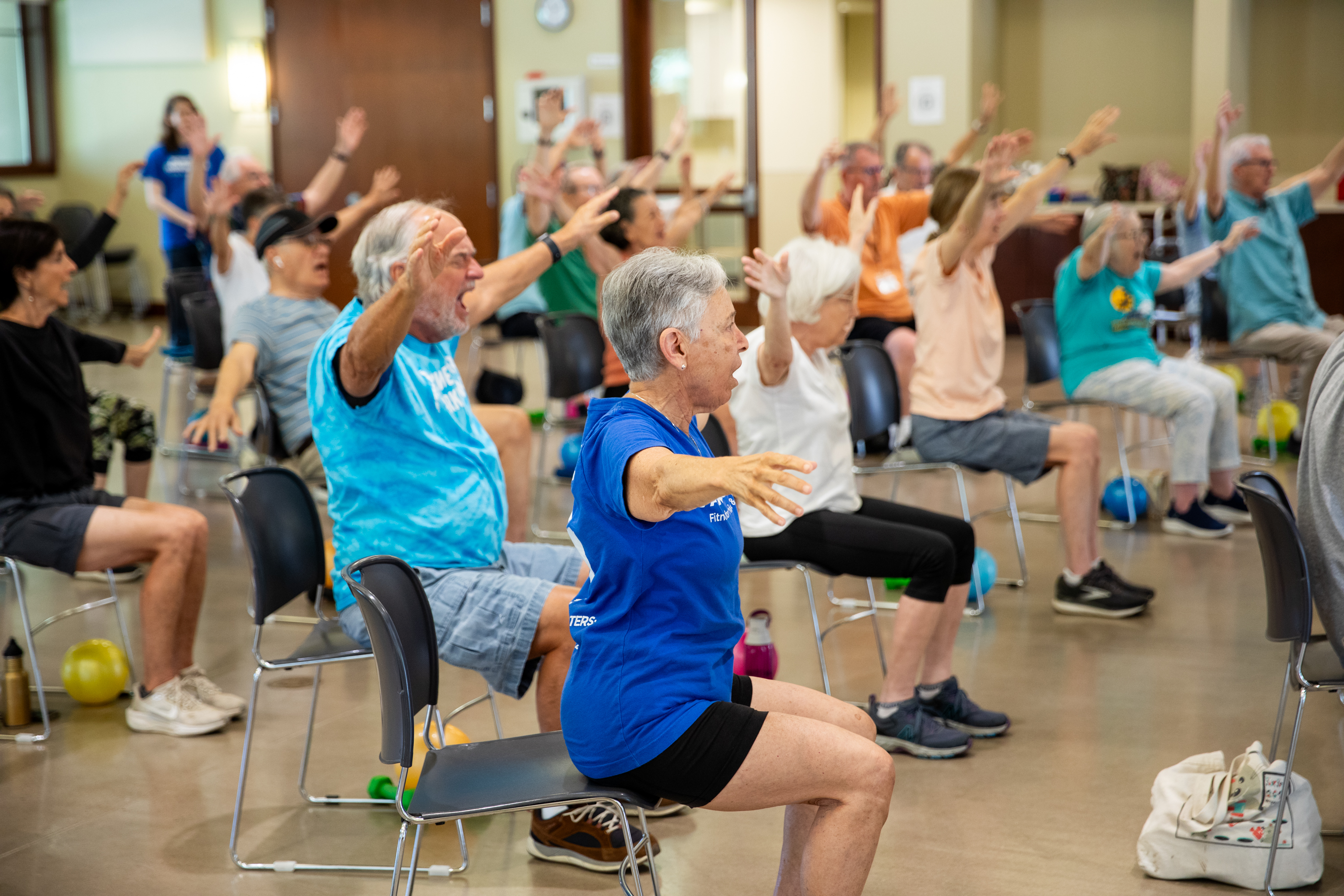
Participants at a Power for Parkinson's exercise class do exercises specifically targeting Parkinson's symptoms.

In improving flexibility and range of motion for people experiencing rigidity, generalized relaxation techniques such as gentle rocking have been found to decrease excessive muscle tension. Other effective techniques to promote relaxation include slow rotational movements of the extremities and trunk, rhythmic initiation, diaphragmatic breathing, and meditation. Deep diaphragmatic breathing may also improve chest-wall mobility and vital capacity decreased by the stooped posture and respiratory dysfunctions of advanced Parkinson's. Rehabilitation techniques targeting gait and the challenges posed by bradykinesia, shuffling, and decreased arm swing include pole walking, treadmill walking, and marching exercises. Long-term physiotherapy (greater than six months) reduces the need for antiparkinsonian medication; multidisciplinary rehabilitation programs combined with physiotherapy can result in reduction in the levodopa-equivalent dose.

Speech therapies such as the Lee Silverman voice treatment may reduce the effect of speech disorders associated with PD. Occupational therapy as a rehabilitation strategy can improve quality of life by enabling people with PD to find engaging activities and communal roles, adapt to their living environment, and improve domestic and work abilities.

=== Diet ===
PD poses digestive problems such as constipation and prolonged emptying of stomach contents, and a balanced diet with periodical nutritional assessments is recommended to avoid weight loss or gain and minimize the consequences of gastrointestinal dysfunction. In particular, a Mediterranean diet is advised and may slow disease progression. As it can compete for uptake with amino acids derived from protein, levodopa should be taken 30 minutes before meals to minimize such competition. Low-protein diets may also be needed by later stages. As the disease advances, swallowing difficulties often arise. Using thickening agents for liquid intake and an upright posture when eating may be useful; both measures reduce the risk of choking. Gastrostomy can be used to deliver food directly into the stomach. Increased water and fiber intakes are used to treat constipation.

=== Palliative care ===
As PD is incurable, palliative care aims to improve the quality of life for both the patient and family by alleviating the symptoms and stress associated with illness. Early integration of palliative care into the disease course is recommended, rather than delaying until later stages. Palliative-care specialists can help with physical symptoms, emotional factors such as loss of function and jobs, depression, and fear, as well as existential concerns. Palliative-care team members also help guide difficult decisions caused by disease progression, such as wishes for a feeding tube, noninvasive ventilator or tracheostomy, use of cardiopulmonary resuscitation, and entering hospice care.

== Prognosis ==
Life expectancy in PD by age of onset and sex

Prognosis of PD subtypes
Parkinson's subtype	Mean years post-diagnosis until:	
Parkinson's subtype	Severe cognitive or movement abnormalities (Note: Defined as the onset of development of recurrent falls, wheelchair dependence, dementia, or facility placement.)	Death
Mild-motor predominant	14.3	20.2
Intermediate	8.2	13.1
Diffuse malignant	3.5	8.1

Because PD has multiple causes and can affect people in different ways, it is hard to predict how it will progress, and prognoses can be highly variable. On average, life expectancy is reduced in those with PD, with younger age of onset resulting in greater life expectancy decreases. Although PD subtype categorization is controversial, the 2017 Parkinson's Progression Markers Initiative study identified three broad scorable subtypes of increasing severity and more rapid progression - mild-motor predominant, intermediate, and diffuse malignant. Mean years of survival after diagnosis were 20.2, 13.1, and 8.1.

Around 30% of individuals with PD develop dementia, which is 12 times more likely to occur in the elderly with severe PD. Dementia is less likely to arise in tremor-dominant PD. Parkinson's disease dementia is associated with a reduced quality of life in people with PD and their caregivers, increased mortality, and a higher probability of needing nursing home care.

The incidence rate of falls is around 45–68%, three times that of healthy individuals, and half of such falls result in serious injuries. Falls increase mortality. Around 90% of those with PD develop hypokinetic dysarthria, which worsens with disease progression and can hinder communication. Over 80% develop difficulty swallowing; consequent inhalation of gastric and oropharyngeal secretions can lead to aspiration pneumonia.

== Epidemiology ==
As of 2024, PD is the second-most common neurodegenerative disease and the fastest growing in total cases. As of 2023, global prevalence was estimated to be 1.51 per 1000. Men are reportedly 1.5 times more likely to have PD than women, but this may vary with different populations. Age plays the biggest role in the risk of getting PD. As global life expectancy has increased, PD prevalence has also risen, with an estimated increase in cases by 74% from 1990 to 2016. However, increased life expectancy does not fully explain this change: when age was accounted for, PD prevalence rates still increased by 21.7% in this time period. The number is predicted to rise to over 12 million by 2040.

This increase may be due to a number of global factors, including prolonged life expectancy, increased industrialisation, and decreased smoking. Although genetics is the sole factor in a minority of cases, most cases of PD are likely a result of gene-environment interactions; concordance studies with twins have found PD heritability to be just 30%. The influence of multiple genetic and environmental factors complicates epidemiological efforts.

Relative to Europe and North America, disease prevalence is lower in Africa, but similar in Latin America. Although China is predicted to have nearly half of the global PD population by 2030, estimates of prevalence in Asia vary. Potential explanations for these geographic differences include genetic variation, environmental factors, health care access, and life expectancy. Although PD incidence and prevalence may vary by race and ethnicity, significant disparities in care, diagnosis, and study participation limit generalizability and lead to conflicting results. Within the United States, high rates of PD have been identified in the Midwest, the South, and agricultural regions of other states, collectively termed the "PD belt". The association between rural residence and PD has been hypothesized to be caused by environmental factors including herbicides, pesticides, and industrial waste.

Death rate from parkinsons disease

Parkinsons disease prevalence

== History ==
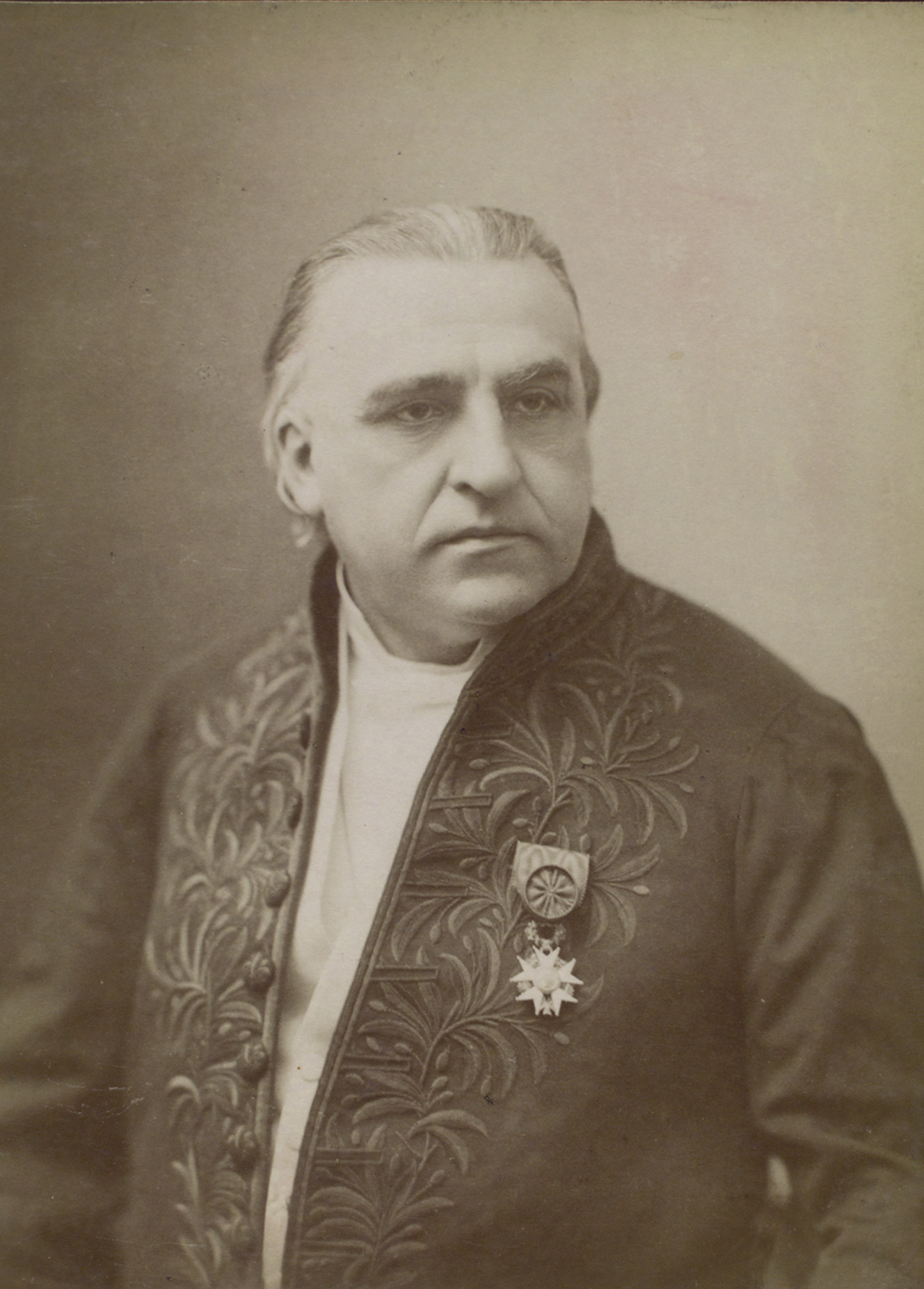
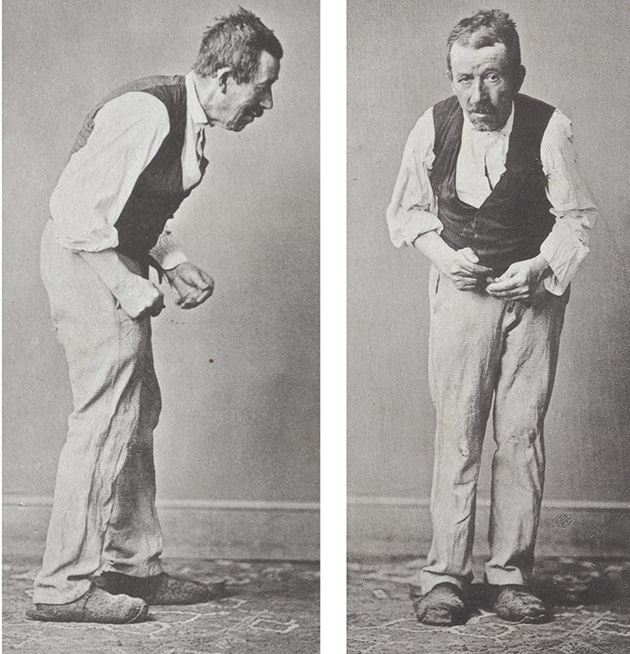
In 1877, Jean-Martin Charcot (left) named Parkinson's disease after the first person to comprehensively describe it, James Parkinson. Patient Pierre D. (right) served as the model for William Gowers' illustration of the disease.

In 1817, English physician James Parkinson published the first full medical description of the disease as a neurological syndrome in his monograph An Essay on the Shaking Palsy. He presented six clinical cases, including three he had observed on the streets near Hoxton Square in London. Parkinson described three cardinal symptoms: tremor, postural instability, and "paralysis" (undistinguished from rigidity or bradykinesia), and speculated that the disease was caused by trauma to the spinal cord.

Little discussion of or investigation into the "shaking palsy" occurred until 1861, when Frenchman Jean-Martin Charcot—regarded as the father of neurology—began expanding Parkinson's description, adding bradykinesia as one of the four cardinal symptoms. In 1877, Charcot renamed the disease after Parkinson, as the tremor suggested by "shaking palsy" is not present in all. Subsequent neurologists who made early advances to the understanding of PD include Armand Trousseau, William Gowers, Samuel Kinnier Wilson, and Wilhelm Erb.

Although Parkinson is typically credited with the first detailed description of PD, many previous texts reference some of the disease's clinical signs. In his essay, Parkinson himself acknowledged partial descriptions by Galen, William Cullen, Johann Juncker, and others. Possible earlier but incomplete descriptions include a Nineteenth Dynasty Egyptian papyrus, the ayurvedic text Charaka Samhita, Ecclesiastes 12:3, and a discussion of tremors by Leonardo da Vinci. Multiple traditional Chinese medicine texts may include references to PD, including a discussion in the Yellow Emperor's Internal Classic (c. 425–221 BC) of a disease with symptoms of tremor, stiffness, staring, and stooped posture. In 2009, a systematic description of PD was found in the Hungarian medical text Pax corporis written by Ferenc Pápai Páriz in 1690, some 120 years before Parkinson. Although Páriz correctly described all four cardinal signs, it was only published in Hungarian and was not widely distributed.

In 1912, Frederic Lewy described microscopic particles in affected brains, later named Lewy bodies. In 1919, Konstantin Tretiakoff reported that the substantia nigra was the main brain structure affected, corroborated by Rolf Hassler in 1938. The underlying changes in dopamine signaling were identified in the 1950s, largely by Arvid Carlsson and Oleh Hornykiewicz. In 1997, Polymeropoulos and colleagues at the NIH discovered the first gene for PD, SNCA, which encodes alpha-synuclein. Alpha-synuclein was, in turn, found to be the main component of Lewy bodies by Spillantini, Trojanowski, Goedert, and others. Anticholinergics and surgery were the only treatments until the use of levodopa, which, although first synthesized by Casimir Funk in 1911, did not enter clinical use until 1967. By the late 1980s, deep brain stimulation introduced by Alim Louis Benabid and colleagues at Grenoble, France, emerged as an additional treatment.

== Society and culture ==
=== Social consequences ===
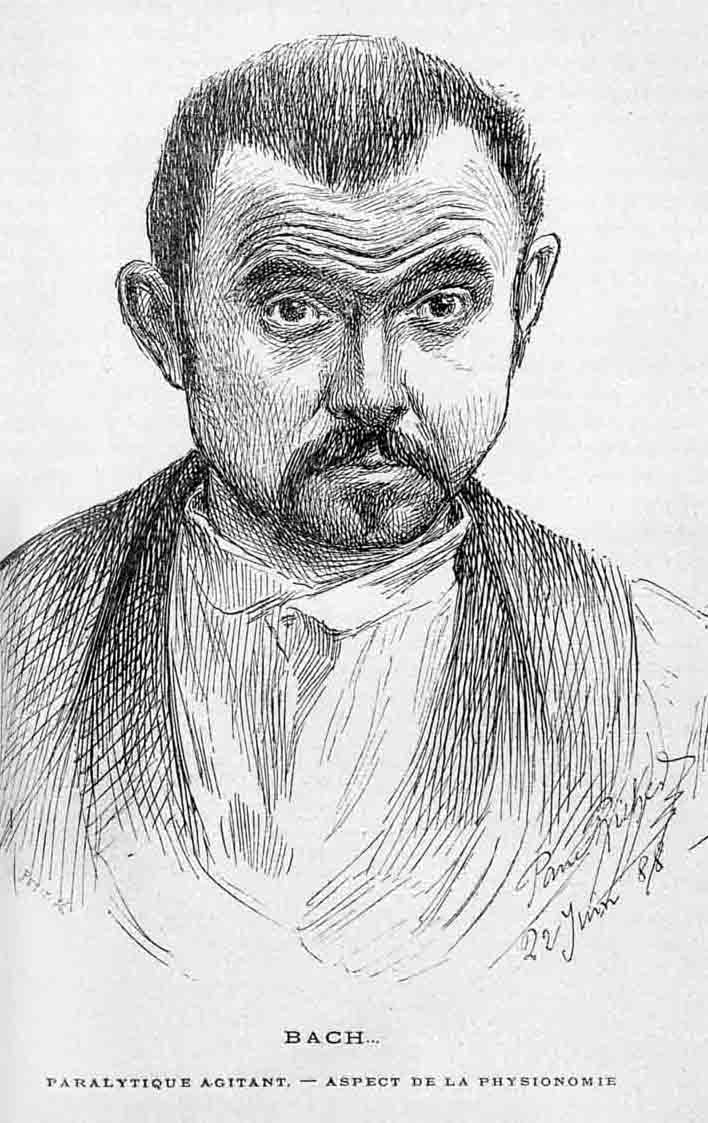
The reduced ability to facially express emotions—as depicted here by French anatomist Paul Richer in 1888—can harm social well-being.

For some people with PD, masked facial expressions and difficulty moderating facial expressions of emotion or recognizing other people's facial expressions can affect social well-being. As the condition progresses, tremor, other motor symptoms, difficulty communicating, or mobility issues may interfere with social engagement, causing individuals with PD to feel isolated. Public perception and awareness of PD symptoms such as shaking, hallucinating, slurring speech, and being off balance is lacking in some countries and can lead to stigma.

=== Cost ===
The economic cost of Parkinson's to both individuals and society is high. In many low- and middle-income countries, public health systems may not fully cover Parkinson's disease therapies, leading to disparities in access to treatment. In contrast, high-income countries with universal healthcare typically cover standard treatments such as levodopa and specialist care. Indirect costs include lifetime earnings losses due to premature death, productivity losses, and caregiver burdens. The duration and progressive nature of PD can place a heavy burden on caregivers; family members, such as spouses, dedicate around 22 hours per week to care.

In 2010, the total economic burden of PD across Europe, including indirect and direct medical costs, was estimated to be €13.9 billion (US$14.9 billion). The total burden in the United States was estimated to be $51.9 billion in 2017, and is projected to surpass $79 billion by 2037. As of 2022, no rigorous economic surveys had been performed for low- or middle-income nations. Preventive care has been identified as crucial to slow the rapidly increasing incidence of Parkinson's from overwhelming national health systems.

=== Advocacy ===
The birthday of James Parkinson, 11 April, has been designated as World Parkinson's Day. A red tulip was chosen by international organizations as the symbol of the disease in 2005; it represents the 'James Parkinson' tulip cultivar, registered in 1981 by a Dutch horticulturalist.

Advocacy organizations include the National Parkinson Foundation, which has provided more than $180 million in care, research, and support services since 1982, Parkinson's Disease Foundation, which has distributed more than $115 million for research and nearly $50 million for education and advocacy programs since its founding in 1957 by William Black; the American Parkinson Disease Association, founded in 1961; and Parkinson's Europe, founded in 1992.

=== Notable cases ===
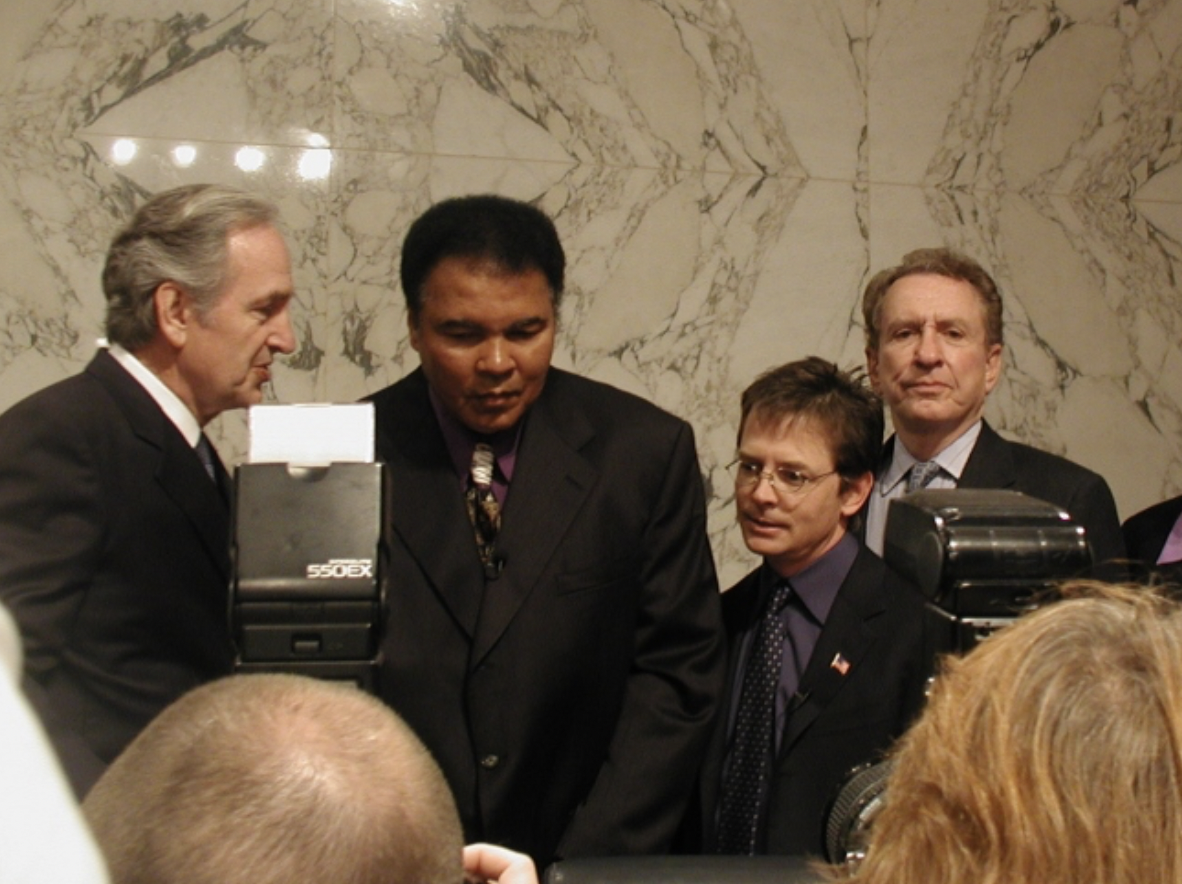
Actor Michael J. Fox and boxer Muhammad Ali (center) are pictured in 2002 speaking before the US Senate to urge increased funding for Parkinson's research.

In the 21st century, the diagnosis of PD among notable figures has increased the public's understanding of the disorder. Actor Michael J. Fox was diagnosed with PD at 29 years old, and has used his diagnosis to increase awareness of the disease. To illustrate the effects of the disease, Fox has appeared without medication in television roles and before the United States Congress. The Michael J. Fox Foundation, which he founded in 2000, has raised over $2 billion for Parkinson's research.

Boxer Muhammad Ali showed signs of PD when he was 38, but was undiagnosed until he was 42; he has been called the "world's most famous Parkinson's patient". Whether he had PD or parkinsonism related to boxing is unresolved. Cyclist and Olympic medalist Davis Phinney, diagnosed with PD at 40, started the Davis Phinney Foundation in 2004 to support PD research.

Musician Ozzy Osbourne was diagnosed with PD; he performed a 5 July 2025, farewell reunion concert with the band he co-founded, Black Sabbath, weeks before his death. The event raised over $190 million, some of which went to Parkinson's disease research.

Adolf Hitler is believed to have had PD, and the condition may have partially influenced his decision-making.

== Clinical research ==
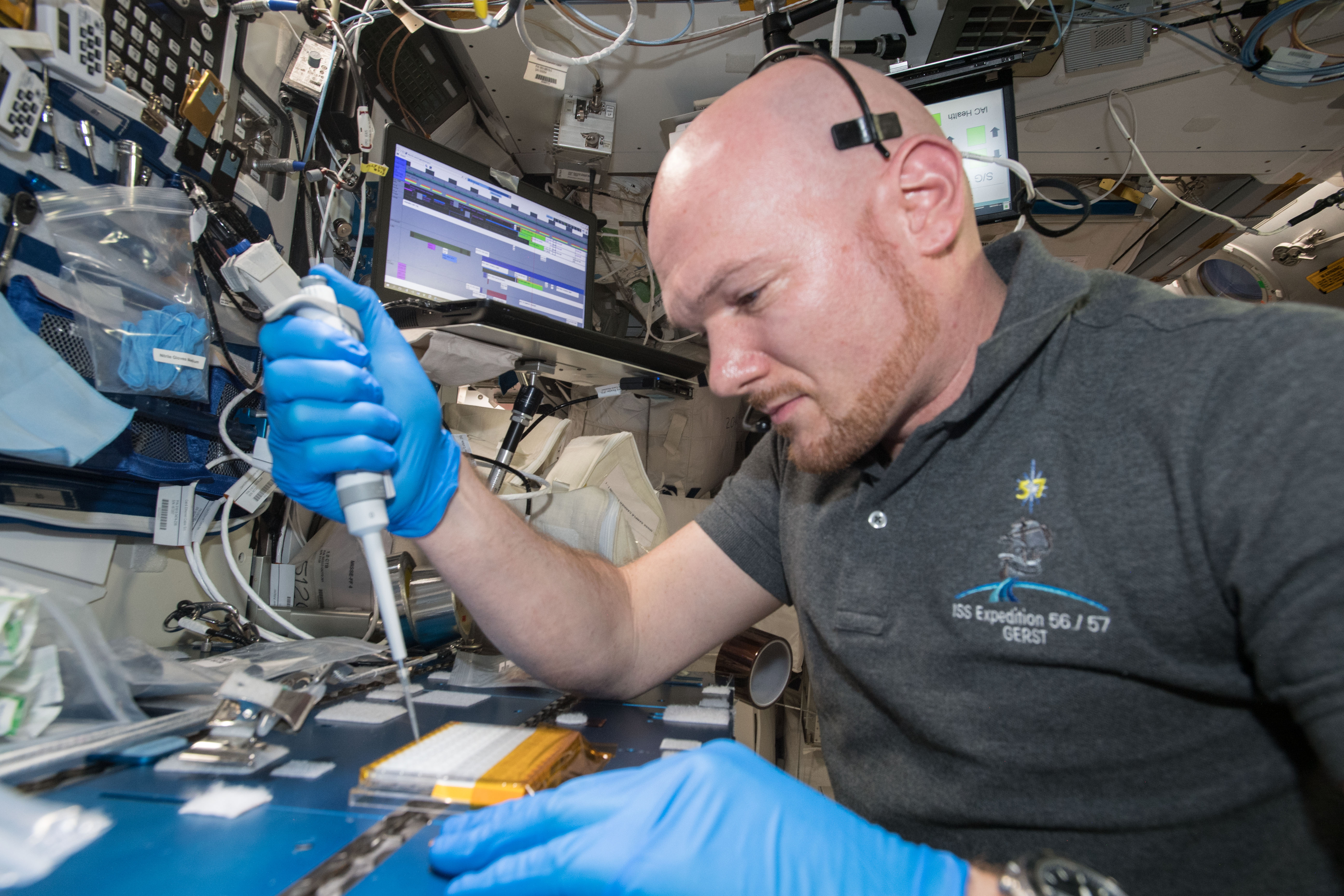
Astronaut Alexander Gerst conducted PD research aboard the International Space Station in 2018.

As of 2024, no disease-modifying therapies exist that reverse or slow the progression of PD. Active research directions include the search for new animal models of the disease and development and trial of gene therapy, stem cell transplants, and neuroprotective agents. Improved treatments will likely combine therapeutic strategies to manage symptoms and enhance outcomes. Reliable biomarkers are needed for early diagnosis, and research criteria for their identification have been established.

=== Neuroprotective treatments ===
Drugs that prevent alpha-synuclein oligomerization and aggregation or promote their clearance are under active investigation, and potential therapeutic strategies include small molecules and immunotherapies including vaccines and monoclonal antibodies. While immunotherapies show promise, their efficacy is often inconsistent. Anti-inflammatory drugs that target NLRP3 and the JAK-STAT signaling pathway offer another potential therapeutic approach.

As the gut microbiome in PD is often disrupted and produces toxic compounds, fecal microbiota transplants might restore a healthy microbiome and alleviate various motor and non-motor symptoms. Neurotrophic factors—peptides that enhance the growth, maturation, and survival of neurons—show modest results, but require invasive surgical administration. Viral vectors may represent a more feasible delivery platform. Calcium channel blockers may restore the calcium imbalance present in PD, and are being investigated as a neuroprotective treatment. Other therapies, such as deferiprone, may reduce the abnormal accumulation of iron in PD.

=== Cell-based therapies ===
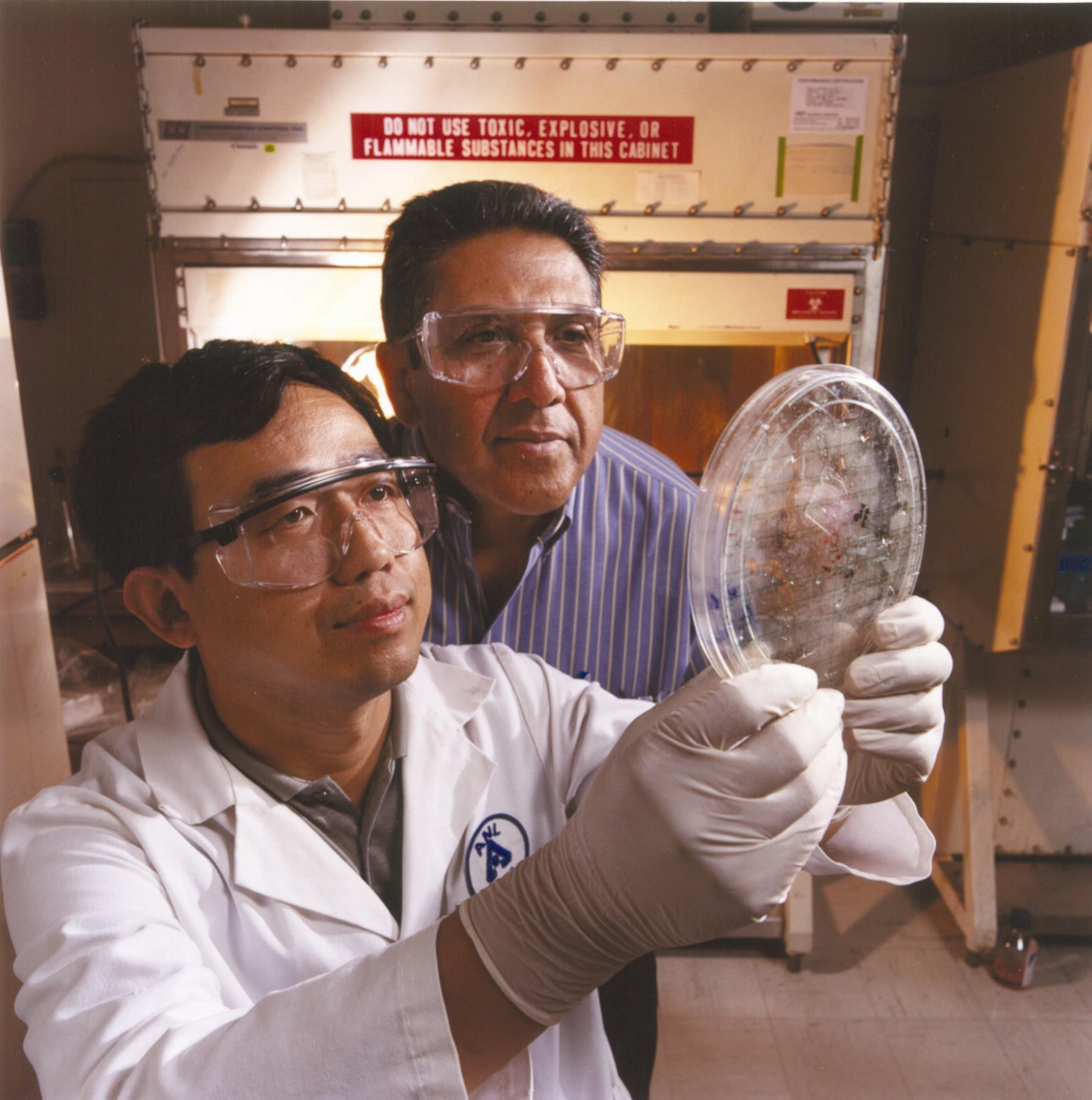
Researchers at Argonne National Laboratory examine induced pluripotent stem cells (iPSCs) for use in Parkinson's and other diseases: the action potentials of one such iPSC differentiated into a dopaminergic neuron are visible at right.

In contrast to other neurodegenerative disorders, many PD symptoms can be attributed to the loss of a single cell type. Consequently, dopaminergic neuron regeneration is a promising therapeutic approach. Although most initial research sought to generate dopaminergic neuron precursor cells from fetal brain tissue, pluripotent stem cells—particularly induced pluripotent stem cells (iPSC)—have become an increasingly popular tissue source.

Both fetal and iPSC-derived DA neurons have been transplanted into patients in clinical trials. Although some individuals have seen improvement, the results are highly variable. Adverse effects, such as dyskinesia arising from excess dopamine release by the transplanted tissues, have also been observed.

=== Gene therapy ===
Gene therapy for PD seeks to restore the healthy function of dopaminergic neurons in the substantia nigra by delivering genetic material—typically through a viral vector—to these diseased cells. This material may deliver a functional, wild-type version of a gene, or knock down a pathological variant. Experimental gene therapies for PD have aimed to increase the expression of growth factors or enzymes involved in dopamine synthesis, such as tyrosine hydroxylase. The one-time delivery of genes circumvents the recurrent invasive administration required to administer some peptides and proteins to the brain. MicroRNAs are an emerging PD gene therapy platform that may serve as an alternative to viral vectors.

== Notes and references ==
=== Works cited ===
==== Books ====
- Batzu L, Podlewska A, Gibson L, et al. (2024). "A general clinical overview of the non-motor symptoms in Parkinson's disease: Neuropsychiatric symptoms". Translational Approaches to Unravelling Non-Motor Symptoms of Parkinson's Disease. International Review of Neurobiology. Vol. 174. pp. 59–97. doi:10.1016/bs.irn.2023.11.001. ISBN 978-0-323-99183-4. PMID 38341232.
- Bhattacharyya KB (2017). "Chapter One – Hallmarks of Clinical Aspects of Parkinson's Disease Through Centuries". In Bhatia KP, Chaudhuri KR, Stamelou M (eds.). Parkinson's Disease. International Review of Neurobiology. pp. 1–23.
- Bernat JL, Beresford R (2013). Ethical and Legal Issues in Neurology. Newnes. ISBN 978-0-444-53504-7.
- Ferri FF (2010). "Chapter P". Ferri's differential diagnosis: a practical guide to the differential diagnosis of symptoms, signs, and clinical disorders (2nd ed.). Elsevier/Mosby. ISBN 978-0-3230-7699-9.
- Lanska DJ (2010). "Chapter 33: The history of movement disorders". Handbook of Clinical Neurology. 3. Vol. 95. History of Neurology. pp. 501–546. doi:10.1016/S0072-9752(08)02133-7. ISBN 978-0-444-52009-8. PMID 19892136.
- O'Sullivan SB, Schmitz TJ (2007). "Parkinson's Disease". Physical Rehabilitation (5th ed.). F.A. Davis. ISBN 978-0-8036-1247-1.
- Simon RP, Greenberg D, Aminoff MJ (2017). Lange Clinical Neurology (10th ed.). McGraw-Hill. ISBN 978-1-2598-6172-7.
- Stoker TB, Greenland JC, eds. (December 2018). Parkinson's Disease: Pathogenesis and Clinical Aspects. Codon Publications. ISBN 978-0-9944-3816-4.
  - Greenland JC, Barker RA (2018). "The Differential Diagnosis of Parkinson's Disease". Parkinson's Disease: Pathogenesis and Clinical Aspects. pp. 109–128. doi:10.15586/codonpublications.parkinsonsdisease.2018.ch6. ISBN 978-0-9944381-6-4. PMID 30702839.
- The National Collaborating Centre for Chronic Conditions, ed. (2006). "Non-motor features of Parkinson's disease". Parkinson's Disease. London: Royal College of Physicians. pp. 113–133. ISBN 978-1-8601-6283-1. Archived from the original on 24 September 2010.

==== Journal articles ====
- Aarslanda D, Krambergera MG (2015). "Neuropsychiatric Symptoms in Parkinson's Disease". Journal of Personalized Medicine. 5 (3): 659–667. doi:10.3233/JPD-150604. PMID 26406147.
- Abusrair AH, Elsekaily W, Bohlega S (13 September 2022). "Tremor in Parkinson's Disease: From Pathophysiology to Advanced Therapies". Tremor and Other Hyperkinetic Movements. 12 (1) 29. doi:10.5334/tohm.712. PMC 9504742. PMID 36211804.
- Ahlskog JE (July 2011). "Does vigorous exercise have a neuroprotective effect in Parkinson disease?". Neurology. 77 (3): 288–294. doi:10.1212/wnl.0b013e318225ab66. PMC 3136051. PMID 21768599.
- Alfaidi M, Barker RA, Kuan W (2024). "An update on immune-based alpha-synuclein trials in Parkinson's disease". Journal of Neurology. 272 (1) 21. doi:10.1007/s00415-024-12770-x. PMC 11638298. PMID 39666171.
- Almikhlafi MA (January 2024). "A review of the gastrointestinal, olfactory, and skin abnormalities in patients with Parkinson's disease". Neurosciences. 29 (1): 4–9. doi:10.17712/nsj.2024.1.20230062. PMC 10827020. PMID 38195133.
- Anwar L, Ahmad E, Imtiaz M, et al. (September 2024). "The Impact of Diet on Parkinson's Disease: A Systematic Review". Cureus. 16 (9) e70337. doi:10.7759/cureus.70337. PMC 11513219. PMID 39469346.
- Armstrong MJ, Okun MS (February 2020). "Diagnosis and Treatment of Parkinson Disease: A Review". JAMA. 323 (6): 548–560. Bibcode:2020JAMA..323..548A. doi:10.1001/jama.2019.22360. PMID 32044947.
- Ascherio A, Schwarzschild MA (2016). "The epidemiology of Parkinson's disease: risk factors and prevention". Lancet Neurology. 15 (12): 1257–1272. doi:10.1016/S1474-4422(16)30230-7. PMID 27751556.
- Atalar MS, Oguz O, Genc G (2023). "Hypokinetic Dysarthria in Parkinson's Disease: A Narrative Review". The Medical Bulletin of Sisle Etfal Hospital. 57 (2): 163–170. doi:10.14744/SEMB.2023.29560. PMC 10600629. PMID 37899809.
- Bandres-Ciga S, Diez-Fairen M, Kim JJ, et al. (April 2020). "Genetics of Parkinson's disease: An introspection of its journey towards precision medicine". Neurobiology of Disease. 137 104782: 1–9. doi:10.1016/j.nbd.2020.104782. PMC 7064061. PMID 31991247.
- Bantounou MA, Shoaib K, Mazzoleni A, et al. (September 2024). "The association between type 2 diabetes mellitus and Parkinson's disease; a systematic review and meta-analysis". Brain Disorders. 15 100158. doi:10.1016/j.dscb.2024.100158.
- Barichella M, Cereda E, Pezzoli G (October 2009). "Major nutritional issues in the management of Parkinson's disease". Movement Disorders. 24 (13): 1881–1892. doi:10.1002/mds.22705. hdl:2434/67795. PMID 19691125.
- Beheshti I (14 May 2025). "Exploring Risk and Protective Factors in Parkinson's Disease". Cells. 14 (10): 710. doi:10.3390/cells14100710. PMC 12110598. PMID 40422213.
- Ben Shaul T, Frenkel D, Gurevich T (19 November 2024). "The Interplay of Stress, Inflammation, and Metabolic Factors in the Course of Parkinson's Disease". International Journal of Molecular Sciences. 25 (22) 12409. doi:10.3390/ijms252212409. PMC 11594997. PMID 39596474.
- Ben-Shlomo Y, Darweesh S, Llibre-Guerra J, et al. (2024). "The epidemiology of Parkinson's disease". The Lancet. 403 (10423): 283–292. doi:10.1016/S0140-6736(23)01419-8. PMC 11123577. PMID 38245248.
- Bereczki D (2010). "The description of all four cardinal signs of Parkinson's disease in a Hungarian medical text published in 1690". Parkinsonism & Related Disorders. 16 (4): 290–293. doi:10.1016/j.parkreldis.2009.11.006. PMID 19948422.
- Bidesi NS, Andersen IV, Windhorst AD, et al. (November 2021). "The role of neuroimaging in Parkinson's disease". Journal of Neurochemistry. 159 (4): 660–689. doi:10.1111/jnc.15516. PMC 9291628. PMID 34532856.
- Biundo R, Weis L, Antonini A (September 2016). "Cognitive decline in Parkinson's disease: the complex picture". npj Parkinson's Disease. 2 (16018) 16018. doi:10.1038/npjparkd.2016.18. PMC 5516581. PMID 28725699.
- Blonder LX (2018). "Historical and cross-cultural perspectives on Parkinson's disease". Journal of Complementary and Integrative Medicine. 15 (3) 20160065: 1–15. doi:10.1515/jcim-2016-0065. PMID 29738310.
- Boettcher L, Bonney P, Smitherman A, et al. (2015). "Hitler's parkinsonism". Neurosurgical Focus. 39 (1): E8. doi:10.3171/2015.4.FOCUS1563. PMID 26126407.
- Bollu PC, Sahota P (2017). "Sleep and Parkinson Disease". Missouri Medicine. 114 (5): 381–386. PMC 6140184. PMID 30228640.
- Bologna M, Paparella G, Fasano A, et al. (December 2019). "Evolving concepts on bradykinesia". Brain. 143 (3): 727–750. doi:10.1093/brain/awz344. PMC 8205506. PMID 31834375.
- Bologna M, Truong D, Jankovic J (2022). "The etiopathogenetic and pathophysiological spectrum of parkinsonism". Journal of the Neurological Sciences. 433 120012: 1–8. doi:10.1016/j.jns.2021.120012. PMID 34642022.
- Boonstra JT, Michielse S, Temel Y, et al. (2020). "Neuroimaging Detectable Differences between Parkinson's Disease Motor Subtypes". Movement Disorders Clinical Practice. 8 (2): 175–192. doi:10.1002/mdc3.13107. PMC 7853198. PMID 33553487.
- Borghammer P (January 2018). "How does parkinson's disease begin? Perspectives on neuroanatomical pathways, prions, and histology". Movement Disorders. 33 (1): 48–57. doi:10.1002/mds.27138. PMID 28843014.
- Borsche M, Pereira SL, Klein C, et al. (February 2021). "Mitochondria and Parkinson's Disease: Clinical, Molecular, and Translational Aspects". Journal of Parkinson's Disease. 11 (1): 45–60. doi:10.3233/JPD-201981. PMC 7990451. PMID 33074190.
- Brey RL (April 2006). "Muhammad Ali's Message: Keep Moving Forward". Neurology Now. 2 (2): 8. doi:10.1097/01222928-200602020-00003 (inactive 15 November 2026). Archived from the original on 27 September 2011.
- Bronstein JM, Tagliati M, Alterman RL, et al. (February 2011). "Deep brain stimulation for Parkinson disease: an expert consensus and review of key issues". Archives of Neurology. 68 (2): 165. doi:10.1001/archneurol.2010.260. PMC 4523130. PMID 20937936.
- Brooks DJ (April 2010). "Imaging approaches to Parkinson disease". Journal of Nuclear Medicine. 51 (4): 596–609. doi:10.2967/jnumed.108.059998. PMID 20351351.
- Brundin P, Melki R (October 2017). "Prying into the Prion Hypothesis for Parkinson's Disease". Journal of Neuroscience. 37 (41): 9808–9818. doi:10.1523/JNEUROSCI.1788-16.2017. PMC 5637113. PMID 29021298.
- Caballol N, Martí MJ, Tolosa E (September 2007). "Cognitive dysfunction and dementia in Parkinson disease". Mov. Disord. 22 (Suppl 17): S358–66. doi:10.1002/mds.21677. PMID 18175397.
- Calabresi P, Mechelli A, Natale G, et al. (2023). "Alpha-synuclein in Parkinson's disease and other synucleinopathies: from overt neurodegeneration back to early synaptic dysfunction". Cell Death & Disease. 14 (3) 176. doi:10.1038/s41419-023-05672-9. PMC 9977911. PMID 36859484.
- Caproni S, Colosimo C (February 2020). "Diagnosis and Differential Diagnosis of Parkinson Disease". Clinical Geriatric Medicine. 36 (1): 13–24. doi:10.1016/j.cger.2019.09.014. PMID 31733693.
- Casey G (August 2013). "Parkinson's disease: a long and difficult journey". Nursing New Zealand. 19 (7): 20–24. PMID 24195263.
- Chen R, Gu X, Wang X (April 2022). "α-Synuclein in Parkinson's disease and advances in detection". Clinica Chimica Acta; International Journal of Clinical Chemistry. 529: 76–86. doi:10.1016/j.cca.2022.02.006. PMID 35176268.
- Chua WY, Wang JD, Chan CK, et al. (September 2024). "Risk of aspiration pneumonia and hospital mortality in Parkinson disease: A systematic review and meta-analysis". European Journal of Neurology. 31 (12) e16449. doi:10.1111/ene.16449. PMC 11555015. PMID 39236309.
- Coffey RJ (2009). "Deep brain stimulation devices: a brief technical history and review". Artificial Organs. 33 (3): 208–220. doi:10.1111/j.1525-1594.2008.00620.x. PMID 18684199.
- Coleman C, Martin I (16 December 2022). "Unraveling Parkinson's Disease Neurodegeneration: Does Aging Hold the Clues?". Journal of Parkinson's Disease. 12 (8): 2321–2338. doi:10.3233/JPD-223363. PMC 9837701. PMID 36278358.
- Connolly BS, Lang AE (April 2014). "Pharmacological treatment of Parkinson disease: a review". JAMA. 311 (16): 1670–1683. doi:10.1001/jama.2014.3654. PMID 24756517.
- Corcoran J, Kluger BM (September 2023). "Prognosis in chronic progressive neurologic disease: a narrative review". Annals of Palliative Medicine. 12 (5): 952–962. doi:10.21037/apm-22-1338. PMID 37691335.
- Corrà MF, Vila-Chã N, Sardoeira A, et al. (January 2023). "Peripheral neuropathy in Parkinson's disease: prevalence and functional impact on gait and balance". Brain. 146 (1): 225–236. doi:10.1093/brain/awac026. PMC 9825570. PMID 35088837.
- Costa V, Prati JM, de Oliveira BS, et al. (November 2024). "Physical Exercise for Treating the Anxiety and Depression Symptoms of Parkinson's Disease: Systematic Review and Meta-Analysis". Journal of Geriatric Psychiatry and Neurology. 37 (6): 415–435. doi:10.1177/08919887241237223. PMID 38445606.
- Crooks S, Carter G, Wilson CB, et al. (2023). "Exploring public perceptions and awareness of Parkinson's disease: A scoping review". PLOS ONE. 18 (9) e0291357. Bibcode:2023PLoSO..1891357C. doi:10.1371/journal.pone.0291357. PMC 10503766. PMID 37713383.
- Crotty GF, Schwarzschild MA (2020). "Chasing Protection in Parkinson's Disease: Does Exercise Reduce Risk and Progression?". Frontiers in Aging Neuroscience. 12 186. doi:10.3389/fnagi.2020.00186. PMC 7318912. PMID 32636740.
- de Bie RM, Clarke CE, Espay AJ, et al. (March 2020). "Initiation of pharmacological therapy in Parkinson's disease: when, why, and how". Lancet Neurology. 19 (5): 452–461. doi:10.1016/S1474-4422(20)30036-3. PMID 32171387.
- Delic V, Beck KD, Pang KC, et al. (April 2020). "Biological links between traumatic brain injury and Parkinson's disease". Acta Neuropathologica Communications. 8 (1) 45. doi:10.1186/s40478-020-00924-7. PMC 7137235. PMID 32264976.
- Deliz JR, Tanner CM, Gonzalez-Latapi P (2024). "Epidemiology of Parkinson's Disease: An Update". Current Neurology and Neuroscience Reports. 24 (6): 163–179. doi:10.1007/s11910-024-01339-w. PMID 38642225.
- De Miranda BR, Goldman SM, Miller GW, et al. (April 2022). "Preventing Parkinson's Disease: An Environmental Agenda". Journal of Parkinson's Disease. 12 (1): 45–68. doi:10.3233/JPD-212922. PMC 8842749. PMID 34719434.
- Dickson DW (January 2018). "Neuropathology of Parkinson disease". Parkinsonism and Related Disorders. 46 (S1): S30–S33. doi:10.1016/j.parkreldis.2017.07.033. PMC 5718208. PMID 28780180.
- Dodet P, Houot M, Leu-Semenescu S, et al. (February 2024). "Sleep disorders in Parkinson's disease, an early and multiple problem". npj Parkinson's Disease. 10 (1) 46. doi:10.1038/s41531-024-00642-0. PMC 10904863. PMID 38424131.
- Dommershuijsen LJ, Darweesh SK, Ben-Shlomo Y, et al. (October 2023). "The elephant in the room: critical reflections on mortality rates among individuals with Parkinson's disease". npj Parkinson's Disease. 9 (1) 145. doi:10.1038/s41531-023-00588-9. PMC 10587193. PMID 37857675.
- Dorsey ER, Bloem BR (January 2024). "Parkinson's Disease Is Predominantly an Environmental Disease". Journal of Parkinson's Disease. 14 (3): 103–115. doi:10.3233/JPD-230357. PMC 11091623. PMID 38217613.
- Dorsey ER, De Miranda BR, Horsager J, et al. (April 2024). "The Body, the Brain, the Environment, and Parkinson's Disease". Journal of Parkinson's Disease. 14 (3): 363–381. doi:10.3233/JPD-240019. PMC 11091648. PMID 38607765.
- Dorsey ER, Sherer T, Okun MS, et al. (2018). "The Emerging Evidence of the Parkinson Pandemic". Journal of Parkinson's Disease. 8 (s1): S3–S8. doi:10.3233/JPD-181474. PMC 6311367. PMID 30584159.
- Elbers RG, Verhoef J, van Wegen EE, et al. (October 2015). "Interventions for fatigue in Parkinson's disease". The Cochrane Database of Systematic Reviews (Review). 2015 (10) CD010925. doi:10.1002/14651858.CD010925.pub2. PMC 9240814. PMID 26447539.
- Ernst M, Folkerts AK, Gollan R, et al. (1 January 2023). "Physical exercise for people with Parkinson's disease: a systematic review and network meta-analysis". The Cochrane Database of Systematic Reviews. 2024 (4) CD013856. doi:10.1002/14651858.CD013856.pub3. PMC 9815433. PMID 38588457.
- Fabbri M, Rascol O, Foltynie T, et al. (2024). "Advantages and Challenges of Platform Trials for Disease Modifying Therapies in Parkinson's Disease". Movement Disorders. 39 (9): 1468–1477. doi:10.1002/mds.29899. PMID 38925541.
- Fahn S (2008). "The history of dopamine and levodopa in the treatment of Parkinson's disease". Movement Disorders. 23 (S3): S497–S508. doi:10.1002/mds.22028. PMID 18781671.
- Fereshtehnejad SM, Zeighami Y, Dagher A, et al. (July 2017). "Clinical criteria for subtyping Parkinson's disease: biomarkers and longitudinal progression". Brain. 140 (7): 1959–1976. doi:10.1093/brain/awx118. PMID 28549077.
- Ferrell B, Connor SR, Cordes A, et al. (June 2007). "The national agenda for quality palliative care: the National Consensus Project and the National Quality Forum". Journal of Pain and Symptom Management. 33 (6): 737–744. doi:10.1016/j.jpainsymman.2007.02.024. PMID 17531914.
- Georgoula M, Ntavaroukas P, Campbell BJ, et al. (31 December 2024). "Review article: the role of epigenetics as an underlying regulator of the immune responses in Parkinson's disease". Epigenetics Reports. 2 (1): 1–14. doi:10.1080/28361512.2024.2401340.
- Ghoche R (December 2012). "The conceptual framework of palliative care applied to advanced Parkinson's disease". Parkinsonism & Related Disorders. 18 (Suppl 3): S2–S5. doi:10.1016/j.parkreldis.2012.06.012. PMID 22771241.
- Goetz CG (2011). "The history of Parkinson's disease: early clinical descriptions and neurological therapies". Cold Spring Harbor Perspectives in Medicine. 1 (1) a008862. doi:10.1101/cshperspect.a008862. PMC 3234454. PMID 22229124.
- Gonzalez-Latapi P, Bayram E, Litvan I, et al. (May 2021). "Cognitive Impairment in Parkinson's Disease: Epidemiology, Clinical Profile, Protective and Risk Factors". Behavioral Sciences. 11 (5): 74. doi:10.3390/bs11050074. PMC 8152515. PMID 34068064.
- Grotewolda N, Albina RL (2024). "Update: Protective and risk factors for Parkinson disease". Parkinsonism and Related Disorders. 125 107026: 1–12. doi:10.1016/j.parkreldis.2024.107026. PMC 11846500. PMID 38879999.
- Gupta R, Kim C, Agarwal N, et al. (2015). "Understanding the Influence of Parkinson Disease on Adolf Hitler's Decision-Making during World War II". World Neurosurgery. 84 (5): 1447–1452. doi:10.1016/j.wneu.2015.06.014. PMID 26093359.
- Guridi J, Lozano AM (1997). "A brief history of pallidotomy". Neurosurgery. 41 (5): 1169–1180. doi:10.1097/00006123-199711000-00029. PMID 9361073.
- Hansen D, Ling H, Lashley T, et al. (April 2019). "Review: Clinical, neuropathological and genetic features of Lewy body dementias". Neuropathology and Applied Neurobiology. 45 (7): 635–654. doi:10.1111/nan.12554. PMID 30977926.
- Heim B, Krismer F, De Marzi R, et al. (August 2017). "Magnetic resonance imaging for the diagnosis of Parkinson's disease". Journal of Neural Transmission. 124 (8): 915–964. doi:10.1007/s00702-017-1717-8. PMC 5514207. PMID 28378231.
- Heinzel S, Berg D, Gasser T, et al. (October 2019). "Update of the MDS research criteria for prodromal Parkinson's disease". Movement Disorders. 34 (10): 1464–1470. doi:10.1002/mds.27802. PMID 31412427.
- Henchcliffe C, Parmar M (2018). "Repairing the Brain: Cell Replacement Using Stem Cell-Based Technologies". Journal of Parkinson's Disease. 8 (s1): S131–S137. doi:10.3233/JPD-181488. PMC 6311366. PMID 30584166.
- Henderson MX, Trojanowski JQ, Lee VM (September 2019). "α-Synuclein pathology in Parkinson's disease and related α-synucleinopathies". Neuroscience Letters. 709 134316: 1–10. doi:10.1016/j.neulet.2019.134316. PMC 7014913. PMID 31170426.
- Hitti FL, Yang AI, Gonzalez-Alegre P, et al. (September 2019). "Human gene therapy approaches for the treatment of Parkinson's disease: An overview of current and completed clinical trials". Parkinsonism & Related Disorders. 66: 16–24. doi:10.1016/j.parkreldis.2019.07.018. PMID 31324556.
- Jasutkar HG, Oh SE, Mouradian MM (January 2022). "Therapeutics in the Pipeline Targeting α-Synuclein for Parkinson's Disease". Pharmacological Reviews. 74 (1): 207–237. doi:10.1124/pharmrev.120.000133. PMC 11034868. PMID 35017177.
- Jing X, Yang H, Taximaimaiti R, et al. (2023). "Advances in the Therapeutic Use of Non-Ergot Dopamine Agonists in the Treatment of Motor and Non-Motor Symptoms of Parkinson's Disease". Current Neuropharmacology. 21 (5): 1224–1240. doi:10.2174/1570159X20666220915091022. PMC 10286583. PMID 36111769.
- Kobylecki C (July 2020). "Update on the diagnosis and management of Parkinson's disease". Clinical Medicine. 20 (4): 393–398. doi:10.7861/clinmed.2020-0220. PMC 7385761. PMID 32675145.
- Koh J, Ito H (January 2017). "Differential diagnosis of Parkinson's disease and other neurodegenerative disorders". Nihon Rinsho. Japanese Journal of Clinical Medicine. 75 (1): 56–62. PMID 30566295.
- Langeskov-Christensen M, Franzén E, Grøndahl Hvid L, et al. (16 October 2024). "Exercise as medicine in Parkinson's disease". Journal of Neurology, Neurosurgery, and Psychiatry. 95 (11): 1077–1088. doi:10.1136/jnnp-2023-332974. PMID 38418216.
- Langston JW (March 2017). "The MPTP Story". Journal of Parkinson's Disease. 7 (1): S11–S19. doi:10.3233/JPD-179006. PMC 5345642. PMID 28282815.
- Lappin JM (April 2025). "Rare but relevant: Methamphetamine and Parkinson's disease". Addiction. 120 (4): 797–800. doi:10.1111/add.16695. PMID 39434702.
- Lau K, Kotzur R, Richter F (29 July 2024). "Blood–brain barrier alterations and their impact on Parkinson's disease pathogenesis and therapy". Translational Neurodegeneration. 13 (1): 37. doi:10.1186/s40035-024-00430-z. ISSN 2047-9158. PMC 11285262. PMID 39075566.
- Lees AJ (2007). "Unresolved issues relating to the shaking palsy on the celebration of James Parkinson's 250th birthday". Movement Disorders. 22 (S17): S327–S334. doi:10.1002/mds.21684. PMID 18175393.
- Leta V, Urso D, Batzu L, et al. (2022). "Viruses, parkinsonism and Parkinson's disease: the past, present and future". Journal of Neural Transmission. 129 (9): 1119–1132. doi:10.1007/s00702-022-02536-y. PMC 9422946. PMID 36036863.
- Leta V, Klingelhoefer L, Longardner K, et al. (May 2023). "Gastrointestinal barriers to levodopa transport and absorption in Parkinson's disease". European Journal of Neurology. 30 (5): 1465–1480. doi:10.1111/ene.15734. hdl:11577/3511466. PMID 36757008.
- Lewis PA, Plun-Favreau H, Rowley M, et al. (2020). "Pierre D. and the first photographs of Parkinson's disease". Movement Disorders. 35 (3): 389–391. doi:10.1002/mds.27965. PMC 7155099. PMID 31975439.
- LeWitt PA, Fahn S (April 2016). "Levodopa therapy for Parkinson disease: A look backward and forward". Neurology. 86 (14): S3–S12. doi:10.1212/WNL.0000000000002509. PMID 27044648.
- Li G, Ma J, Cui S, et al. (2019). "Parkinson's disease in China: a forty-year growing track of bedside work". Translational Neurodegeneration. 8 (1) 22. doi:10.1186/s40035-019-0162-z. PMC 6668186. PMID 31384434.
- Li T, Le W (February 2020). "Biomarkers for Parkinson's Disease: How Good Are They?". Neuroscience Bulletin. 36 (2): 183–194. doi:10.1007/s12264-019-00433-1. PMC 6977795. PMID 31646434.
- Lieberman A (April 1996). "Adolf Hitler had post-encephalitic Parkinsonism". Parkinsonism & Related Disorders. 2 (2): 95–103. doi:10.1016/1353-8020(96)00005-3. PMID 18591024.
- Limousin P, Foltynie T (April 2019). "Long-term outcomes of deep brain stimulation in Parkinson disease". Nature Reviews Neurology. 14 (4): 234–242. doi:10.1038/s41582-019-0145-9. PMID 30778210.
- Lin J, Pang D, Li C, et al. (2024). "Calcium channel blockers and Parkinson's disease: a systematic review and meta-analysis". Therapeutic Advances in Neurological Disorders. 17 17562864241252713: 1–8. doi:10.1177/17562864241252713. PMC 11104025. PMID 38770432.
- Lister T (May 2020). "Nutrition and Lifestyle Interventions for Managing Parkinson's Disease: A Narrative Review". Journal of Movement Disorders. 13 (2): 97–104. doi:10.14802/jmd.20006. PMC 7280935. PMID 32498495.
- Liu T, Li J, Wu H, et al. (10 June 2025). "Unraveling Parkinson's disease: The mystery of mitochondria and the role of aging". Genes & Diseases. 13 (2) 101719. doi:10.1016/j.gendis.2025.101719. PMC 12719679. PMID 41439139.
- Lozano CS, Tam J, Lozano AM (January 2018). "The changing landscape of surgery for Parkinson's Disease". Movement Disorders. 33 (1): 36–47. doi:10.1002/mds.27228. PMID 29194808.
- Louis ED (1997). "The shaking palsy, the first forty-five years: a journey through the British literature". Movement Disorders. 12 (6): 1068–1072. doi:10.1002/mds.870120638. PMID 9399240.
- Matthews W (April 2006). "Ali's Fighting Spirit". Neurology Now. 2 (2): 10–23. S2CID 181104230.
- McDonnell MN, Rischbieth B, Schammer TT, et al. (May 2018). "Lee Silverman Voice Treatment (LSVT)-BIG to improve motor function in people with Parkinson's disease: a systematic review and meta-analysis". Clinical Rehabilitation. 32 (5): 607–618. doi:10.1177/0269215517734385. PMID 28980476.
- Menšíková K, Matěj R, Colosimo C, et al. (January 2022). "Lewy body disease or diseases with Lewy bodies?". npj Parkinson's Disease. 8 (1) 3. doi:10.1038/s41531-021-00273-9. PMC 8748648. PMID 35013341.
- Morris HR, Spillantini MG, Sue CM, et al. (January 2024). "The pathogenesis of Parkinson's disease". Lancet. 403 (10423): 293–304. doi:10.1016/s0140-6736(23)01478-2. PMID 38245249.
- Moustafa AA, Chakravarthy S, Phillips JR, et al. (September 2016). "Motor symptoms in Parkinson's disease: A unified framework". Neuroscience & Biobehavioral Reviews. 68: 727–740. doi:10.1016/j.neubiorev.2016.07.010. PMID 27422450.
- Mirelman A, Bonato P, Camicioli R, et al. (April 2019). "Gait impairments in Parkinson's disease". Lancet Neurology. 17 (7): 697–708. doi:10.1016/S1474-4422(19)30044-4. PMID 30975519.
- Moosa S, Martínez-Fernández R, Elias WJ, et al. (September 2019). "The role of high-intensity focused ultrasound as a symptomatic treatment for Parkinson's disease". Movement Disorders. 34 (9): 1243–1251. doi:10.1002/mds.27779. PMID 31291491.
- Murueta-Goyena A, Muiño O, Gómez-Esteban JC (April 2024). "Prognostic factors for falls in Parkinson's disease: a systematic review". Acta Neurologica Belgica. 124 (2): 395–406. doi:10.1007/s13760-023-02428-2. PMC 10965733. PMID 38015306.
- Murueta-Goyena A, Muiño O, Gómez-Esteban JC (March 2017). "Dementia in Parkinson's disease". Journal of the Neurological Sciences. 374: 26–31. doi:10.1016/j.jns.2017.01.012. PMID 28088312.
- Nemzer B, Al-Taher F, Abshiru N, et al. (16 December 2025). "Coffee and Coffee By-Products as Multifunctional Foods and Ingredients". Annual Review of Food Science and Technology. 17 (1): 133–154. doi:10.1146/annurev-food-052924-114847. PMID 41401514.
- Niemann N, Billnitzer A, Jankovic J (January 2021). "Parkinson's disease and skin". Parkinsonism & Related Disorders. 82: 61–76. doi:10.1016/j.parkreldis.2020.11.017. PMID 33248395.
- Okada Y, Ohtsuka H, Kamata N, et al. (2021). "Effectiveness of Long-Term Physiotherapy in Parkinson's Disease: A Systematic Review and Meta-Analysis". J Parkinsons Dis. 11 (4): 1619–1630. doi:10.3233/JPD-212782. PMC 8609713. PMID 34366377.
- Olfatia N, Shoeibia A, Litvanb I (2019). "Progress in the treatment of Parkinson-Plus syndromes". Parkinsonism & Related Disorders. 59: 101–110. doi:10.1016/j.parkreldis.2018.10.006. PMID 30314846.
- Osborne JA, Botkin R, Colon-Semenza C, et al. (April 2022). "Physical Therapist Management of Parkinson Disease: A Clinical Practice Guideline From the American Physical Therapy Association". Phys Ther. 102 (4) pzab302. doi:10.1093/ptj/pzab302. PMC 9046970. PMID 34963139.
- Palakurthi B, Burugupally SP (September 2019). "Postural Instability in Parkinson's Disease: A Review". Brain Sciences. 9 (239): 239. doi:10.3390/brainsci9090239. PMC 6770017. PMID 31540441.
- Palma JA, Kaufmann H (March 2018). "Treatment of autonomic dysfunction in Parkinson disease and other synucleinopathies". Movement Disorders. 33 (3): 372–390. doi:10.1002/mds.27344. PMC 5844369. PMID 29508455.
- Palma JA, Kaufmann H (February 2020). "Orthostatic Hypotension in Parkinson Disease". Clin Geriatr Med. 36 (1): 53–67. doi:10.1016/j.cger.2019.09.002. PMC 7029426. PMID 31733702.
- Pardo-Moreno T, García-Morales V, Suleiman-Martos S, et al. (February 2023). "Current Treatments and New, Tentative Therapies for Parkinson's Disease". Pharmaceutics. 15 (3): 770. doi:10.3390/pharmaceutics15030770. hdl:10481/81647. PMC 10051786. PMID 36986631.
- Parmar M, Grealish S, Henchcliffe C (February 2020). "The future of stem cell therapies for Parkinson disease". Nature Reviews. Neuroscience. 21 (2): 103–115. doi:10.1038/s41583-019-0257-7. PMID 31907406.
- Pfeiffer RF (October 2020). "Autonomic Dysfunction in Parkinson's Disease". Neurotherapeutics. 17 (4): 1464–1479. doi:10.1007/s13311-020-00897-4. PMC 7851208. PMID 32789741.
- Pasricha TS, Guerrero-Lopez IL, Kuo B (March 2024). "Management of Gastrointestinal Symptoms in Parkinson's Disease: A Comprehensive Review of Clinical Presentation, Workup, and Treatment". Movement Disorders. 58 (3): 211–220. doi:10.1097/MCG.0000000000001961. PMC 10855995. PMID 38260966.
- Peña-Zelayeta L, Delgado-Minjares KM, Villegas-Rojas MM, et al. (26 April 2025). "Redefining Non-Motor Symptoms in Parkinson's Disease". Journal of Personalized Medicine. 15 (5): 172. doi:10.3390/jpm15050172. PMC 12112995. PMID 40423044.
- Poewe W, Seppi K, Tanner CM, et al. (March 2017). "Parkinson disease". Nature Reviews. Disease Primers. 3 (1) 17013. doi:10.1038/nrdp.2017.13. PMID 28332488.
- Polymeropoulos MH, Lavedan C, Leroy E, et al. (June 1997). "Mutation in the alpha-synuclein gene identified in families with Parkinson's disease". Science. 276 (5321): 2045–2047. Bibcode:1997Sci...276.2045P. doi:10.1126/science.276.5321.2045. PMID 9197268.
- Prajjwal P, Kolanu ND, Reddy YB, et al. (2024). "Association of Parkinson's disease to Parkinson's plus syndromes, Lewy body dementia, and Alzheimer's dementia". Health Science Reports. 7 (4) e2019. doi:10.1002/hsr2.2019. PMC 10982460. PMID 38562616.
- Prenger MT, Madray R, Van Hedger K, et al. (2020). "Social Symptoms of Parkinson's Disease". Parkinson's Disease. 2020 8846544. doi:10.1155/2020/8846544. PMC 7790585. PMID 33489081.
- Ramazzina I, Bernazzoli B, Costantino C (March 2017). "Systematic review on strength training in Parkinson's disease: an unsolved question". Clinical Interventions in Aging. 12: 619–628. doi:10.2147/CIA.S131903. PMC 5384725. PMID 28408811.
- Ramesh SD, Arachchige AS (2023). "Depletion of dopamine in Parkinson's disease and relevant therapeutic options: A review of the literature". AIMS Neuroscience. 10 (3): 200–231. doi:10.3934/Neuroscience.2023017. PMC 10567584. PMID 37841347.
- Rietdijk CD, Perez-Pardo P, Garssen J, et al. (February 2017). "Exploring Braak's Hypothesis of Parkinson's Disease". Frontiers in Neurology. 8: 37. doi:10.3389/fneur.2017.00037. PMC 5304413. PMID 28243222.
- Rizzo G, Copetti M, Arcuti S, et al. (February 2016). "Accuracy of clinical diagnosis of Parkinson disease: A systematic review and meta-analysis". Neurology. 86 (6): 566–576. doi:10.1212/WNL.0000000000002350. PMID 26764028.
- Robakis D, Fahn S (June 2015). "Defining the Role of the Monoamine Oxidase-B Inhibitors for Parkinson's Disease". CNS Drugs. 29 (6): 433–441. doi:10.1007/s40263-015-0249-8. PMID 26164425.
- Rose KN, Schwarzschild MS, Gomperts SN (2024). "Clearing the Smoke: What Protects Smokers from Parkinson's Disease?". Movement Disorders. 39 (2): 267–272. doi:10.1002/mds.29707. PMC 10923097. PMID 38226487.
- Sakowski SA, Koubek EJ, Chen KS, et al. (April 2024). "Role of the Exposome in Neurodegenerative Disease: Recent Insights and Future Directions". Annals of Neurology. 95 (4): 635–652. doi:10.1002/ana.26897. PMC 11023772. PMID 38411261.
- Salles PA, Tirapegui JM, Chaná-Cuevas P (22 March 2024). "Genetics of Parkinson's disease: Dominant forms and GBA". Neurology Perspectives. 4 (3) 100153. doi:10.1016/j.neurop.2024.100153.
- Schiess N, Cataldi R, Okun MS, et al. (September 2022). "Six Action Steps to Address Global Disparities in Parkinson Disease: A World Health Organization Priority" (PDF). JAMA. 79 (9): 929–936. doi:10.1001/jamaneurol.2022.1783. hdl:10576/33335. PMID 35816299.
- Schulz-Schaeffer WJ (2010). "The synaptic pathology of alpha-synuclein aggregation in dementia with Lewy bodies, Parkinson's disease and Parkinson's disease dementia". Acta Neuropathologica. 120 (2): 131–143. doi:10.1007/s00401-010-0711-0. PMC 2892607. PMID 20563819.
- Schweitzer JS, Song B, Herrington TM, et al. (May 2020). "Personalized iPSC-Derived Dopamine Progenitor Cells for Parkinson's Disease". The New England Journal of Medicine. 382 (20): 1926–1932. doi:10.1056/NEJMoa1915872. PMC 7288982. PMID 32402162.
- Seppi K, Ray Chaudhuri K, Coelho M, et al. (February 2019). "Update on treatments for nonmotor symptoms of Parkinson's disease—an evidence-based medicine review". Movement Disorders. 34 (2): 180–198. doi:10.1002/mds.27602. PMC 6916382. PMID 30653247.
- Shaheen N, Shaheen A, Osama M, et al. (October 2024). "MicroRNAs regulation in Parkinson's disease, and their potential role as diagnostic and therapeutic targets". npj Parkinson's Disease. 10 (3) 186. doi:10.1038/s41531-024-00791-2. PMC 11455891. PMID 39369002.
- Siddiqi S, Ortiz Z, Simard S, et al. (7 March 2025). "Race and ethnicity matter! Moving Parkinson's risk research towards diversity and inclusiveness". npj Parkinson's Disease. 11 (1): 45. doi:10.1038/s41531-025-00891-7. PMC 11885646. PMID 40050644.
- Singh A, Tripathi P, Singh S (2021). "Neuroinflammatory responses in Parkinson's disease: relevance of Ibuprofen in therapeutics". Inflammopharmacology. 29 (1): 5–14. doi:10.1007/s10787-020-00764-w. PMID 33052479.
- Sousa-Santos PE, Pozzobon PM, Teixeira IL (2024). "Frederic Lewy: how the two World Wars changed his life, work, and name". Arquivos de Neuro-Psiquiatri. 82 (3): 001–002. doi:10.1055/s-0044-1779692. PMC 10927365. PMID 38467394.
- Stefani A, Högl B (January 2020). "Sleep in Parkinson's disease". Neuropsychopharmacology. 45 (1): 121–128. doi:10.1038/s41386-019-0448-y. PMC 6879568. PMID 31234200.
- Suwijn SR, van Boheemen CJ, de Haan RJ, et al. (2015). "The diagnostic accuracy of dopamine transporter SPECT imaging to detect nigrostriatal cell loss in patients with Parkinson's disease or clinically uncertain parkinsonism: a systematic review". EJNMMI Research. 5 12. doi:10.1186/s13550-015-0087-1. PMC 4385258. PMID 25853018.
- Sveinbjornsdottir S (October 2016). "The clinical symptoms of Parkinson's disease". Journal of Neurochemistry. 139 (Suppl 1): 318–324. Bibcode:2016JNeur.139..318S. doi:10.1111/jnc.13691. PMID 27401947.
- Tambasco N, Romoli M, Calabresi P (October 2018). "Levodopa in Parkinson's Disease: Current Status and Future Developments". Current Neuropharmacology. 16 (8): 1239–1252. doi:10.2174/1570159X15666170510143821. PMC 6187751. PMID 28494719.
- Tan E, Chao Y, West A, et al. (April 2020). "Parkinson disease and the immune system - associations, mechanisms and therapeutics". Nature Reviews Neurology. 16 (6): 303–318. doi:10.1038/s41582-020-0344-4. PMID 32332985.
- Tanner CM, Ostrem JL (August 2024). "Parkinson's Disease". New England Journal of Medicine. 391 (5): 442–452. doi:10.1056/NEJMra2401857. PMID 39083773.
- Tofani M, Ranieri A, Fabbrini G, et al. (October 2020). "Efﬁcacy of Occupational Therapy Interventions on Quality of Life in Patients with Parkinson's Disease: A Systematic Review and Meta-Analysis". Movement Disorders. 7 (8): 891–901. doi:10.1002/mdc3.13089. PMC 7604677. PMID 33163559.
- Toffoli M, Vieira SR, Schapira AH (June 2020). "Genetic causes of PD: A pathway to disease modification". Neuropharmacology. 170 108022: 1–13. doi:10.1016/j.neuropharm.2020.108022. PMID 32119885.
- Tolosa E, Garrido A, Scholz SW, et al. (May 2021). "Challenges in the diagnosis of Parkinson's disease". Lancet Neurology. 20 (5): 385–397. doi:10.1016/S1474-4422(21)00030-2. PMC 8185633. PMID 33894193.
- Tumas V, Aureliano MJ, Rieder C, et al. (March 2025). "Modifiable risk factors associated with the risk of developing Parkinson's disease: a critical review". Arquivos de Neuro-psiquiatria. 83 (3): 001–010. doi:10.1055/s-0045-1805075. PMC 11922612. PMID 40107260.
- Ugrumov M (June 2020). "Development of early diagnosis of Parkinson's disease: Illusion or reality?". CNS Neuroscience & Therapeutics. 26 (10): 997–1009. doi:10.1111/cns.13429. PMC 7539842. PMID 32597012.
- Van Laar AD, Van Laar VS, San Sebastian W, et al. (2021). "An Update on Gene Therapy Approaches for Parkinson's Disease: Restoration of Dopaminergic Function". Journal of Parkinson's Disease. 11 (S2): S173–S182. doi:10.3233/JPD-212724. PMC 8543243. PMID 34366374.
- Varden R, Walker R, O'Callaghan A (2024). "No trend to rising rates: A review of Parkinson's prevalence studies in the United Kingdom". Parkinsonism & Related Disorders. 128 107015: 1–6. doi:10.1016/j.parkreldis.2024.107015. PMID 38876845.
- Vázquez-Vélez GE, Zoghbi HY (July 2021). "Parkinson's Disease Genetics and Pathophysiology". Annual Review of Neuroscience. 44: 87–108. doi:10.1146/annurev-neuro-100720-034518. PMID 34236893.
- Vincent B, Shukla M (2024). "The Common Denominators of Parkinson's Disease Pathogenesis and Methamphetamine Abuse". Current Neuropharmacology. 22 (13): 2113–2156. doi:10.2174/1570159X21666230907151226. PMC 11337683. PMID 37691228.
- Wallace ER, Segerstrom SC, van Horne CG, et al. (2022). "Meta-Analysis of Cognition in Parkinson's Disease Mild Cognitive Impairment and Dementia Progression". Neuropsychology Review. 32 (1): 149–160. doi:10.1007/s11065-021-09502-7. PMID 33860906.
- Weil RS, Schrag AE, Warren JD, et al. (July 2016). "Visual dysfunction in Parkinson's disease". Brain. 146 (139): 2827–2843. doi:10.1093/brain/aww175. PMC 5091042. PMID 27412389.
- Weintraub D, Mamikonyan E (September 2019). "The Neuropsychiatry of Parkinson Disease: A Perfect Storm". Am J Geriatr Psychiatry. 27 (9): 998–1018. doi:10.1016/j.jagp.2019.03.002. PMC 7015280. PMID 31006550.
- Wilcox SK (January 2010). "Extending palliative care to patients with Parkinson's disease". British Journal of Hospital Medicine. 71 (1): 26–30. doi:10.12968/hmed.2010.71.1.45969. PMID 20081638.
- Wu S, Schekman RW (September 2024). "Intercellular transmission of alpha-synuclein". Frontiers in Molecular Neuroscience. 17 1470171: 1–12. doi:10.3389/fnmol.2024.1470171. PMC 11422390. PMID 39324117.
- Yang W, Hamilton JL, Kopil C, et al. (July 2020). "Current and projected future economic burden of Parkinson's disease in the U.S." npj Parkinson's Disease. 6 15. doi:10.1038/s41531-020-0117-1. PMC 7347582. PMID 32665974.
- Ye Q, Wen Y, Al-Kuwari N, et al. (2020). "Association Between Parkinson's Disease and Melanoma: Putting the Pieces Together". Frontiers in Aging Neuroscience. 12 60. doi:10.3389/fnagi.2020.00060. PMC 7076116. PMID 32210791.
- Ye H, Robak LA, Yu M, et al. (January 2023). "Genetics and Pathogenesis of Parkinson's Syndrome". Annual Review of Pathology: Mechanisms of Disease. 18: 95–121. doi:10.1146/annurev-pathmechdis-031521-034145. PMC 10290758. PMID 36100231.
- Zhu J, Cui Y, Zhang J, et al. (2024). "Temporal trends in the prevalence of Parkinson's disease from 1980 to 2023: A systematic review and meta-analysis". The Lancet Healthy Longevity. 5 (7): e464–e479. doi:10.1016/S2666-7568(24)00094-1. PMID 38945129.
- Zhu M, Li M, Ye D, et al. (March 2016). "Sensory symptoms in Parkinson's disease: Clinical features, pathophysiology, and treatment". Journal of Neuroscience Research. 94 (8): 685–692. doi:10.1002/jnr.23729. PMID 26948282.

==== Web sources ====
- "Our history". Parkinson's Europe. 2026.
- "About PDF". Parkinson's Disease Foundation. Archived from the original on 15 May 2011.
- "American Parkinson Disease Association: Home". American Parkinson Disease Association. Archived from the original on 10 May 2012.
- Macur J (26 March 2008). "For the Phinney Family, a Dream and a Challenge". The New York Times. Archived from the original on 6 November 2014. "About 1.5 million Americans have received a diagnosis of Parkinson's disease, but only 5 to 10 percent learn of it before age 40, according to the National Parkinson Foundation. Davis Phinney was among the few."
- "Michael's Story". The Michael J. Fox Foundation for Parkinson's Research.
- "National Parkinson Foundation – Mission". Archived from the original on 21 December 2010.
- "Notable Figures with Parkinson's". Parkinson's Foundation.
- "Parkinson's Disease". National Institute of Neurological Disorders and Stroke.
- "Parkinson's – 'the shaking palsy'". GlaxoSmithKline. 1 April 2009. Archived from the original on 14 May 2011.
- "Symptoms of PD". Stanford Parkinson's Community Outreach. Stanford University School Medicine.
- "Who We Are". Davis Phinney Foundation. Archived from the original on 11 January 2012.

==== News publications ====
- Brockes E (11 April 2009). "'It's the gift that keeps on taking'". The Guardian. Archived from the original on 8 October 2013.
- Burleson N, Breen K (9 November 2023). "Michael J. Fox talks funding breakthrough research for Parkinson's disease". CBS News.
- Davis P (3 May 2007). "Michael J. Fox". The Time 100. New York: Time. Archived from the original on 25 April 2011.
- "Education: Joy in Giving". Time. 18 January 1960. Archived from the original on 20 February 2011.
