= History of Parkinson's disease =

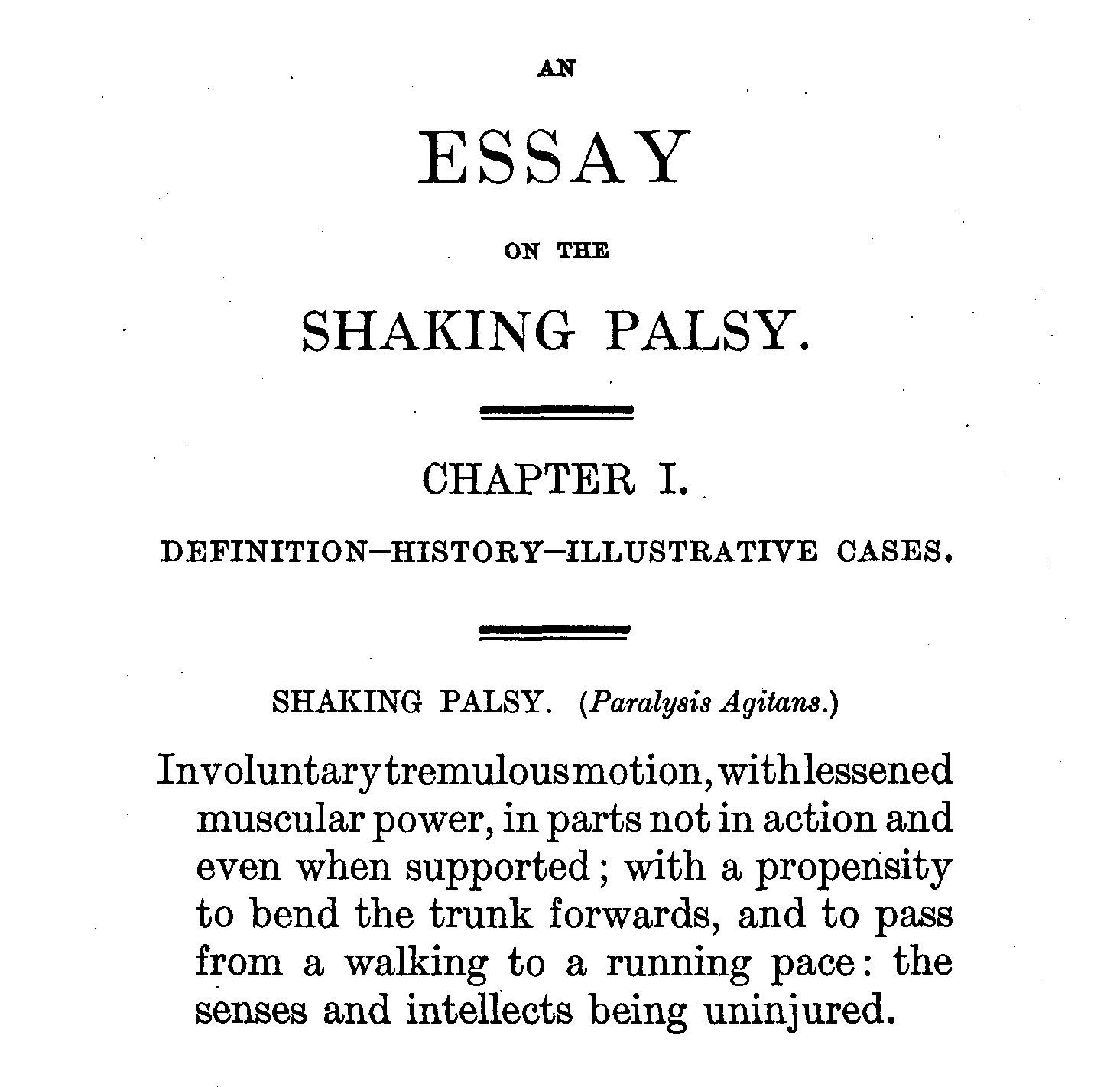
First page of James Parkinson's classical Essay on the Shaking Palsy

The history of Parkinson's disease expands from 1817, when British apothecary James Parkinson published An Essay on the Shaking Palsy, to modern times. Before Parkinson's descriptions, others had already described features of the disease that would bear his name, while the 20th century greatly improved knowledge of the disease and its treatments. PD was then known as paralysis agitans (shaking palsy in English). The term "Parkinson's disease" was coined in 1865 by William Sanders and later popularized by French neurologist Jean-Martin Charcot.

== Early descriptions ==
Several early sources describe symptoms resembling those of PD. An Egyptian papyrus from the 12th century B.C. mentions a king drooling with age and the Bible contains a number of references to tremor. An Ayurvedic medical treatise from the 10th century B.C. describes a disease that evolves with tremor, lack of movement, drooling and other symptoms of PD. Moreover, this disease was treated with remedies derived from the mucuna family, which is rich in L-DOPA. Galen wrote about a disease that almost certainly was PD, describing tremors that occur only at rest, postural changes and paralysis.

After Galen there are no known references unambiguously related to PD until the 17th century. In this and the following century several authors wrote about elements of the disease, preceding the description by Parkinson. Franciscus Sylvius, like Galen, distinguished tremor at rest from other tremors, while Johannes Baptiste Sagar and Hieronymus David Gaubius described festination, a term for the characteristic gait of PD. John Hunter provided a thorough description of the disease, which may have given Parkinson the idea of collecting and describing patients with "paralysis agitans". Finally, Auguste François Chomel in his pathology treatise, which was contemporary to Parkinson's essay, included several descriptions of abnormal movements and rigidity matching those seen in PD.

== 19th century ==
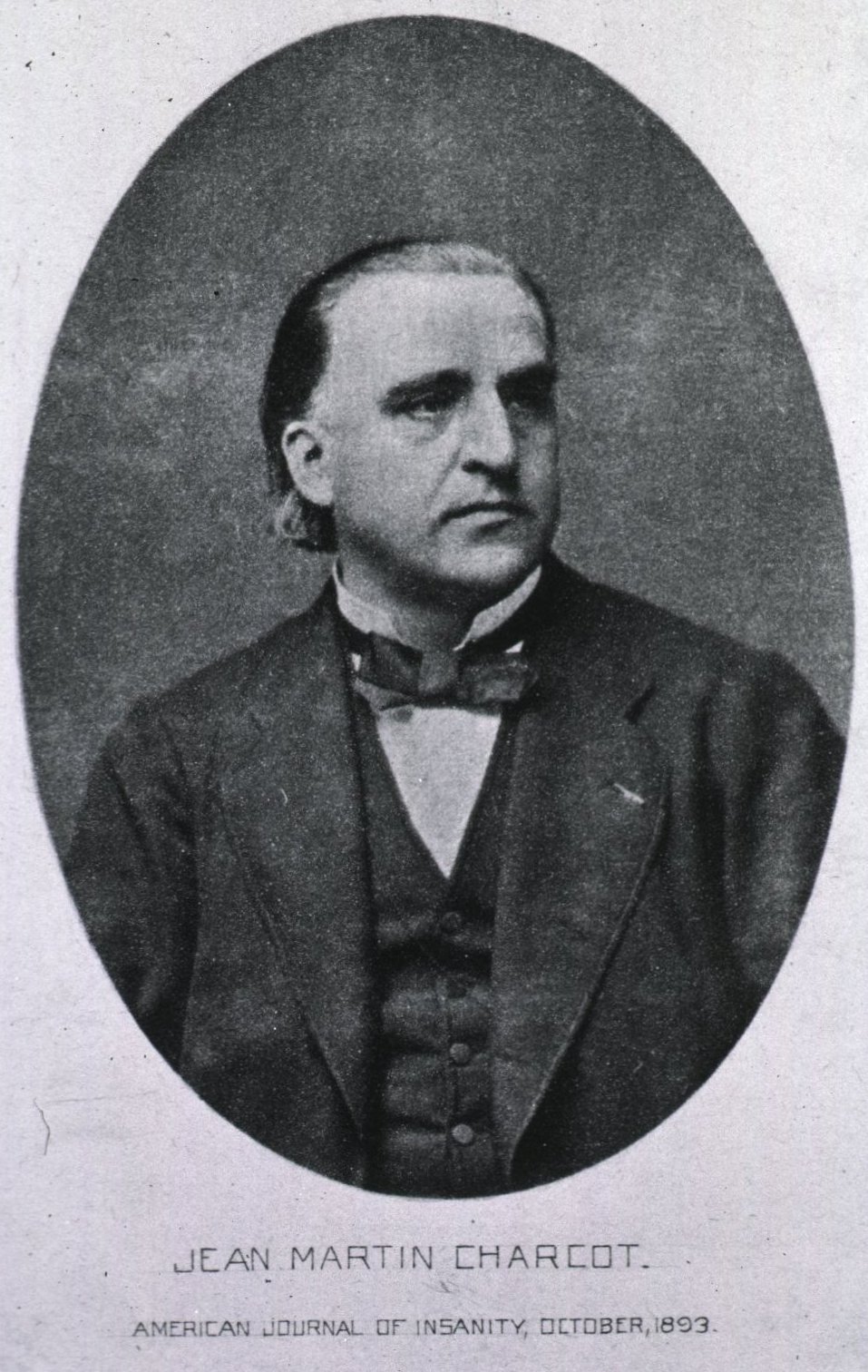
A 1893 photograph of Jean-Martin Charcot, who made contributions to the understanding of PD and proposed its name honoring James Parkinson

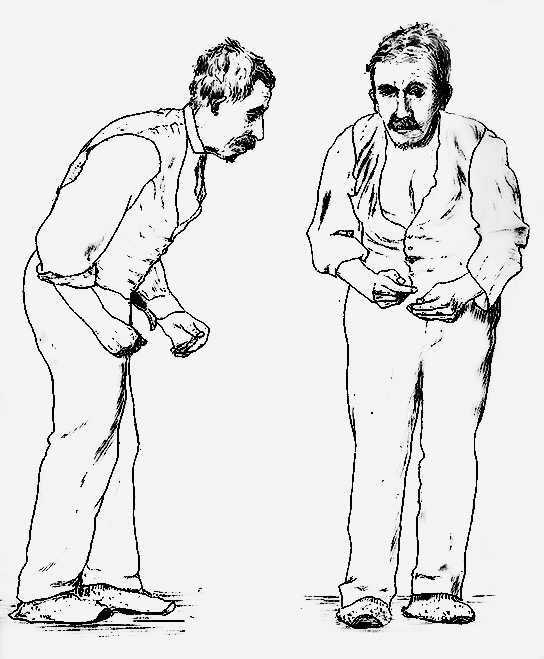
An individual with (advanced) Parkinson's disease, drawings by William Richard Gowers, published in 1886

In 1817, James Parkinson published his essay reporting six cases of what he called paralysis agitans. An Essay on the Shaking Palsy described the characteristic resting tremor, abnormal posture and gait, paralysis and diminished muscle strength, and the way that the disease progresses over time. He also acknowledged the contributions of many of the previously mentioned authors to the understanding of PD. Although the article was later considered the seminal work on the disease, it received little attention over the forty years that followed. Furthermore, the term paralysis agitans was at times applied to any condition with a loss of motor activity accompanied by seizures. Indeed, the term 'paralysis' alone included both motor and sensory deficits. Noting this, William Sanders proposed in 1865 that the term Parkinsons Disease be used for the onset of symptoms in older people; it had been variously designated paralysis agitans festinia, - senilis or parkinsonii.

Neurologists who made further additions to the knowledge of the disease include Trousseau, Gowers, Kinnier Wilson and Erb, and most notably Charcot, whose studies between 1868 and 1881 were a landmark in the understanding of the disease. Among other advances he made the distinction between rigidity, weakness and bradykinesia. He also championed the renaming of the disease in honor of Parkinson.

== 20th century and beyond ==
The first speculations concerning the anatomical substrate of PD were made 80 years after Parkinson's essay, when Édouard Brissaud proposed that it had its origin in the subthalamus or cerebral peduncle and might be caused by an ischemic lesion. In 1912 Frederic Lewy described a pathologic finding in affected brains, later named "Lewy bodies". In 1919 Konstantin Tretiakoff reported that the substantia nigra was the main cerebral structure affected, but this finding was not widely accepted until it was confirmed by further studies published by Rolf Hassler in 1938. The underlying biochemical changes in the brain were identified in the 1950s, due largely to the work of Arvid Carlsson on the neurotransmitter dopamine and Oleh Hornykiewicz on its role on PD. Carlsson was eventually awarded a Nobel Prize for this work.

Alice Lazzarini et al pinpointed a genetic component to PD in 1994. Years earlier, the neurology clinic at Robert Wood Johnson Medical School (RWJMS) had located a family of Italian origin that encompassed at least five generations of more than 400 individuals and at least 60 members with PD, and traced their ancestors to the small village of Contursi, Italy. In 1995, the RWJMS team joined with the National Center for Human Genome Research at the National Institutes of Health to take advantage of the laboratory resources available from the NIH in an effort to locate the gene causing PD in the Contursi family. The team reported the first Parkinson disease-causing mutation (PARK1) in the brain protein, alpha-synuclein. Within days of the publication of the PARK1 findings, alpha-synuclein was discovered to be the major component of Lewy bodies within brain cells of PD patients; according to the UMDNJ magazine, "This discovery changed the direction of research into PD by providing scientists with an entirely new protein whose manufacture, function or breakdown could be the key to the disease." Synuclein proteins being the main component of Lewy bodies was discovered in 1997 by Spillantini, Trojanowski, Goedert and others. Mutations in the parkin gene in autosomal recessive juvenile parkinsonism were discovered in 1998 and finally, between 2002 and 2005, DJ-1 gene mutations, PINK1 gene mutations and the most common mutations in the LRRK2 gene were identified in Japanese and European families. The pathological staging in Parkinson's disease was described by Heiko Braak in 2003.

== History of treatments ==
The positive albeit modest effects on tremor of anticholinergic alkaloids obtained from the plant of the belladonna were described during 19th century by Charcot, Erb and others. Modern surgery for tremor, consisting of the lesioning of some of the basal ganglia structures was first tried in 1939 and was improved over the following 20 years. Before this date surgery consisted in lesioning the corticospinal pathway with paralysis instead of tremor as result. Anticholinergics and surgery were the only treatments until the arrival of levodopa, which reduced their use dramatically. Levodopa was first synthesized in 1911 by Casimir Funk, but it received little attention until the mid 20th century. It entered clinical practice in 1967, and the first large study reporting improvements in people with Parkinson's disease resulting from treatment with levodopa was published in 1968. Levodopa brought about a revolution in the management of PD. By the late 1980s deep brain stimulation introduced by Alim-Louis Benabid and colleagues at Grenoble, France, emerged as a possible treatment and it was approved for clinical use by the FDA in 1997.
