= Lazzarini =

Lazzarini is an Italian surname. Notable people with the surname include:

- Adolfo Lazzarini (1952–2010), Paraguayan footballer
- Alice Lazzarini, American scientist, author, and researcher on neurogenetic disorders
- Arianna Lazzarini (born 1976), Italian politician
- Bert Lazzarini (1884–1952), Australian politician
- Carlo Lazzarini (1880–1952), Australian politician
- Domenico Lazzarini (1668–1734), Italian prelate, academic, classicist, playwright and poet
- Emanuel Lazzarini (born 1987), Argentine footballer
- Eugenio Lazzarini (born 1945), Italian motorcyclist
- Giovanni Andrea Lazzarini (1710–1801), Italian painter
- Giulia Lazzarini (born 1934), Italian actress
- Giulio Lazzarini (1927–2020), Italian politician
- Gregorio Lazzarini (1657–1730), Italian painter
- Isabella Lazzarini (born 1964), Italian historian
- Jacopo Lazzarini (born 1994), known professionally as Lazza, Italian rapper, singer and record producer
- Jorge-Emilio Lazzarini (born 1955), Argentine alpine skier
- Nick Lazzarini (born 1984), American dancer
- Philippe Lazzarini (born 1964), Swiss-Italian diplomat
- Pietro Lazzarini (1842–1918), Italian sculptor
- Robert Lazzarini (born 1965), American artist
- Roberto Lazzarini (born 1961), Brazilian fencer
- Victor Lazzarini (born 1969), Brazilian-Irish composer

== Other ==
- Estádio Bruno Lazzarini (Bruno Lazzarini Stadium), association football stadium in Leme, on the countryside of São Paulo, Brazil
