= Camaldoli, Campagna =

Camaldoli
- Frazione
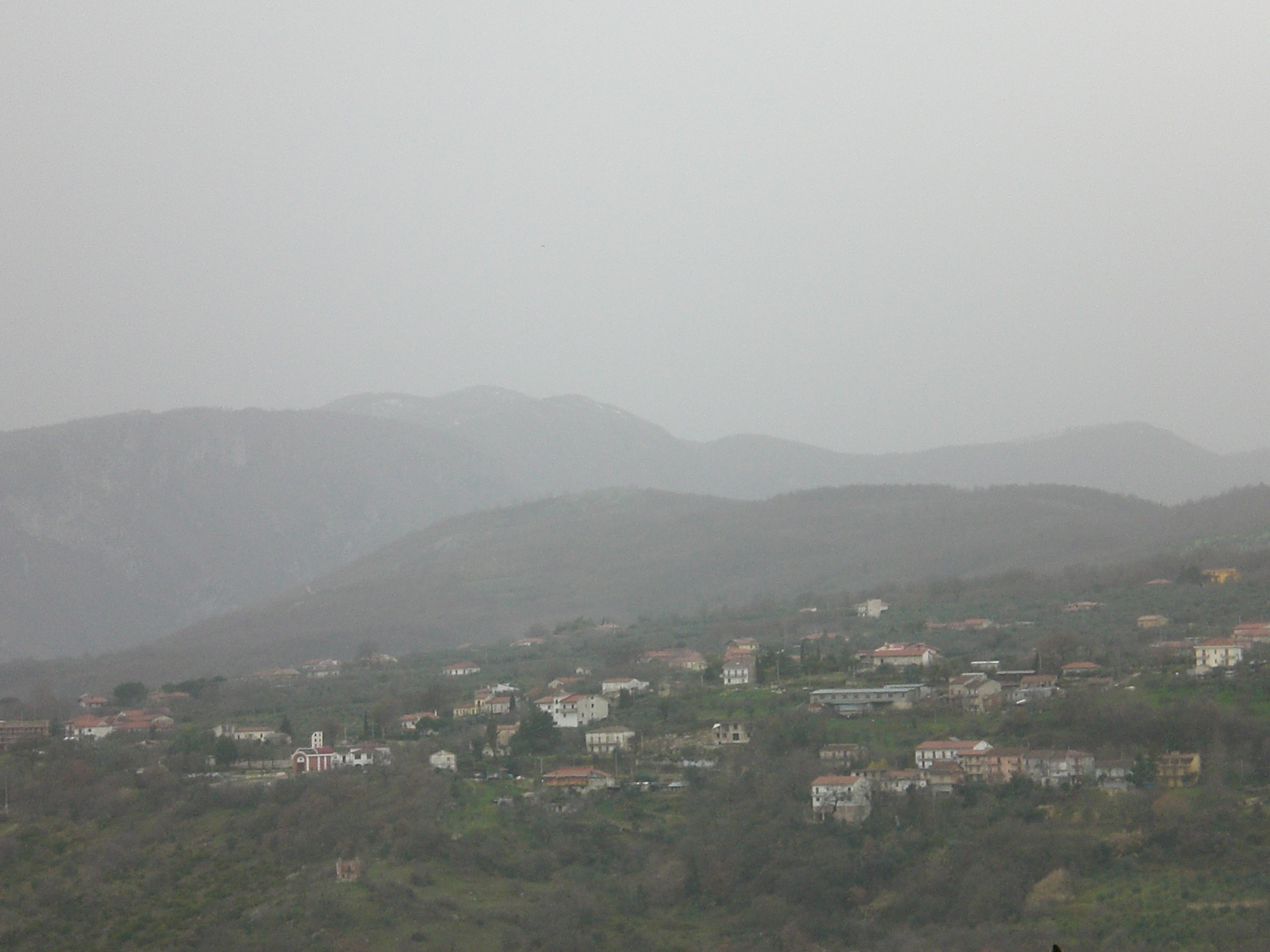

- Location of Camaldoli in Italy
- Coordinates: 40°39′9.01″N 15°10′30.44″E
- Country: Italy
- Region: Campania
- Province: Salerno (SA)
- Comune: Campagna
- Elevation: 355 m (1,165 ft)

Population (2001)
  - Total: 103
- Demonym: Camaldolesi
- Time zone: UTC+1 (CET)
  - Summer (DST): UTC+2 (CEST)
- Postal code: 84022
- Dialing code: 0828
- Website: Municipal website

Camaldoli is a hamlet (frazione) of the comune of Campagna in the Province of Salerno, Campania, Italy.

== Geography ==
The village is situated in a hill zone in the eastern side of the municipality, on a road linking Eboli to Contursi Terme.

== See also ==
- Campagna
- Puglietta
- Quadrivio
- Romandola-Madonna del Ponte
- Santa Maria La Nova
- Serradarce
