= Puglietta =

- Frazione
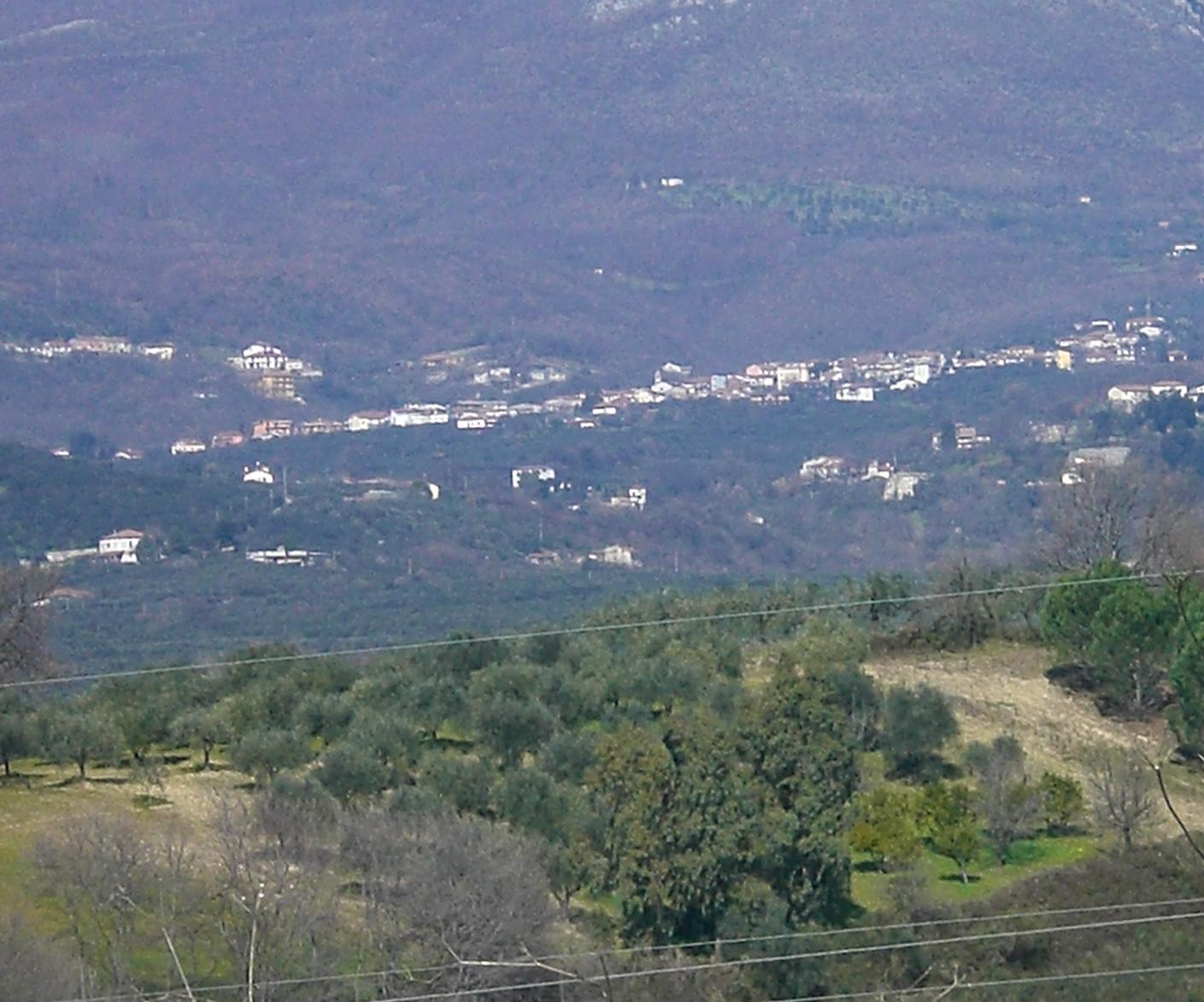

- Location of Puglietta in Italy
- Coordinates: 40°39′0.8″N 15°08′55.4″E
- Country: Italy
- Region: Campania
- Province: Salerno (SA)
- Comune: Campagna
- Elevation: 352 m (1,155 ft)

Population (2001)
  - Total: 870
- Demonym: Pugliettani
- Time zone: UTC+1 (CET)
  - Summer (DST): UTC+2 (CEST)
- Postal code: 84022
- Dialing code: 0828
- Website: Municipal website

Puglietta is a hamlet (frazione) of the comune of Campagna in the Province of Salerno, Campania, Italy.

== Geography ==
The village is situated in a hill zone in the central side of the municipality, between the hamlets of Quadrivio and Serradarce, on a road linking Eboli to Contursi Terme.

== See also ==
- Campagna
- Camaldoli
- Quadrivio
- Romandola-Madonna del Ponte
- Santa Maria La Nova
- Serradarce
