= Serradarce =

- Frazione
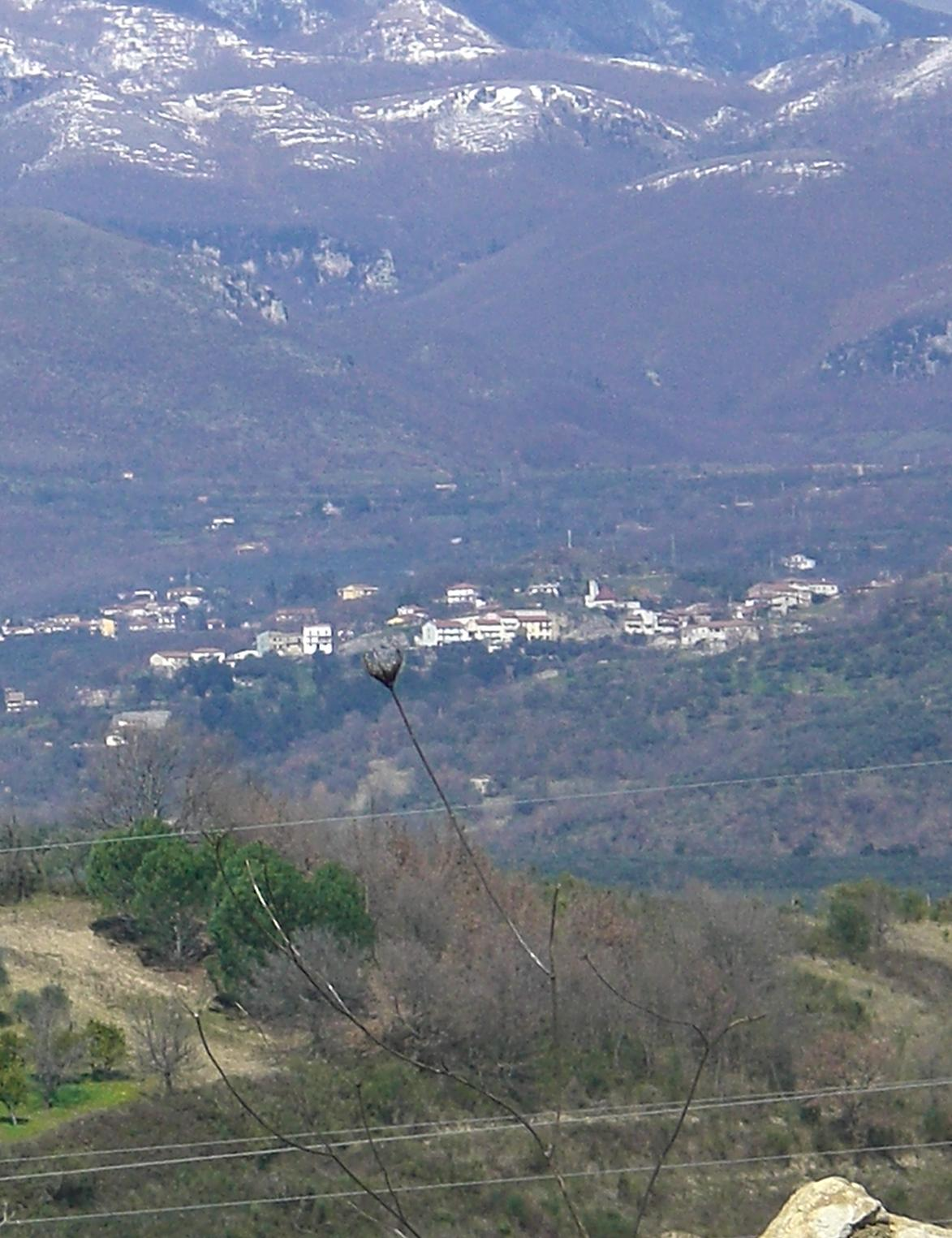

- Location of Serradarce in Italy
- Coordinates: 40°38′32″N 15°09′17″E
- Country: Italy
- Region: Campania
- Province: Salerno (SA)
- Comune: Campagna
- Elevation: 380 m (1,250 ft)

Population (2001)
  - Total: 447
- Demonym: Serradarcesi
- Time zone: UTC+1 (CET)
  - Summer (DST): UTC+2 (CEST)
- Postal code: 84022
- Dialing code: 0828
- Website: Municipal website

Serradarce is a hamlet (frazione) of the comune of Campagna in the Province of Salerno, Campania, Italy.

== Geography ==
The village is situated in a hill zone in the eastern side of the municipality, on a road linking Eboli to Contursi Terme.

== History ==
Even though numerous funerary finds of poor quality, presumably from the Bronze Age, have been found in the vicinity, Serradarce is of recent origin. Called Serra d'Arce in nineteenth-century documents, it owes its urban development to the construction of the "via del grano". The town grew following the construction of the church of Santa Maria del Buon Consiglio in 1852 and the annexed rectory where in 1870 an Italian and Latin language school was established. At the beginning of the twentieth century a civil registry office, a post office and an elementary school were opened. All these activities and the Tuori-Serradarce railway station (Salerno-Potenza railway) increased its development. Following the construction of the Salerno-Reggio Calabria, and the suppression of the railway station in 1960, it lost all its advantages and fell into decline.

== See also ==
- Campagna
- Camaldoli
- Puglietta
- Quadrivio
- Romandola-Madonna del Ponte
- Santa Maria La Nova
