= Campagna =

- Comune
- Comune di Campagna
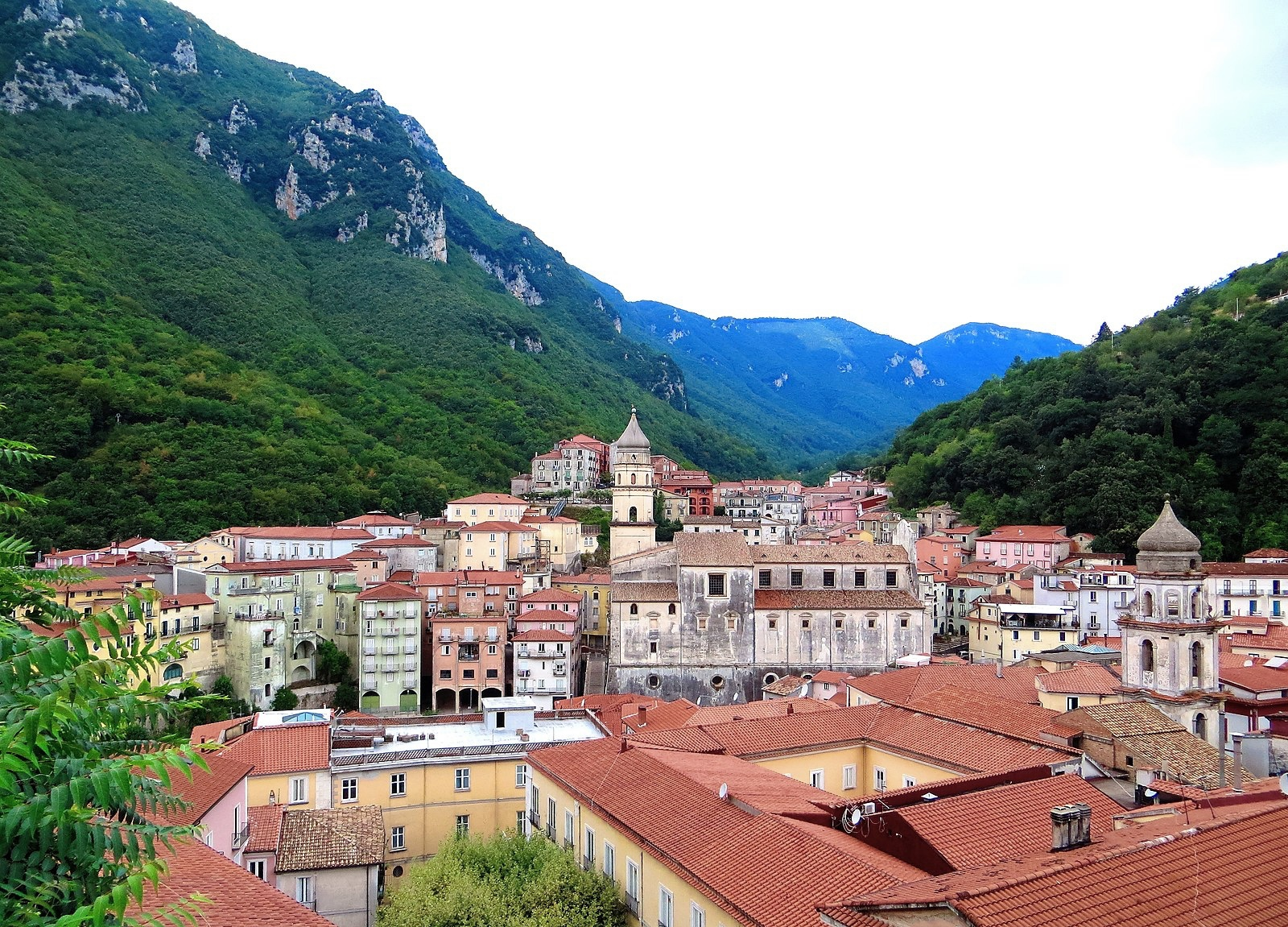
- General view of the town

- Coat of arms

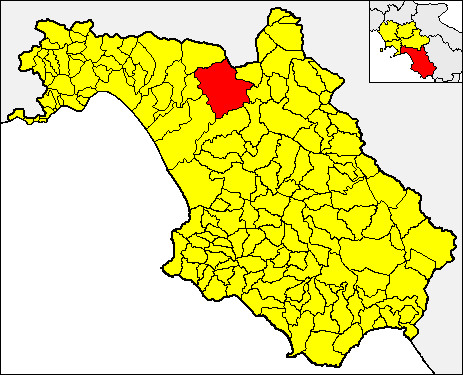
- Campagna within the Province of Salerno

- Location of Campagna in Italy Campagna (Campania)
- Coordinates: 40°40′N 15°6′E
- Country: Italy
- Region: Campania
- Province: Salerno (SA)
- Frazioni: Camaldoli, Galdo, Mattinelle, Puglietta, Quadrivio, Romandola-Madonna del Ponte, Santa Maria La Nova, Serradarce.

Government
  - Mayor: Roberto Monaco

Area
  - Total: 135.41 km^{2} (52.28 sq mi)
- Elevation: 270 m (890 ft)

Population (2009)
  - Total: 16,183
  - Density: 119.51/km^{2} (309.53/sq mi)
- Demonym: Campagnesi
- Time zone: UTC+1 (CET)
  - Summer (DST): UTC+2 (CEST)
- Postal code: 84022
- Dialing code: 0828
- ISTAT code: 065022
- Patron saint: Antoninus of Sorrento
- Saint day: 14 February

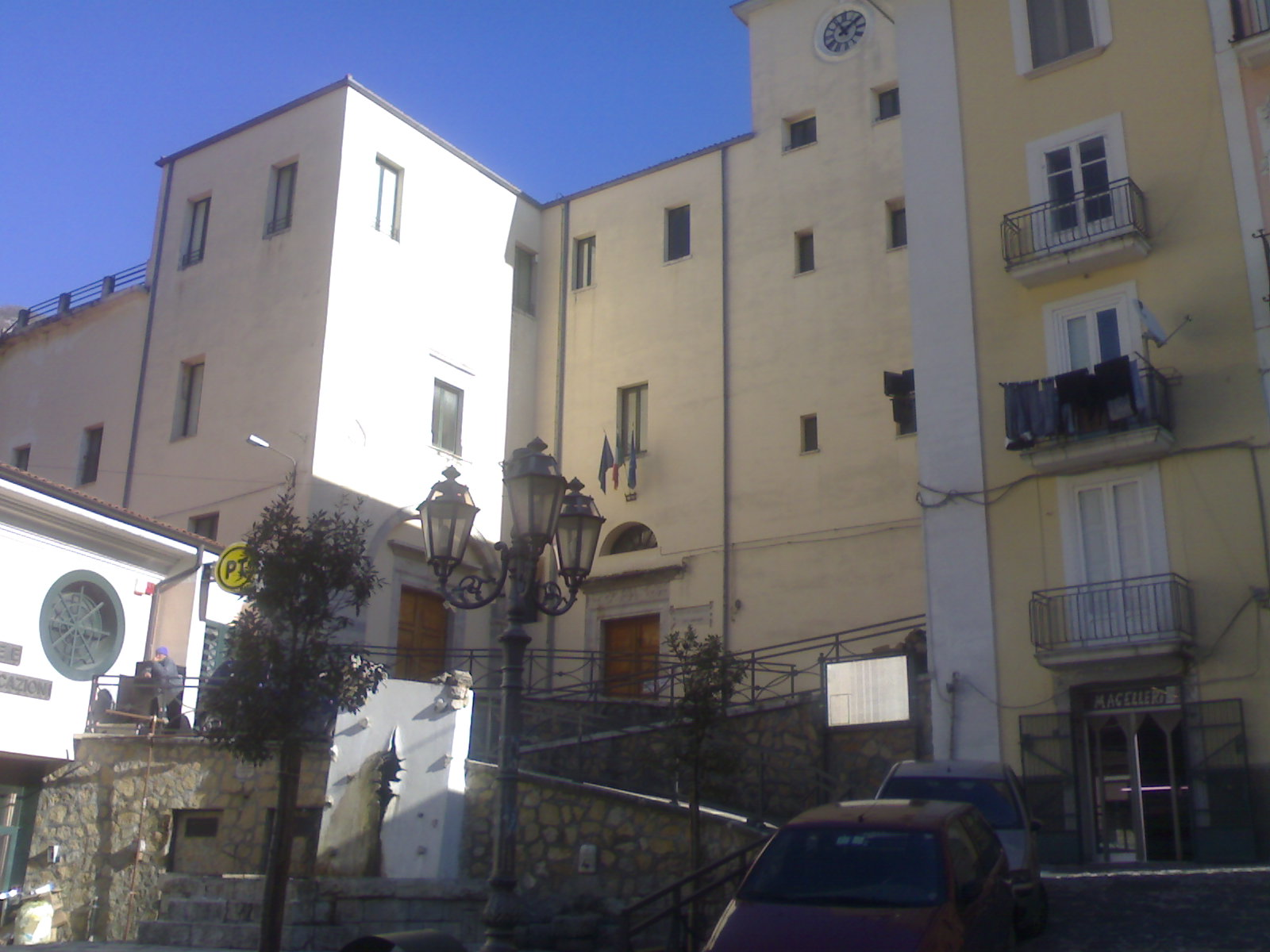
Palazzo Tercasio, the first print office of Principality of Salerno

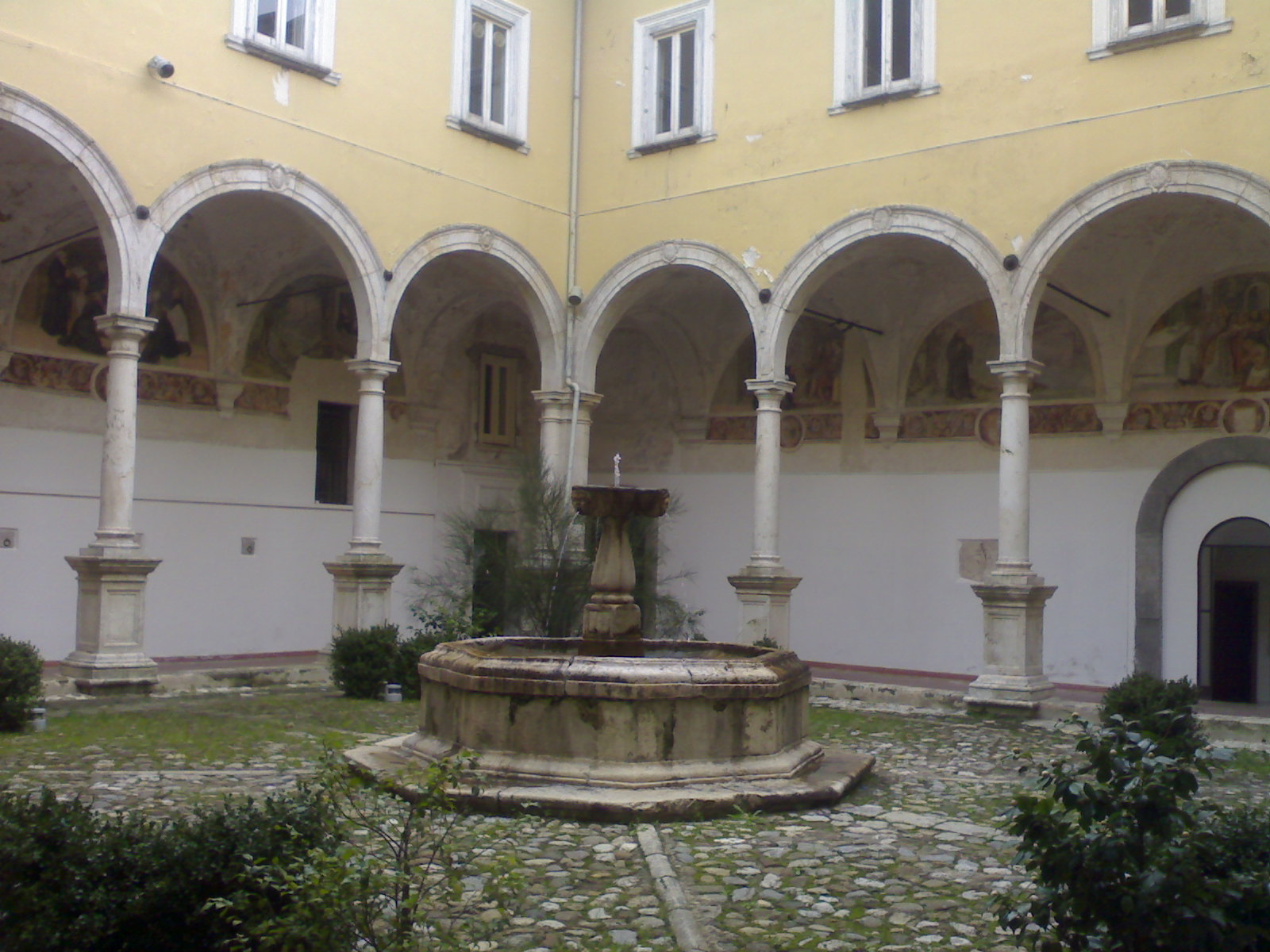
Palazzo di Città: the cloister

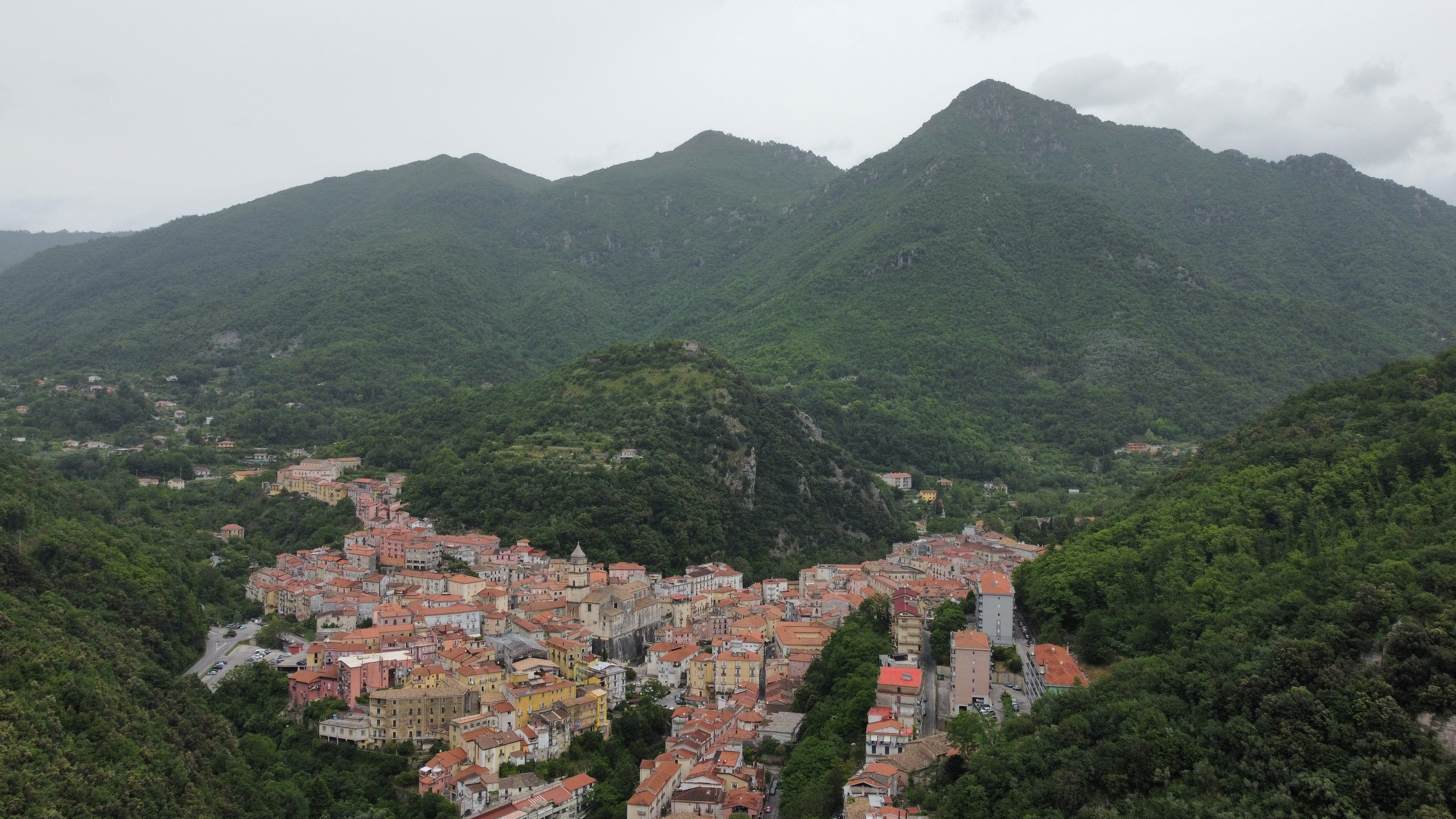
Aerial view of Campagna

Campagna (Italian: pronounced [kamˈpaɲɲa]) is a small town and comune of the province of Salerno, in the Campania region of Southern Italy. Its population is 17,148. Its old Latin name was Civitas Campaniae (City of Campagna). Campagna is located in one of the valleys of the Picentini Mountains, at an altitude of 270 meters above sea level.

== History ==
The first records of the area date back to the ninth century in the Lombard period. The position of the town was strategic to defend against enemy attacks during the Middle Ages. Later, the town became an important cultural and religious center. It was the seat of bishops until 1973, when the Diocese of Campagna merged with the Archdiocese of Salerno.

During the Second World War, Campagna was a temporary home for many Jews thanks to Giovanni Palatucci and his uncle Giuseppe Maria Palatucci. People arrived from the north of Italy and Campagna citizens hid those people in the basements of the churches. Giovanni Palatucci was later honoured as a Righteous Among the Nations by the Yad Vashem Holocaust Memorial. Much of this is documented in Elizabeth Bettina's book, It Happened in Italy. Today, goods left by the Jews are shown in the Museo della Memoria in the town centre.

== Geography ==
Campagna borders Acerno, Contursi Terme, Eboli, Olevano sul Tusciano, Oliveto Citra, Postiglione, and Serre, all in the Province of Salerno, and Senerchia in the Province of Avellino.

The municipality counts the frazioni of Camaldoli, Galdo, Mattinelle, Puglietta, Quadrivio, Romandola-Madonna del Ponte, Santa Maria La Nova and Serradarce. Other localities are Avigliano, Folcata, Oppidi-Varano, Saginara and Sant'Angelo.

== Tourist destinations ==
=== Castles, palaces, fountains and bridges ===
- Castle Gerione (10th century)
- Castle De Alegisio (10th century)
- Palazzo di Città (13th century)
- Palace Ducale Pironti (1694)
- Palazzo Tercasio (14th century)
- Palazzo dei Governatori dei Principi di Monaco (15th century)
- Palazzo Rivelli (14th century-17th century)
- Palazzo Pastore-Alinante (16th century)
- Palazzo Bernalla (14th century)
- Palazzo Trotta (16th century)
- Fountain Giudeca (15th century)
- Fountain S.Lucia (15th century)
- Fountain Cortiglia (15th century)
- Bridge of Presbyteres (15th century)
- Bridge of piazza Guerriero (15th century)

=== Churches, religious buildings and structures ===
- Basilica co-cathedral of Santa Maria della Pace (1112-1683)
- Church and convent Dominican of San Bartolomeo (14th century)
- Shrine of Madonna di Avigliano (1377)
- Church of SS. Annunziata (13th century)
- Church of SS Salvatore e Sant'Antonino (11th century)
- Church of S.Giovanni (16th century)
- Seminary di S. Spirito (15th century)
- Monastery of Maddalena (14th century)
- Church and convent of Osservanti della Concezione (15th century)
- Abbey of Santa Maria La Nova (1220–1249)
- Monastery of San Martino (16th century)
- Hermitage of S.Erasmo e S.Giacomo degli eremiti (11th century)
- Hermitage of San Michele di Montenero (12th century)
- Hermitage of S. Maria Domenica (16th century)

=== Museums ===
- Itinerario della Memoria e della Pace
- Museo della confraternita dei cinturati di Santa Maria del Soccorso

=== Nature reserve ===
- Oasi naturale del Monte Polveracchio
- Oasi di Persano
- Riserva naturale Foce Sele-Tanagro

== Notable people ==
- Antoninus of Sorrento, catholic saint born at Campagna
- Honoré I, Lord of Monaco, Marquis of Campagna
- Charles II, Lord of Monaco, Marquis of Campagna
- Hercule, Lord of Monaco, Marquis of Campagna
- Honoré II, Prince of Monaco, Marquis of Campagna
- Juan Caramuel y Lobkowitz, bishop of Campagna
- Louis I, Prince of Monaco, Marquis of Campagna
- Giordano Bruno, philosopher Dominican friar
- Giulio Cesare Capaccio, historian of Campagna
- Melchiorre Guerriero, noble of Campagna

== A' Chiena ==
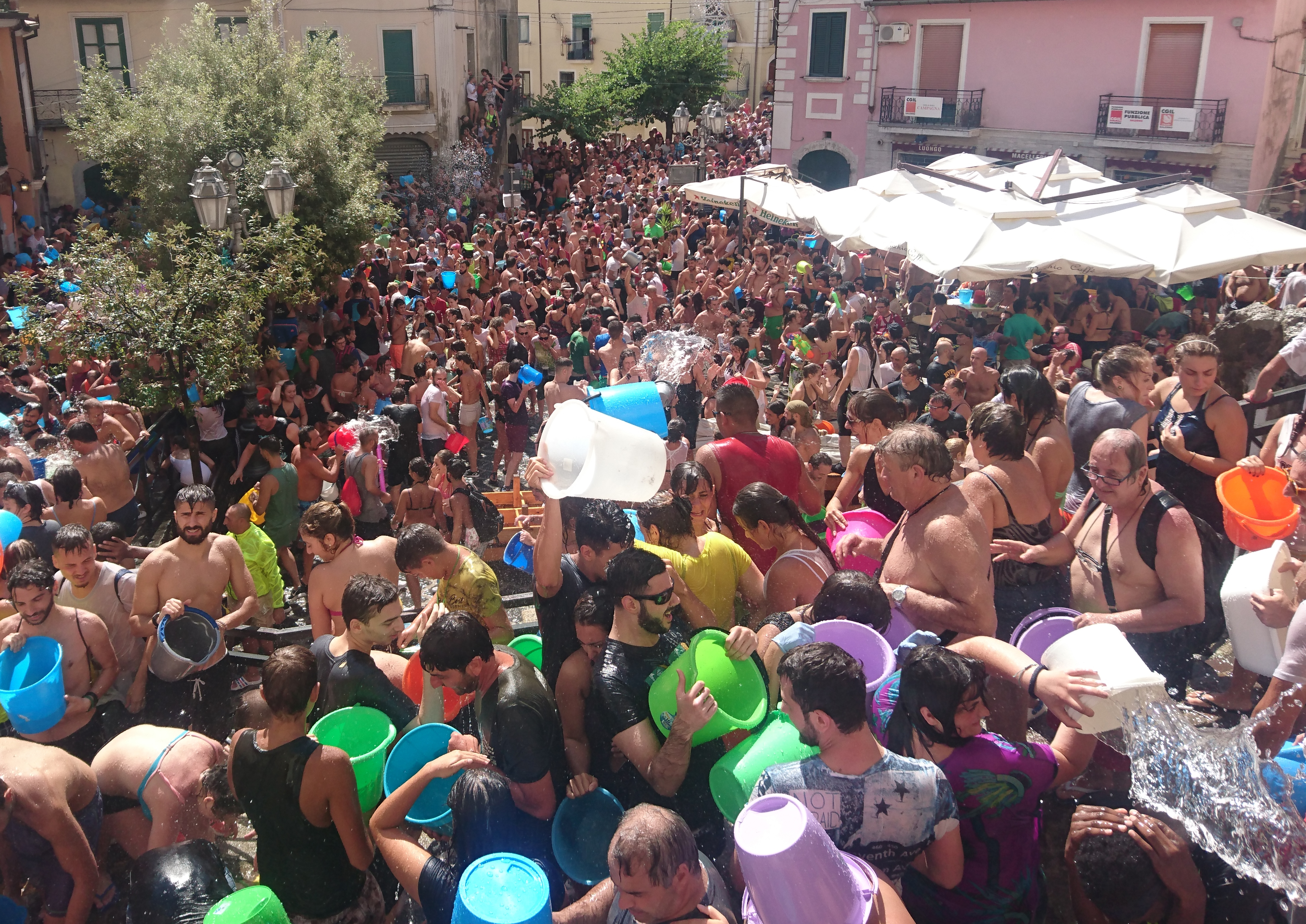
'A Chiena in August 2017.

Campagna is famous for its traditional summer event ‘A Chiena’ (Italian: La Piena), which takes place annually every weekend between July and August. During the event, the city river Tenza is deflected from its natural course through the city main street where people wait for the water to come. This tradition comes from the ancient practice of cleaning the streets by using the river water. Later, it was converted into a delightful moment for locals and tourists.

== I Fucanoli ==
I Fucanoli is festival in honour of Sant'Antonio, taking place on 17 January. The celebrations begin in the late afternoon with a service followed by a procession whereby the Sant'Antonio statue is carried in the streets of the city centre. While the statue is carried through the streets, huge fires are ignited.

== House of Grimaldi ==
From 1532 to 1641, Campagna was ruled by the Grimaldi family, princes of Monaco, after Emperor Charles V granted them the Marquisate of Campagna as their Italian capital; during this “Golden Century,” the city flourished with noble palaces, monasteries, fountains, bridges, an active diocese, a humanistic and scientific university, one of Italy’s earliest printing presses, and hydromechanical industries, while the dominion also included Canosa di Puglia, Terlizzi, Monteverde, Ripacandida, Ginestra, and Garagnone. Although Grimaldi rule ended in 1641, its legacy remains visible in Campagna’s architecture and urban fabric; ties with Monaco were renewed in 1991 by Prince Rainier III and later strengthened by visits of Prince Albert II in 1997 and 2018 within the Historic Sites of the Grimaldis of Monaco program.

== Sister city ==
Monte Carlo in the Principality of Monaco is Campagna's sister city.
