= Gonzalo Rodríguez Lafora =

Spanish neurologist (1886–1971)

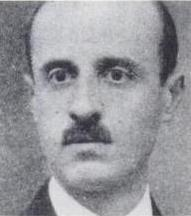
- Gonzalo Rodríguez Lafora
- Born: 25 July 1886; Madrid
- Died: 27 December 1971 (aged 85); Madrid
- Known for: Lafora disease
- Scientific career
- Fields: neurology

Gonzalo Rodríguez Lafora (25 July 1886 – 27 December 1971) was a Spanish neurologist and psychiatrist. He was a disciple of Nicolás Achúcarro and Santiago Ramón y Cajal and one of the most brilliant examples of the Spanish Neurological School (or Cajal School). He was best known now for describing (in 1911) the intracytoplasmic inclusion bodies in "Lafora disease". In total, he published approximately 200 papers covering a wide range of subjects in neurology, psychiatry, and neuropathology. He made seminal contributions not only to the clinical and scientific literature but also to the training of many noted disciples who paid him due homage as a true "maestro." Throughout his intellectual endeavors, Lafora manifested a singular purpose and intensity and a burning devotion to scientific honesty.

In 1910, Fritz Heinrich Lewy discovered what became known as Lewy bodies, and compared them to earlier findings by Lafora. In 1913, Lafora described another case, and acknowledged Lewy as the discoverer, naming them cuerpos intracelulares de Lewy (Lewy bodies). Konstantin Nikolaevich Trétiakoff found them in 1919 in the substantia nigra of PD brains, called them corps de Lewy and is credited with the eponym. Eliasz Engelhardt argued in 2017 that Lafora should be credited with the eponym, because he named them six years before Trétiakoff.

== See also ==
- Lafora disease
- Justo Gonzalo
