= Rolf Hassler =

German pathologist

Rolf Hassler (1914–1984) was a German pathologist who made important discoveries on the pathophysiology and treatment of Parkinson's disease (PD).

In 1938 he published the autopsies of PD patients that showed while the striatum and globus pallidus were mostly unaffected and the main affected structure was the substantia nigra pars compacta; it lost many neurons and also held abundant Lewy bodies. Such findings confirmed Konstantin Tretiakoff's theories, who in 1919 had reported that the substantia nigra was the main cerebral structure affected.

Hassler later was the director of the Max-Planck-Institut für Hirnforschung at Frankfurt am Main where he continued his studies on PD, becoming a pioneer in surgery for tremors.
