= Quadrivio =

- Frazione
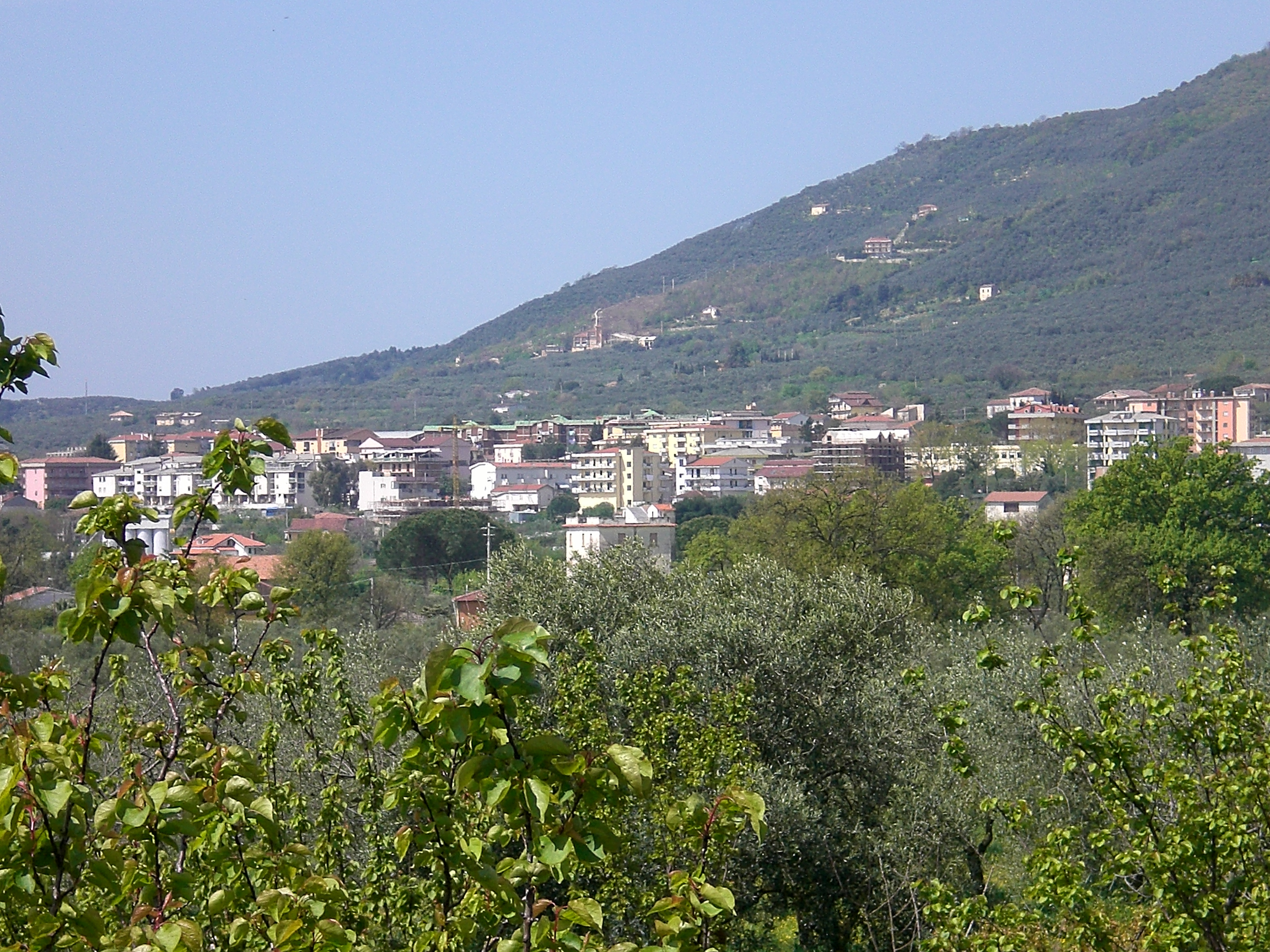

- Location of Quadrivio in Italy
- Coordinates: 40°38′13.56″N 15°06′21.6″E
- Country: Italy
- Region: Campania
- Province: Salerno (SA)
- Comune: Campagna
- Elevation: 275 m (902 ft)

Population (2001)
  - Total: 5,352
- Demonym: Quadriviesi
- Time zone: UTC+1 (CET)
  - Summer (DST): UTC+2 (CEST)
- Postal code: 84022
- Dialing code: 0828
- Website: Municipal website

Quadrivio is a hamlet (frazione) of the comune of Campagna in the Province of Salerno, Campania, Italy. With a population of 5,352 it is the most populated settlement in its municipality.

== History ==
The locality, originally named Starza, due to its position in the middle of a road junction (SS91 with SP31 and SP38) assumed the actual name meaning, in Italian, road junction. Built in the 1950s, it grew rapidly after 1980 Irpinia earthquake, becoming a single urban area with the union of the surrounding localities of Piantito, Vetrale, Fravitole, Visciglito and Starza proper.

== Geography ==
The village is situated in the middle of its municipality and not too far from the town of Eboli.

== Economy ==
Due to its geographical position and to its population, Quadrivio is the economic core of the municipality. It has factories, shops, banks, two pharmacies and one hotel.

== See also ==
- Campagna
- Camaldoli
- Puglietta
- Romandola-Madonna del Ponte
- Santa Maria La Nova
- Serradarce
