= Santa Maria La Nova, Campagna =

Santa Maria La Nova
- Frazione
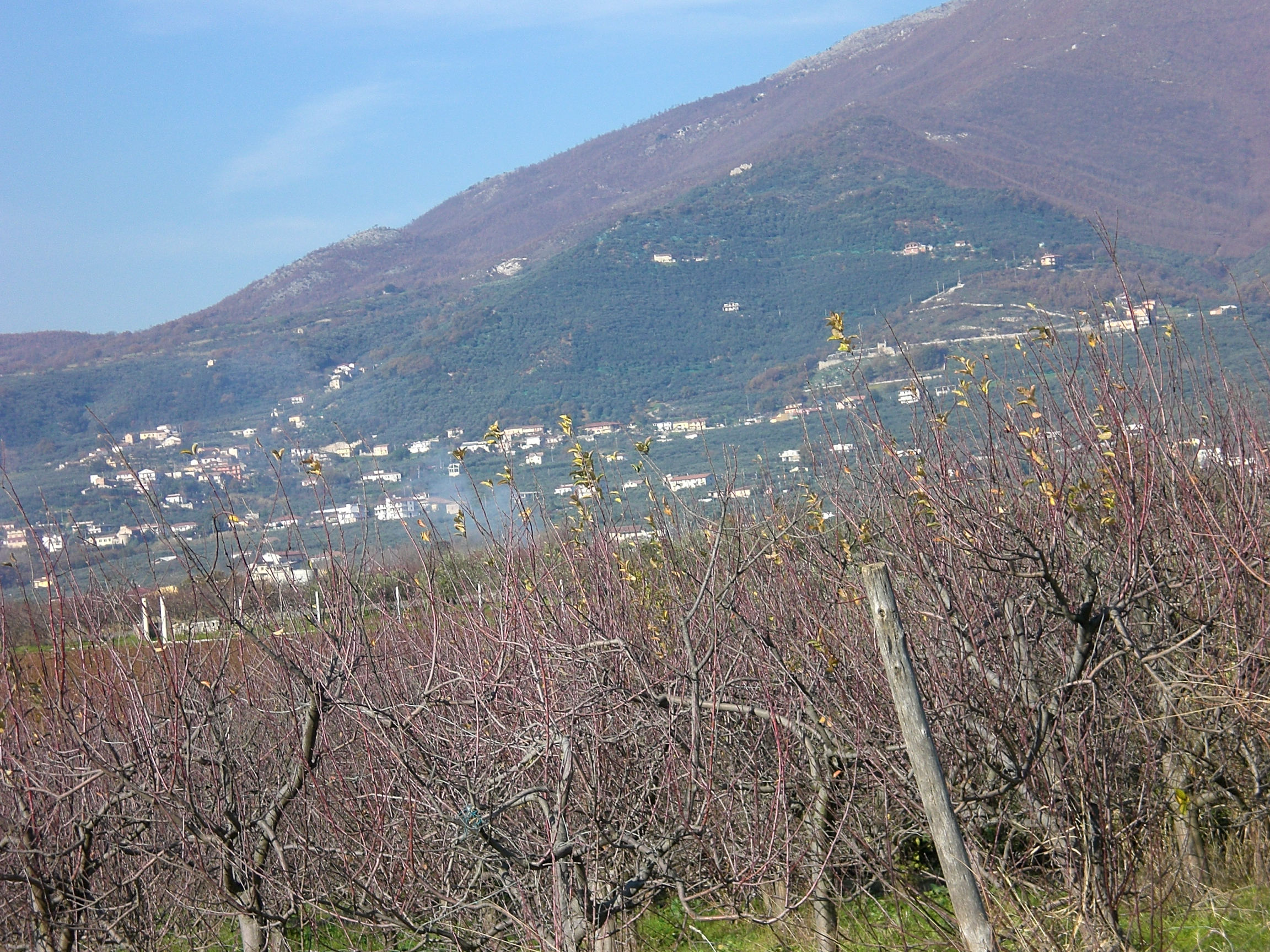

- Location of Santa Maria La Nova in Italy
- Coordinates: 40°37′50″N 15°04′44″E
- Country: Italy
- Region: Campania
- Province: Salerno (SA)
- Comune: Campagna
- Elevation: 275 m (902 ft)

Population (2001)
  - Total: 440
- Demonym: none (Campagnesi)
- Time zone: UTC+1 (CET)
  - Summer (DST): UTC+2 (CEST)
- Postal code: 84022
- Dialing code: 0828
- Website: Municipal website

Santa Maria La Nova is a hamlet (frazione) of the comune of Campagna in the Province of Salerno, Campania, Italy.

== Geography ==
Santa Maria La Nova is situated near the Ripalta Mountain and very close to the town of Eboli, separated from its municipality by the little river Ausella.

== Population ==
According to the 2001 census, the population of Santa Maria La Nova is approximately 440 inhabitants.

== See also ==
- Campagna
- Camaldoli
- Puglietta
- Quadrivio
- Romandola-Madonna del Ponte
- Serradarce
