= Michel Goedert =

Luxembourgish-British neuroscientist

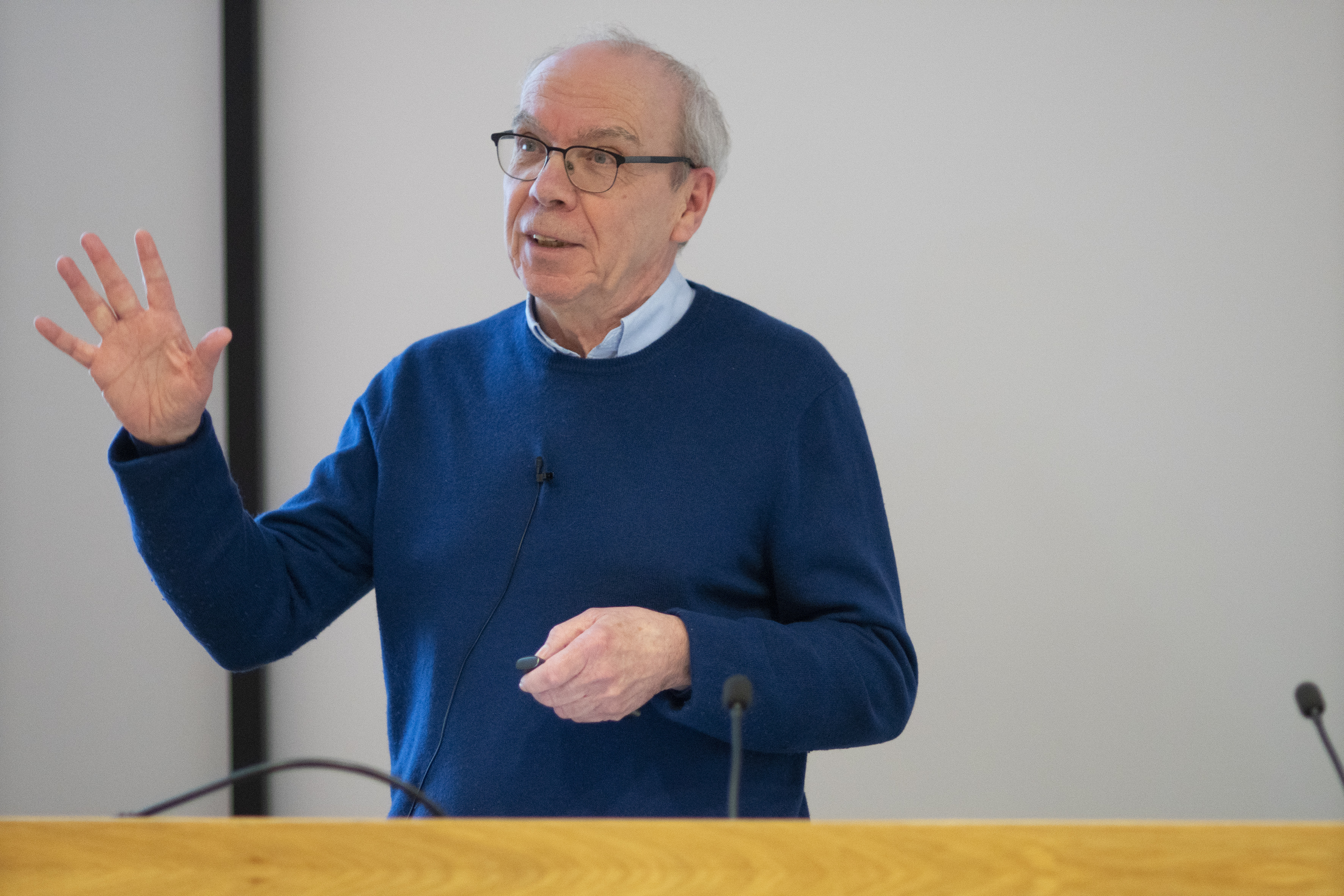
Michel Goedert

Michel Goedert is a neuroscientist whose research studies the molecular mechanisms underlying human neurodegenerative diseases, such as Alzheimer's, Parkinson's, and related disorders. He is a Programme Leader at the Medical Research Council (MRC) Laboratory of Molecular Biology in Cambridge, U.K., and an Emeritus Honorary Professor in the Department of Clinical Neurosciences at the University of Cambridge. His research established important roles for the proteins tau and alpha-synuclein in neurodegenerative diseases.

== Early life and education ==
Goedert was born in Luxembourg on May 22, 1954, where he was educated and lived until 1973. He then studied medicine at the University of Basel, receiving an MD degree in 1980. He subsequently moved to the University of Cambridge, where he obtained a PhD in 1984.

== Career ==
After completing his doctoral studies, Goedert joined the MRC Laboratory of Molecular Biology (LMB) in Cambridge as a postdoctoral scientist. He became a Programme Leader-track at the LMB in 1987 and Programme Leader in 1990. He subsequently joined the Laboratory's Neurobiology Division and served as its Head, jointly or alone, from 2003 to 2016. He was appointed an Honorary Professor at the University of Cambridge in 2014. Goedert has spent most of his research career at the MRC Laboratory of Molecular Biology, where he has led research into the molecular basis of neurodegenerative diseases. His work combines molecular biology, biochemistry and structural biology to investigate the protein aggregates found in the brains of people with neurodegenerative disorders.

== Research ==
=== Tau and Alzheimer's disease ===
A major part of Goedert's research is concerned with tau, a microtubule-associated protein found predominantly in neurons. Tau is involved in the organisation and stabilisation of microtubules, but abnormal forms of the protein can assemble into filamentous structures associated with neurodegeneration.

In 1986, Goedert began to collaborate with Claude Wischik, Tony Crowther, John Walker and Aaron Klug on determining the molecular nature of the paired helical filaments (PHFs) found in Alzheimer's disease. In 1988, they demonstrated that tau is a central component of these filaments. Goedert and colleagues subsequently characterised the molecular forms of tau that are expressed in the human nervous system. They showed that the adult human brain contains six tau isoforms generated from a single gene through alternative mRNA splicing. These isoforms were found in the PHFs of Alzheimer's disease. This work helped establish tau pathology as a molecular feature shared by a number of neurodegenerative diseases. Tau-containing filamentous inclusions occur in Alzheimer's disease and in several other disorders collectively described as tauopathies, including progressive supranuclear palsy, corticobasal degeneration, Pick's disease and some forms of frontotemporal dementia.

Goedert also investigated the biochemical mechanisms underlying tau filament formation. His research examined the abnormal phosphorylation and assembly of tau and the effects of a number of molecules, including sulphated glycosaminoglycans, on tau aggregation.

=== MAPT mutations and inherited dementias ===
In 1998, together with Maria Grazia Spillantini and Bernardino Ghetti, Goedert identified a mutation in MAPT, the gene encoding tau, in an inherited form of frontotemporal dementia with abundant filamentous tau inclusions. These findings provided genetic evidence that abnormalities in tau itself can cause neurodegeneration and dementia rather than merely occurring as a consequence of disease.

Subsequent work identified mutations and other genetic changes affecting MAPT and their relationships to different tauopathies. Goedert has also studied how altered tau isoform expression, abnormal phosphorylation and filament assembly contribute to neurodegenerative processes.

=== Prion-like spreading of assembled tau ===
In 2009, together with Florence Clavaguera and Markus Tolnay, Goedert used transgenic mouse lines and intracerebral injection of tau filaments to demonstrate that assembled tau can seed aggregation in a given brain region, followed by the spreading of filamentous tau inclusions from the injection sites to anatomically connected brain regions. A few years later, they showed that the intracerebral injection of transgenic mice with brain homogenates from humans with Alzheimer's disease, tangle-only dementia, argyrophilic grain disease, progressive supranuclear palsy and corticobasal degeneration induces the formation of tau inclusions with the same light microscopic characteristics as in the human diseases. In more recent work, Scheres, Goedert and colleagues reported that the injection of tau filaments from the brains of individuals with Alzheimer's disease or corticobasal degeneration into the brains of wild-type mice resulted in the formation of cell type-specific tau inclusions characteristic of each disease and the formation of filaments of mouse tau with the same structures as those of the human seeds.

=== Alpha-synuclein and Parkinson's disease ===
Goedert's research also determined the molecular composition of the pathological inclusions associated with Parkinson's disease. In 1997, working with Maria Grazia Spillantini, Ross Jakes and other collaborators, he identified alpha-synuclein as the major component of Lewy bodies and Lewy neurites, the characteristic filamentous inclusions associated with Parkinson's disease and dementia with Lewy bodies. The discovery linked alpha-synuclein directly to the neuropathology of Parkinson's disease and established it as a central protein in a group of disorders now known as synucleinopathies. Goedert and colleagues subsequently identified multiple system atrophy as the third major synucleinopathy, extending the significance of alpha-synuclein pathology beyond Lewy body diseases. Research on alpha-synuclein has included its aggregation into amyloid filaments, the relationship between genetic alterations in SNCA, the gene encoding alpha-synuclein, and disease, as well as the structural properties of alpha-synuclein assemblies found in human brain tissues.

=== Structural biology and electron cryo-microscopy ===
Since 2017, Goedert has been collaborating with Sjors Scheres from the LMB's Structural Studies Division. They are using electron cryo-microscopy (cryo-EM) to model the atomic structures of amyloid filaments extracted from human brains.

Their research showed that tau filaments associated with different neurodegenerative diseases can adopt distinct molecular structures. In 2021, they reported a structure-based classification of tauopathies based on the conformations of pathological tau filaments. In 2020, Goedert, Scheres and collaborators also reported the atomic structures of alpha-synuclein filaments extracted from the brains of individuals with multiple system atrophy. Two years later, they determined the structure of the Lewy fold from the brains of humans with Parkinson's disease, Parkinson's disease dementia and dementia with Lewy bodies. This work provided structural information about disease-associated alpha-synuclein assemblies and contributed to the classification of synucleinopathies based on filament structures.

Goedert's group also investigated amyloid-beta and TMEM106B filaments using cryo-EM. This research programme relates the structures of pathological protein assemblies to the different diseases in which they occur.

=== Mechanisms of tau filament formation ===
More recent research has examined how tau molecules assemble into the filaments found in human neurodegenerative diseases. Goedert and collaborators have sought experimental systems capable of producing filaments that reproduce the structures observed in human brain tissue.

The LMB reports that their work has demonstrated that recombinant tau fragments can form filaments identical to PHFs isolated from Alzheimer's disease and other conditions. Similar work has been conducted with full-length tau carrying amino-acid substitutions designed to promote filament formation.

=== Beginnings ===
In 2024, Michel Goedert published Beginnings: Looking back on twenty years in the Conseil de Gouvernance de l'Université du Luxembourg (Point Nemo Publishing), an illustrated semi-autobiographical account of the development of the University of Luxembourg and his involvement in its governance. Goedert served on the university's governing board from 2004 to 2023, and the book draws on his experience of the institution during its first two decades.

== Personal life ==
Goedert's partner is Professor Maria Grazia Spillantini, a neuroscientist, with whom he has a son, Thomas.

== Awards and Honours ==
- Metropolitan Life Foundation Award for Medical Research, 1996, shared with Yasuo Ihara, Virginia Lee, Brenda Milner and John Trojanowski
- Potamkin Prize for Pick's, Alzheimer's and Related Disorders, 1998, shared with Virginia Lee and John Trojanowski
- Member of the European Molecular Biology Organization, elected 1998
- Fellow of the Royal Society, elected 2000
- Prix Lions Luxembourg, 2002
- Fellow of the Academy of Medical Sciences, elected 2006
- European Grand Prix from the Fondation pour la Recherche sur Alzheimer, 2014
- The Brain Prize, 2018, shared with Bart De Strooper, Christian Haass and John Hardy
- Royal Medal of the Royal Society, 2019
- Rainwater Prize for Outstanding Innovation in Neurodegenerative Research, 2020
- Piepenbrock-DZNE Prize, 2021
- Annemarie Opprecht Foundation Parkinson Award, 2023, shared with Sjors Scheres
- Karl Golser Foundation Award, 2024
- Honorary Member, Institut Grand-Ducal, Section des Sciences, Luxembourg, 2025
- Helis Foundation Award for Parkinson's Disease and Neurodegenerative Research, 2026
