= Monte Ripalta =

Mountain in Italy

- Location within Italy

Highest point
- Elevation: 1,014 m (3,327 ft)
- Coordinates: 40°24′04″N 15°02′37″E

Geography
- Location: Campania, Italy
- Parent range: Apennine Mountains

Monte Ripalta is a mountain in Campania, Italy. It is 1,013 meters high. It is a popular destination for hiking. It is near the comune of Eboli.
