= Filippo Gibbone =

Former Bishop of Eboli, Italy

- Born: Eboli, Italy
- Died: Eboli, Italy
- Other names: Padre Gibbone
- Occupation: bishop

Filippo Gibbone served as a bishop (fl. 1880–1903) in Eboli, Italy, and wrote a book on Saint Antonino Abate. It was published in 1885, and official name was, "Vita del santo abate Antonino di Campagna."

In addition to being a hagiographer Gibbone was also Cantor, and earned his doctorate in theology.

== See also ==
- Chaplain of His Holiness
