= Sjors Scheres =

Dutch scientist

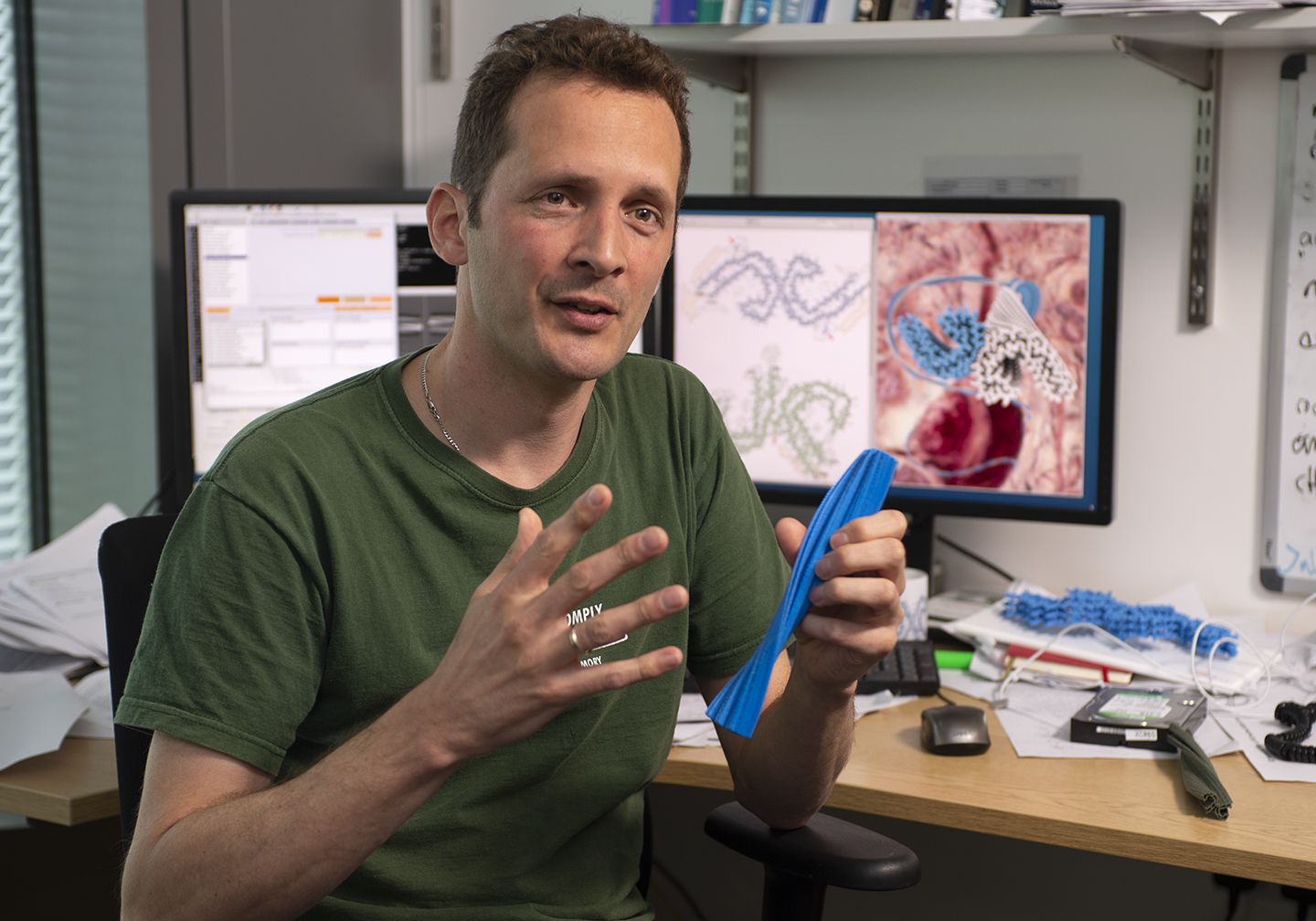
- Education: Utrecht University
- Scientific career
- Workplaces: MRC Laboratory of Molecular Biology; Spanish National Center for Biotechnology (CNB); Utrecht University
- Thesis: Conditional Optimization: an N-particle approach to protein structure refinement (2003)
- Doctoral advisor: Piet Gros
- Website: www2.mrc-lmb.cam.ac.uk/group-leaders/n-to-s/sjors-scheres/

Sjors Hendrik Willem Scheres FRS (born 1975) is a Dutch scientist at the MRC Laboratory of Molecular Biology (LMB) Cambridge, UK. Since 2018, he has jointly led the LMB's Structural Studies Division.

== Education ==
Scheres studied Chemistry at Utrecht University in The Netherlands, and spent nine months at the European Synchrotron Radiation Facility in France for his undergraduate research thesis. He then came back to Utrecht University for his DPhil in Protein Crystallography, which was supervised by Piet Gros.

== Career ==
Scheres worked as a Postdoctoral researcher at the Spanish National Center for Biotechnology (CNB) with José Maria Carazo from 2003-2010, where he developed classification algorithms for Cryogenic electron microscopy (cryo-EM) images based on Maximum likelihood estimation. In 2010 Scheres was appointed as a group leader at the MRC Laboratory of Molecular Biology, Cambridge. There, he extended his maximum-likelihood methods to a general Empirical Bayes method for Protein structure determination by cryo-EM, which he implemented in the computer program RELION. In 2020, Scheres and collaborators used RELION to reach atomic resolution for a cryo-EM reconstruction of apo-Ferritin.

Besides developing algorithms for cryo-EM image processing, Scheres has also collaborated with experimental groups to solve important protein structures. For example, Xiaochen Bai, currently at UTSW, in his group solved the structure of human Gamma secretase in a collaboration with Shi Yigong. Since 2016, Scheres has worked closely together with Michel Goedert, who is also at the MRC Laboratory of Molecular Biology. Using cryo-EM image processing methods that were developed by Scheres, they solved the structure of Amyloid fibrils of Tau protein from the brain of an individual with Alzheimer's disease. Since then, Scheres and Goedert have also solved the cryo-EM structures of tau filaments from multiple other Tauopathies, as well as filaments of Amyloid beta from Alzheimer's disease, Alpha-synuclein from Multiple system atrophy and TMEM106B.

Scheres has been a member of the Board of Reviewing Editors for eLife since 2014. He has been joint Head of the Division of Structural Studies of the MRC Laboratory of Molecular Biology since 2018. In 2021, he was elected a Fellow of the Royal Society. In 2022, he was elected a foreign member of the Royal Netherlands Academy of Arts and Sciences and a Fellow of the Academy of Medical Sciences.

== Awards ==
- Leeuwenhoek Lecture of the Royal Society (2022)
- Bijvoet medal of the Bijvoet Center for Biomolecular Research (2018)
- Elected EMBO Member (2017)
- Gold medal KNCV (2015)
- Nature's 10 who mattered in 2014
