= Adolfo Lazzarini =

Paraguayan footballer (1952–2010)

Personal information
- Full name: Adolfo Lazzarini Osorio
- Date of birth: 7 May 1952
- Place of birth: Sauce, Corrientes, Argentina
- Date of death: 1 July 2010 (aged 58)
- Place of death: Asunción, Paraguay
- Height: 1.63 m (5 ft 4 in)
- Position: Forward

Senior career*
Years	Team	Apps	(Gls)
1972–1973	América de Pilar	?	(?)
1974	Olimpia	?	(?)
1975–1977	River Plate (Asunción)	?	(?)
1977	Libertad	?	(?)
1977–1978	Cruz Azul	18	(1)
1979	Olimpia	?	(?)
1980	LDU Quito	?	(?)
1982	Cerro Porteño PF	?	(?)

International career
1977	Paraguay	12	(?)
- * Club domestic league appearances and goals

Adolfo Lazzarini Osorio (7 May 1952 – 1 July 2010) was a naturalized Paraguayan footballer who played as a winger.

== Career ==
Born in Sauce, Corrientes, Lazzarini moved from Argentina to the Paraguayan city of Pilar where he played for local Club America in 1972. In 1974, he was transferred to Olimpia Asunción and afterwards he played for various clubs such as River Plate (Asunción), Libertad and Cruz Azul of Mexico before returning to Olimpia in 1979, year in which the team won the Copa Libertadores. He then played, in 1980, for LDU Quito and came back to Paraguay, in 1982, to play for Cerro Porteño of Presidente Franco to put an end to his career.

Since Lazzarini acquired to Paraguayan citizenship at a young age, he was able to play a twelve matches for the Paraguay national football team.

== Personal ==
In 2010, Lazzarini died following a long illness in Asunción.

== Titles ==
Season	Team	Title
1979	Olimpia	Copa Libertadores
1979	Olimpia	Paraguayan 1st division
