= Maria Grazia Spillantini =

Italian neuroscientist

Maria Grazia Spillantini FRS FMedSci
- Born: Caprese Michelangelo, Italy
- Education: University of Florence, University of Cambridge
- Spouse: Michel Goedert
- Children: 1 son
- Awards: Potamkin Prize of the American Academy of Neurology (2000) Fellow of the Academy of Medical Sciences (2010) Fellow of the Royal Society (2013) Camillo Golgi Medal (2017) Ufficiale dell'Ordine della Stella d'Italia (2019) Tudichum Medal (2020)
- Scientific career
- Fields: Neurodegenerative diseases
- Workplaces: University of Florence; INSERM; MRC Laboratory of Molecular Biology; University of Cambridge
- Thesis: Molecular neuropathology of Alzheimer's disease (1993)
- Doctoral advisor: Aaron Klug
- Other academic advisors: Rita Levi-Montalcini
- Website: www.neuroscience.cam.ac.uk/directory/profile.php?mgs11 -

Maria Grazia Spillantini is Professor of Molecular Neurology in the Department of Clinical Neurosciences at the University of Cambridge. She is most noted for identifying the protein alpha-synuclein as the major component of Lewy bodies, the characteristic protein deposit found in the brain in Parkinson's disease and dementia with Lewy bodies. She has also identified mutations in the MAPT gene as a heritable cause for frontotemporal dementia.

== Education ==
Spillantini completed a laurea in biological sciences at the University of Florence, graduating summa cum laude. She remained at the University of Florence, moving to the Department of Clinical Pharmacology to conduct research. After research posts at INSERM Unité de Neurobiologie in Paris and the Molecular Neurobiology Unit of the Medical Research Council in Cambridge UK, she began her PhD at the Laboratory of Molecular Biology. Spillantini was affiliated with Peterhouse during this time. She was awarded a PhD in molecular biology in 1993. Spillantini is Fellow of Clare Hall, Cambridge since 1994.

== Career and research ==
Spillantini was interviewed for a young researchers fellowship in 1991 by Nobel prize winner Rita Levi-Montalcini. On Levi-Montalcini's death in 2013, Spillantini told The Scientist magazine, “I was very nervous because she was a very well-known scientist. And it was really for me one of nicest experiences because she was really down to earth.”

As of 2019, Spillantini is based at the University of Cambridge, where she is Professor of Molecular Neurology at the Department of Clinical Neurosciences. Her research examines the mechanisms leading to neurodegeneration in diseases such as Alzheimer's disease, Parkinson's disease and frontotemporal dementia. In particular her work studies the role of microtubule-associated protein tau and alpha-synuclein aggregation in the neurodegenerative process.

Throughout her career, Spillantini has conducted a wide variety of research. In fact, Spillantini has upwards of 240 publications in the field of neuroscience. In 2014, Spillantini and her colleague Aviva Tolkovsky received a NC3Rs Project grant. Following this, they made advances in the way scientists are able to mimic Alzheimer's in mice, minimizing the amount of mice necessary. Spillantini and her team have also conducted studies on emrusolmin (anle138b), an experimental drug that affects clumping of alpha-synuclein. They treated mice with alpha-synuclein clumping- similar to what is seen in Parkinson's disease- with emrusolmin, and observed a reduction in this clumping. In 2022, Spillantini and Tolkovsky gained additional funding from Alzheimer's Research UK for their research concerning dementia. This funding goes towards Spillantini's studies on MMP3, an enzyme whose activity is potentially connected to dementia and other related diseases.

Her research has led to a greater understanding of a variety of neurodegenerative diseases, and has created new possibilities for therapies that target these diseases.
