= Alice Lazzarini =

Scientist, author and researcher

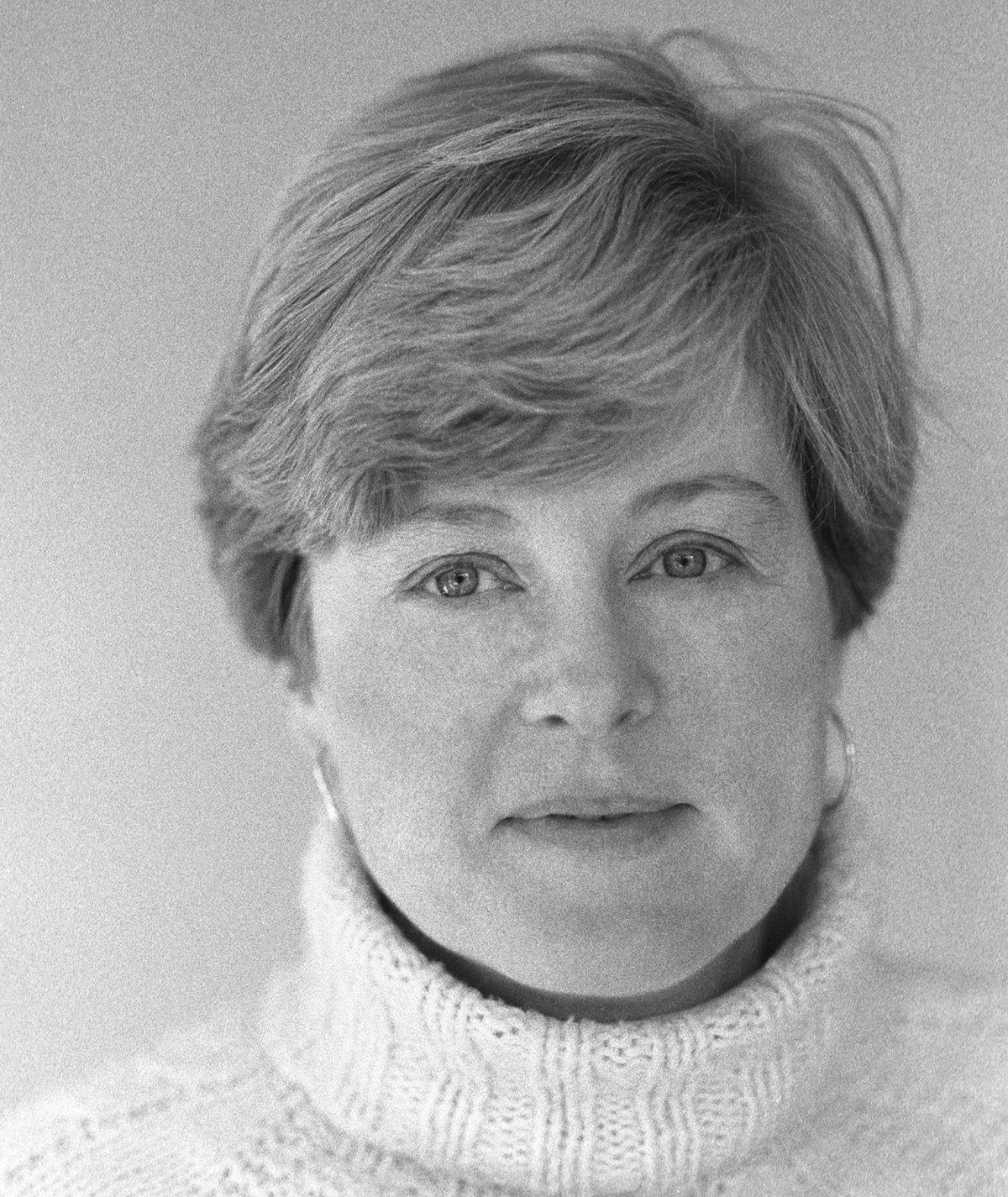
- Lazzarini in 1990
- Known for: Parkinson's disease research
- Scientific career
- Fields: Geneticist
- Institutions: Robert Wood Johnson Medical School
- Website: Lazzarini's blog

Alice M. Lazzarini is a scientist, author and researcher on neurogenetic disorders, including Huntington's disease and Parkinson's disease. She is an assistant professor of Neurology at Rutgers Robert Wood Johnson Medical School (RWJMS, previously known as University of Medicine and Dentistry of New Jersey or UMDNJ), where her work helped establish the genetic basis of Parkinson's. Later in life, she was diagnosed with Parkinson's—the very disease she had spent decades researching.

== Huntington's disease ==
Lazzarini is a geneticist, who worked in New Jersey as a genetics counselor and coordinator at Middlesex General-University Hospital's Huntington's Disease Family Service Center, serving individuals with HD and their families. The News Tribune said in 1985 that it was "one of a handful of multi-disciplinary facilities in the country where various specialists join[ed] forces to address the problems faced by victims and their relatives ... serv[ing] more than 200 families since its opening in 1979". Lazzarini helped lobby the New Jersey assembly for a bill to establish a residential facility for HD patients.

== Genetic disease research ==
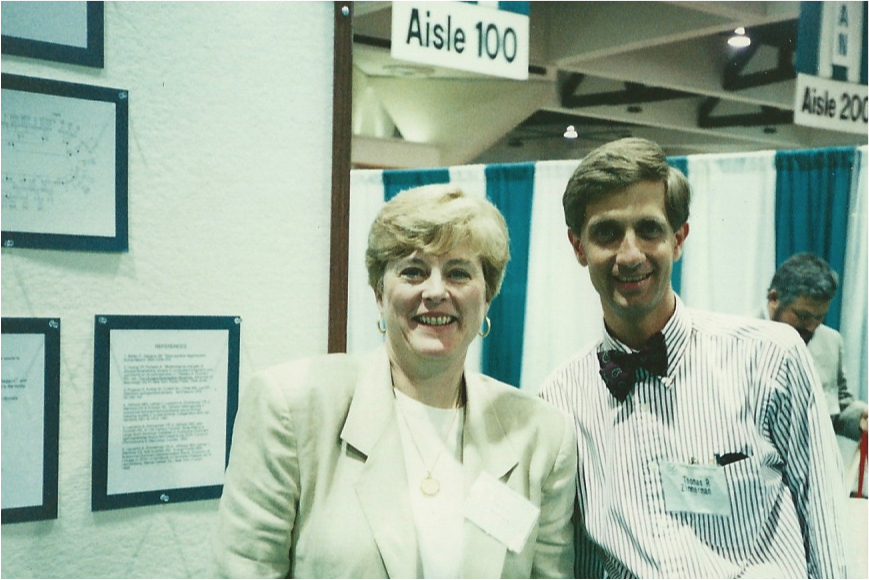
Alice Lazzarini and Thomas Zimmerman with their poster for Machado-Joseph ataxia at the American Academy of Neurology meeting, 1992

Lazzarini was recruited in 1990 to study ataxia as part of the RWJMS new William Dow Lovett Center for Neurogenetics. In the early 90s, she was a member of the team studying neurodegenerative syndromes including olivopontocerebellar atrophy (a degeneration of neurons in the brain present in syndromes such as Machado-Joseph disease) and spinocerebellar ataxia (SCA). To study the causes of SCA, the researchers first had to locate a family having a large number of members with the disease; according to UMDNJ, Lazzarini "established a pedigree that may be the largest in North America". One of Lazzarini's patients had located family records that led to a hundreds of individuals in one family encompassing eight generations and including 21 members who had the disease. Lazzarini located another physician who was following a distant cousin of the same family, yielding a combined pedigree of thousands of family members dating to the 17th century. In the 1995 "W" Family Newsletter published by the UMDNJ-RWJMS Department of Neurology, Division of Neurogenetics, Lazzarini wrote: "We have found the 'W' [Whipple] family gene! ...

While observing large family trees with many individuals having ataxia, Lazzarini noticed that many family members also had restless legs syndrome. Lazzarini is published in the fields of X-linked intellectual disability and other neurologic disorders such as restless legs syndrome, Charcot–Marie–Tooth disease, and prion diseases. She has been a contributor as well to the literature on genetic counseling.

== Parkinson's disease ==
Lazzarini was a member of The GenePD Study, a 20-site research collaboration to identify genetic factors influencing Parkinson's disease (PD). Studying familial aggregation in a large group of family members with PD, she determined that a subset of Parkinson's cases are familial. She was the head author on a paper published in 1994 pinpointing a genetic component to PD; according to the UMDNJ Science blog, "she defined the pattern of inheritance in 80 multicase families".

Years earlier, the neurology clinic at RWJMS had located a family of Italian origin that encompassed at least five generations of more than 400 individuals and at least 60 members with PD. Lazzarini began studying the family whose ancestors were traced to the small village of Contursi, Italy. In 1995, the RWJMS team joined with the National Center for Human Genome Research at the National Institutes of Health to take advantage of the laboratory resources available from the NIH in an effort to locate the gene causing PD in the Contursi family. Collecting samples from patients in Italy, Lazzarini was a member of the team that reported the first Parkinson disease-causing mutation (PARK1) in the brain protein, alpha-synuclein. Lazzarini worked with the Italian Instituto de Scienze Neurologiche to get blood samples from the family members in Italy whose relatives in the US were also being studied; she "pounded the pavement" to get samples from strangers, sometimes meeting resistance. Once she "witnessed what seemed to be a vicious argument, carried out in Italian with hand gestures aplenty"; the 80-year-old woman whose sample was needed was afraid of needles, but eventually allowed her blood to be taken.

The findings by the team, including scientists from the NIH and UMDNJ-RWJMS, were published in Science magazine. The New York Times reported that "scientists said that finding a site for the gene should help in finding other genetic factors that contribute to Parkinson's disease, which should eventually help in developing diagnostic tests and treatments". For ten years, Lazzarini and her colleagues had studied several generations of the large Italian-American family to establish the genetic basis of PD; "they believed[d] that fragments of alpha-synuclein bind to other proteins to form the Lewy body, an insoluble proteinaceous material characteristic of Parkinson's disease". In less than a year, the NIH and the UMDNJ-RWJMS team of Roger Duvoisin, William Johnson, Lawrence Golbe and Alice Lazzarini, working with the NIH and colleagues in Italy, had linked PD to DNA markers on chromosome 4. Within days of the publication of the PARK1 findings, alpha-synuclein was discovered to be the major component of Lewy bodies within brain cells of PD patients; according to the UMDNJ magazine, "This discovery changed the direction of research into PD by providing scientists with an entirely new protein whose manufacture, function or breakdown could be the key to the disease."

== Personal life ==
Lazzarini was diagnosed with PD, the very disease she had spent a decade researching. She published a memoir chronicling her journey since being diagnosed.
