= Mihael Polymeropoulos =

Greek-American physician, scientist, (b 1960)

Mihael H. Polymeropoulos (born February 27, 1960) is a Greek-American physician and scientist. He is known for his work in the Human Genome Project and the discovery of mutations in the alpha synuclein gene as the first genetic cause of Parkinson's disease while at the National Institutes of Health. He is currently the CEO and Chairman of the Board of Vanda Pharmaceuticals a publicly traded company based in Washington DC which he co-founded in 2003.

== Early scientific career and research accomplishments ==
After graduating from the University of Patras School of Medicine at age 23, he pursued his passion for molecular genetics research and joined the laboratory of Dr Sankar Adhya at the National Cancer Institute of the National Institutes of Health. At the NCI he studied the molecular regulation of transcription of the bacterial galactose operon of E. Coli through the interaction of the galactose repressor molecule with the two galactose operator sites. He continued his training and completed a residency in Psychiatry at the National Institutes of Mental Health, St Elizabeth's Hospital in Washington DC.

From 1988 to 1998 he focused his research on the study of human genetics and by developing microsatellite genetic markers that aided in the development of genetic maps for the Human Genome Project. He co-founded the IMAGE consortium an international consortium for the identification and mapping of all human genome transcripts with Charles Auffray, Bento Soares and Gregg Lennon.

He joined the National Human Genome Research Institute where he concentrated on the identification and mapping of human disease. He identified the genetic location of numerous genetic disorders including the gene for Wolfram disorder, pyknodysostosis, Ellis van Creveld syndrome, proximal symphalangism, cavernous hemangiomas, Neimann Pick Type C among others. In 1996 he published on the mapping of the first genetic locus for Parkinson's disease and in 1997 he reported on the identification of mutation in the alpha synuclein gene in a group of Italian and Greek pedigrees. This discovery ushered a new era in the understanding of the molecular underpinnings of Parkinson's disease and other neurodegenerative disorders collectively now known as synucleinopathies. His 1997 publication on the alpha synuclein mutation in Parkinson's disease families is one of the most cited publications in this field with over 10,000 citations to date.
