= Monte Raione =

Mountain in Italy

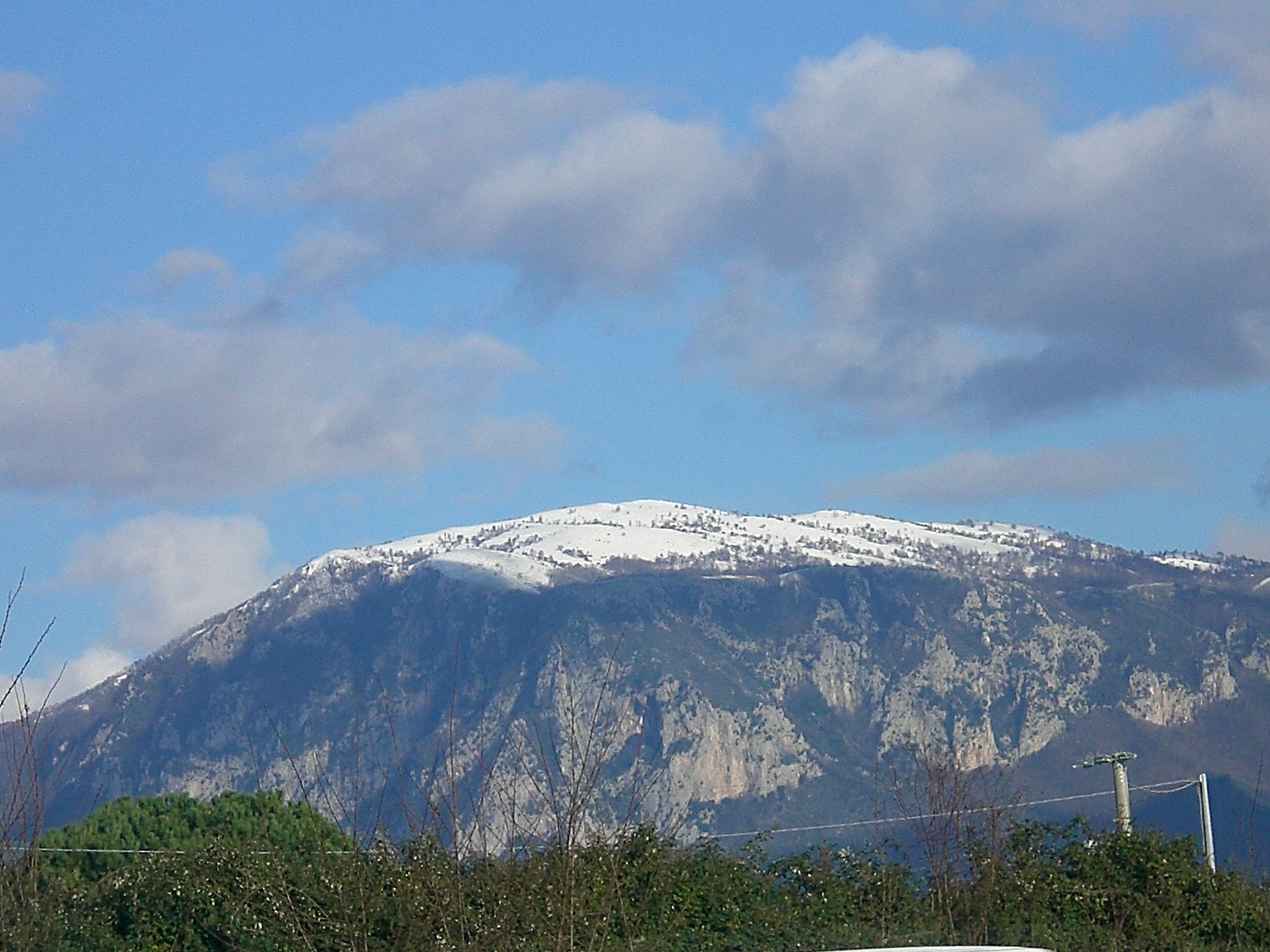
- Mount Raione.

Highest point
- Elevation: 1,200 m (3,900 ft)
- Coordinates: 40°24′09″N 15°01′52″E

Geography
- Location within Italy
- Location: Campania, Italy
- Parent range: Apennines

Monte Raione is a mountain of Campania, Italy. It has an elevation of 1,014 metres above sea level.
