= TauRx Therapeutics =

Pharmaceutical company

- Industry: Pharmaceuticals, Life Sciences
- Founded: Singapore (2002)
- Founder: Claude Wischik; K. M. Seng
- Headquarters: Singapore, Singapore
- Number of locations: Singapore and Aberdeen, Scotland
- Key people: Claude Wischik, Executive Chairman; Shay Way Seng, Managing Director
- Website: TauRx Therapeutics

TauRx Therapeutics Ltd (/ˈtaʊrɛks/) is a life sciences/pharmaceutical company incorporated in Singapore with primary research facilities and operations in Aberdeen, Scotland.

The company was co-founded in 2002 by the late gynecologist, surgeon and venture capitalist K. M. Seng and Claude Wischik, Professor of Old Age Psychiatry at the University of Aberdeen, Scotland, who is currently the company's Executive Chairman.

The company's protein aggregation inhibitors target the underlying pathology of dementia, with the aim of modifying or halting disease progression. Their lead compound, LMTX, targets aggregation of tau and is believed to act on synuclein, TDP-43 and huntingtin protein. Its primary development in Alzheimer's disease is focused in its activity as a Tau aggregation inhibitor (TAI).

== History ==
In 1988, while at Cambridge University, Wischik and coworkers discovered that abnormal fibres of tau protein form inside nerve cells in patients with Alzheimer's disease, and that their aggregation into tau tangles correlates to the development of dementia. In 1997, Wischik and his team moved to the University of Aberdeen, where they continued their research into tau pathology and protein aggregation inhibition. In 2002, the company was formed as a spin-out of the University of Aberdeen.

Methylthioninium chloride – a first generation tau aggregation inhibitor (TAI) was used in Phase 2 clinical trials in Alzheimer's. The Phase 2 compared 3 dosages of methylthioninium chloride).

In 2012, Phase 3 clinical trials were starting with leucomethylthioninium salts (LMTX) for mild and moderate Alzheimer's disease and behavioral variant FTD (bvFTD).

== LMTX ==
LMTX is a stable anhydrous reduced form of methylthioninium chloride. (Chloride is replaced by bromide or methanesulfonate.) One of these is undergoing a phase 3 clinical trial for safety and efficacy in mild Alzheimer's disease as "TRx0237". The results of the trial were released in July 2016. As a whole, patients who participated in the trial did not show significant benefits from receiving the LMTX.

TauRx has presented a post-hoc subgroup analysis suggesting that a small group of patients in the trial, who were taking only LMTX without any other Alzheimer's medication, did show significant improvement. However, this characterization of the secondary analysis results has been challenged on statistical grounds, and based on the fact that an inappropriate placebo group was used in the comparison.
