= Konstantin Tretiakoff =

Russian neurologist

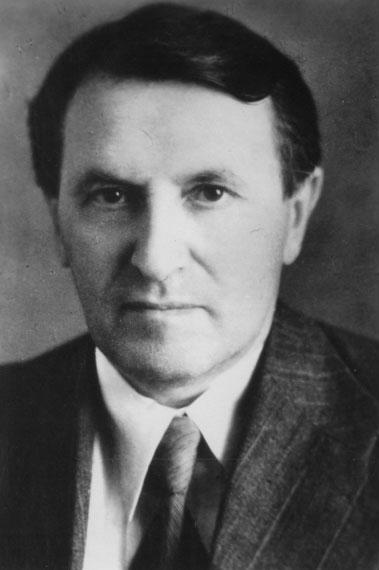
- Konstantin Tretiakoff
- Born: December 26, 1892; Fergana, Uzbekistan
- Died: 1958 (aged 65–66)
- Known for: Parkinson's disease
- Scientific career
- Fields: Neuropathology

Konstantin Nikolaevitch Tretiakoff (Russian: Константин Николаевич Третьяков; December 26, 1892 – 1958) was a Russian neuropathologist. He was born in Fergana, Uzbekistan, as a son of military physician, who was member of Pierre Bonvalot's first Pamir expedition. He studied medicine in L'Assistance Publique des Hopitaux de Paris. He received his doctorate in 1919. In his thesis, he described degeneration of the substantia nigra associated with paralysis agitans (Parkinson disease). Tretiakof was first to link this anatomic structure with parkinsonism. Between 1922 and 1926 Tretiakoff worked at the Hospício de Juquery, near the city of São Paulo, Brazil. In 1931, he was appointed Chairman at the new Department of Neuropathology at the Medical Institute in Saratov, USSR, where he spent the rest of his life.

In 1910, Fritz Heinrich Lewy discovered what became known as Lewy bodies, and compared them to earlier findings by Gonzalo Rodríguez Lafora. In 1913, Lafora described another case, and acknowledged Lewy as the discoverer, naming them cuerpos intracelulares de Lewy (intracellular Lewy bodies). Trétiakoff found them in 1919 in the substantia nigra of PD brains, called them corps de Lewy (Lewy bodies) and is credited with the eponym. Eliasz Engelhardt argued in 2017 that Lafora should be credited with the eponym, because he named them six years before Trétiakoff.
