= Isabella Lazzarini =

Medieval historian

Isabella Lazzarini (Mantua, 1964) is a medieval historian. Her research interests focus on the political, social, and cultural history of late medieval Italy, with an emphasis on Renaissance diplomacy, the growth of different political languages in documentary sources, and - more recently - gender studies.

She studied at the Scuola Normale Superiore (as an undergraduate student, 1983-1987; as a PhD student in Medieval History, a.a. 1991-1992, tutors Giorgio Chittolini, Marino Berengo, Anthony Mohlo) and at the University of Pisa (as an undergraduate student: degree in Renaissance History, a.a. 1987-1988, tutors Cathy Isaacs, Elena Fasano Guarini, co-tutor Giorgio Chittolini). She has taught Medieval history at the University of Molise and is now full professor of medieval history at the University of Turin.

She has been a Leverhulme Trust visiting professor (2011) and a Marie Curie COFUND senior research fellow at the University of Durham (Jan.-March 2012); a visiting fellow at All Souls College, Oxford (Sept.-Dec. 2012) and a professeure invitée at the Ecole Nationale des Chartes, Paris (2014), at Paris IV Sorbonne (Chaire Dupront, 2020) and at Paris 1 Panthéon-Sorbonne (2022).

== Bibliography ==
- L’Italia degli stati territoriali (secoli XIII-XV), Bari-Rome, Laterza, 2003
- Amicizia e potere. Reti politiche e sociali nell’Italia medievale, Milan, Bruno Mondadori, 2010
- The Italian Renaissance State, Andrea Gamberini and Isabella Lazzarini. Cambridge University Press, 2012.
- Communication and Conflict: Italian Diplomacy in the Early Renaissance, 1350–1520. Oxford University Press, 2015.
- Italian Renaissance Diplomacy: A Sourcebook, eds. Monica Azzolini and Isabella Lazzarini (Pontifical Institute of Mediaeval Studies, 2017).
- Social Mobility in Medieval Italy (1100-1500), eds. Sandro Carocci and Isabella Lazzarini, Rome, Viella, 2018
- A Cultural History of Peace. The Renaissance. Bloomsbury Publishing, 2020.
- The Later Middle Ages, Short Oxford History of Europe, Oxford, Oxford University Press, 2021
- L'ordine delle scritture. Il linguaggio documentario del potere nell'Italia tardomedievale, Rome, Viella, 2021

== See also ==
- University of Molise

•University of Turin

- Italian Renaissance
