= Contursi Terme =

- Comune
- Comune di Contursi Terme
- Coat of arms

- Location within Italy Location within Campania
- Coordinates: 40°38′N 15°14′E
- Country: Italy
- Region: Campania
- Province: Salerno (SA)
- Frazioni: Bagni di Contursi, Pagliarini, Toppe, Piana, Monte di Pruno, Iannamici, Prato, Ponte Mefita, Saginara, San Pietro, Serroni

Government
  - Mayor: Antonio Briscione

Area
  - Total: 28.90 km^{2} (11.16 sq mi)
- Elevation: 250 m (820 ft)

Population (31 August 2007)
  - Total: 3,281
  - Density: 113.5/km^{2} (294.0/sq mi)
- Demonym: Contursini
- Time zone: UTC+1 (CET)
  - Summer (DST): UTC+2 (CEST)
- Postal code: 84024
- Dialing code: 0828
- ISTAT code: 065046
- Patron saint: Saint Donatus
- Saint day: 7 August
- Website: Official website

Contursi Terme (Contursano: Cundurs) is a village and comune in the province of Salerno in the Campania region of south-western Italy.

== Early history ==
No secure identification of Contursi Terme, where ancient remains confirm a settlement at the confluence of the Tanagro (ancient Tanager) with the Sele, is likely. The Roman Ursentum noted in Pliny's Natural History (III.2), is more usually identified with Caggiano. The local historian A. Filomarino, based on etymologies of toponyms, placed the commune's origins as early as the fourth century AD, the result of efforts by the inhabitants of the former Saginara and Contursi to fortify a site that was destroyed by Alaric's Goths at the end of the fourth century. Under the Lombards it appears to have belonged to the gastaldate of Conza, when a fortress was built in 840 by Orso, count of Conza, from whom the stronghold probably took its name Castrum comitis Ursi, the "castle of count Orso") Orso took the part of his kinsman Siconulf of Salerno (839–51) in internecine wars with Radelchis I of Benevento, who had been a former gastaldo of Conza.

The later history of Contursi Termi formed a local part of the Principality of Salerno, which was retained as a title until the territory was divided in three by Charles II of Naples in 1287, Contursi passing to the prince of Citerione (or Citra) and held by the family Sanseverino. In 1348, Contursi was taken by Louis of Taranto, king of Naples by right of his wife Joanna; he passed the title to his adherents, the Origlia. In 1448 Antonio Sanseverino succeeded in reclaiming title to Contursi, but the Sanseverino heirs held it only until the early sixteenth century, under the Viceroys of Naples. From the seventeenth century the commune passed successively through a number of families, the Bernalli, Pepe, Ludovisi and Parisani Bonanno. The last to hold the contado before the reunification of Italy were the Pisani di Tolentino, marchesi di Caggiano.

== The thermal springs ==
The thermal baths, insecurely linked to notices by Roman writers, were described in a manuscript Balnea Contursi of 1231; The fifteen thermal springs, with varying mineral content, have retained their curative reputation, for bathing, both in warm pools and in a cold plunge, and for drinking.

== Parkinson's disease ==
Families from the village have played an important role in the understanding of Parkinson's disease. In 1986, Larry Golbe, a doctor based at the University of Medicine and Dentistry of New Jersey, came across a family with six Parkinson's patients, and found that they had originated in Contursi. A few months later he found a second family with several Parkinson's patients, who also had ancestors from the village. This prompted Golbe to collaborate with Giuseppe DiIorio at the University of Naples, to analyse the DNA from Contursani and people who had emigrated from the village across the world. They identified three families in Italy and three families in the US, all of whom were descendants from a single couple who lived in Contursi in the late 17th and early 18th centuries. Of 400 members of this extended family, known as the "Contursi kindred", 61 are known to have had Parkinson's. This showed for the first time that Parkinson's could be inherited.

Geneticists Alice Lazzarini and William Johnson worked through the early 1990s trying to isolate the mutation that caused the disease. In 1996, a team led by Mihael Polymeropoulos at the National Institutes of Health located by linkage analysis the Parkinson's disease gene of the Contursi kindred on the long arm of human chromosome 4. In 1997, the same team identified a point mutation in the alpha-synuclein gene in the Contursi kindred as well as Greek pedigrees with Parkinson's disease. The NIH team and a team led by Maria Grazia Spillantini reported on alpha-synuclein deposits in Lewy bodies as well as alpha-synuclein inclusions in other neurodegenerative disorders.
