= Frederic Lewy =

American neurologist (1885–1950)

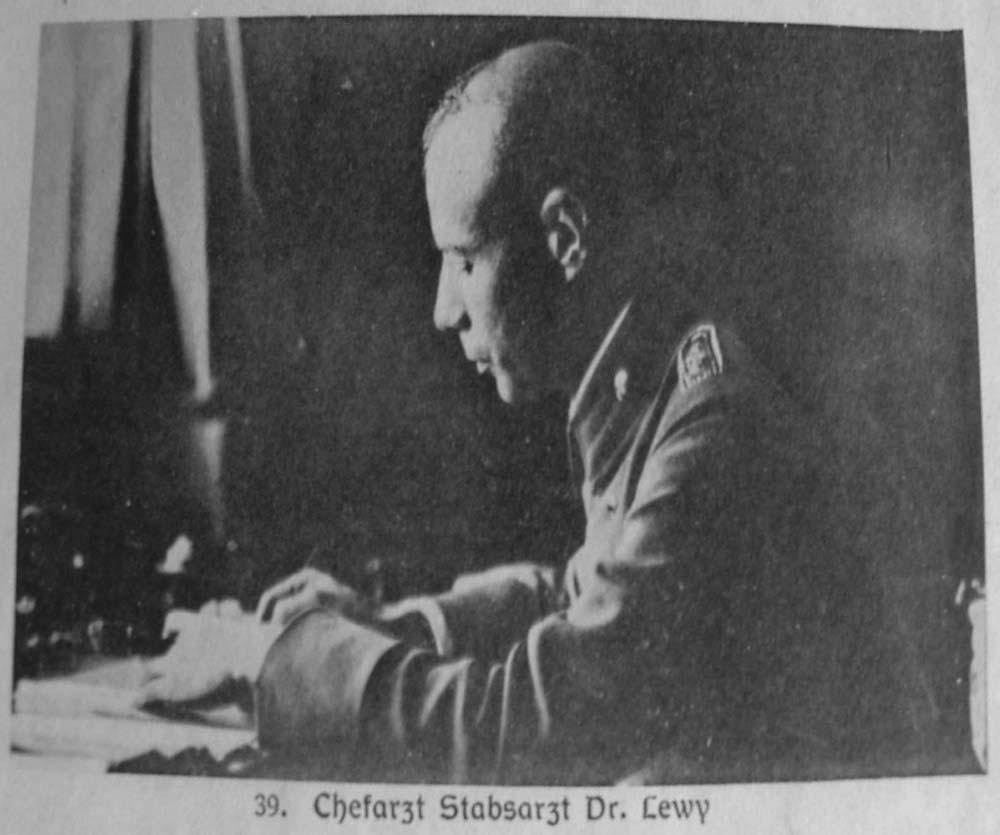
- Lewy c. 1920
- Born: Friedrich Heinrich Lewy; January 28, 1885; Berlin, German Empire
- Died: October 5, 1950 (aged 65); Haverford, Pennsylvania, United States
- Resting place: Haverford Friends, Haverford, Pennsylvania
- Other name: Fritz Lewy
- Occupation: Neurologist
- Known for: Lewy bodies

Friedrich "Fritz" Heinrich Lewy (/ ˈlɛvi/; January 28, 1885 – October 5, 1950), known in his later years as Frederic Henry Lewey, was a German-born American neurologist. He is best known for the discovery of Lewy bodies, which are a characteristic indicator of Parkinson's disease and dementia with Lewy bodies. In a 1912 paper based on work in Alois Alzheimer’s Munich laboratory he described intraneuronal inclusion bodies in brainstem nuclei of patients with paralysis agitans that were later termed Lewy bodies.

Lewy was born to a Jewish family in Berlin, Germany, on January 28, 1885. He attended the Friedrichswerdersches Gymnasium in Berlin; in 1903 he began studies of medicine at the University of Berlin and the University of Zürich. On February 11, 1910, he received his doctorate from the University of Berlin with a thesis titled "Degenerationsversuche am akustischen System des Kaninchens und der Katze. Zugleich ein Beitrag zur Anwendung der Marchischen Methode" (Degeneration Experiments on the Auditory System of the Rabbit and the Cat: A Contribution to the Application of the Marchi Method). From 1909 to 1910, Lewy served as an assistant at the Institute of Physiology at the University of Breslau (Wrocław, Poland), and from 1910 to 1912, he worked at the University Psychiatric Clinic in Munich under Alois Alzheimer. In 1912, he accompanied Alzheimer to Breslau. In 1914, Lewy spent a brief period working with Ludwig Edinger at the Frankfurt Institute for Brain Research.

He worked in Alois Alzheimer's Munich laboratory and was contemporary with Hans Gerhard Creutzfeldt (1885–1964), Alfons Maria Jakob (1884–1931) and Ugo Cerletti (1877–1963). In 1933, he fled Nazi Germany and moved to the United States. Lewy died in Haverford, Pennsylvania, on October 5, 1950, aged 65.
