= Eboli =

- Comune
- Comune di Eboli
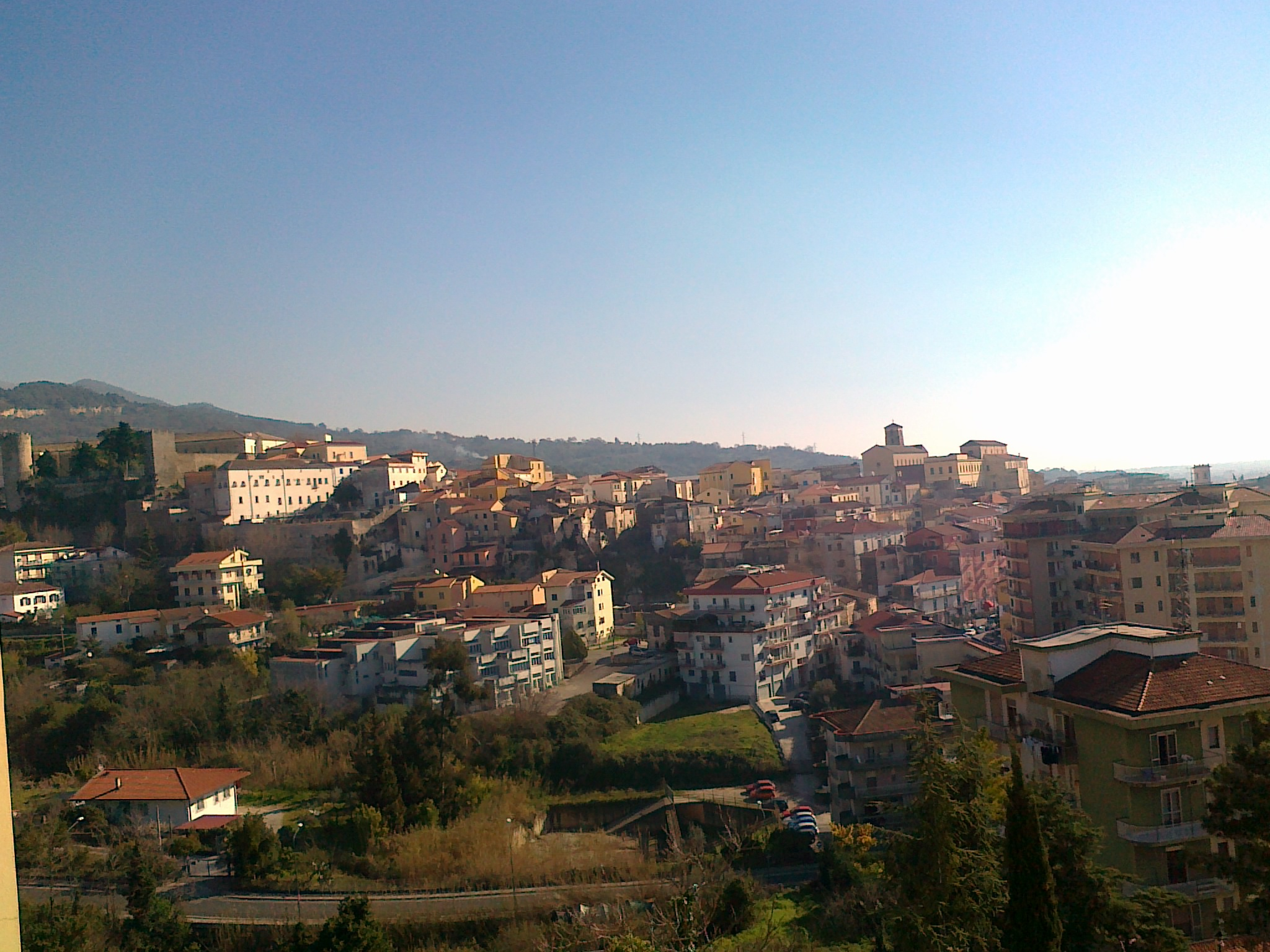

- Coat of arms

- Location within Italy Location within Campania
- Coordinates: 40°36′58.53″N 15°03′17.69″E
- Country: Italy
- Region: Campania
- Province: Salerno (SA)
- Frazioni: Campolongo, Cioffi, Corno d'oro, Fiocche, Santa Cecilia, Taverna Nova

Government
  - Mayor: Mario Conte (Article One)

Area
  - Total: 138.7 km^{2} (53.6 sq mi)
- Elevation: 145 m (476 ft)

Population (31 May 2022)
  - Total: 37,488
  - Density: 270.3/km^{2} (700.0/sq mi)
- Demonym: Ebolitani
- Time zone: UTC+1 (CET)
  - Summer (DST): UTC+2 (CEST)
- Postal code: 84020, 82025
- Dialing code: 0828
- ISTAT code: 065050
- Patron saint: Saint Vitus
- Saint day: 15 June
- Website: Official website

Eboli (Ebolitano: Jevule) is a town and comune of Campania, southern Italy, in the province of Salerno.

Eboli, an agricultural centre, is renowned for its olive oil and dairy products, most notably the famous buffalo mozzarella from the area.

== History ==
Archaeological excavations have shown that the Eboli area has been inhabited since the Copper and Bronze Ages. Also attested (starting from the 5th century BC) was the presence of the so-called Villanovan civilization.

The ancient Eburum was a Lucanian city, mentioned by Pliny the Elder, not far away from the Campanian border. It laid above the Via Popilia, which followed the line taken by the modern railway. The Romans gave it the status of municipium.

The town was destroyed first by Alaric I in 410 AD, and then by the Saracens in the 9th and 10th centuries. Later it served as a stronghold of the Principality of Salerno, with a massive castle built by Robert Guiscard.

During the 1930s Eboli was able to expand into the plain after a project of land reclamation carried out by the Fascist government. It was severely damaged during the 1980 Irpinia earthquake.

== Geography ==
Eboli is located at the feet of Montedoro, a peripheral spur of the Monte Raione-Monte Ripalta group. Its territory, which is 90% plain, is formed by the alluvial plain of the Sele river, which bounds it southwards. The remaining part comprises hills part of the Monti Picentini Regional Park.

Eboli borders with Albanella, Battipaglia, Campagna, Capaccio, Olevano sul Tusciano and Serre. Its hamlets (frazioni) are Campolongo, Cioffi, Corno d'oro, Fiocche, Santa Cecilia and Taverna Nova.

== Main sights ==
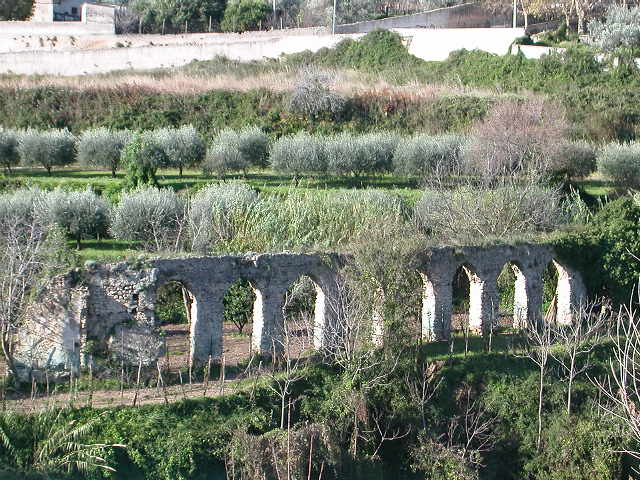
Remaining arches of the Roman aqueduct.

The main attraction is the Colonna castle (11th century). Scanty remains of the ancient polygonal walls (4th century BC) can still be seen, as well as of a Roman imperial villa in the locality of Paterno. Eboli is also home to several 15th–16th-century palazzi.

The sacristy of St. Francis contains two 14th-century pictures, one by Roberto d'Oderisio of Naples.

Notable is the Basilica of St. Peter Alli Marmi, (1076) located at the bottom of the hill of Montedoro, where the old medieval site of the city was situated.

== Culture ==
A local saying, Cristo si è fermato a Eboli ('Christ stopped at Eboli'), was used by 20th-century writer Carlo Levi as the title of a book, referring to the enduring poverty in Basilicata. Eboli was the location where the road and railway to Basilicata branched away from the coastal north–south routes.

Secondary schools based in Eboli are:

- Istituto di Istruzione Superiore "Perito-Levi" (liceo classico, liceo artistico, and liceo musicale e coreutico)
- Liceo scientifico "A. Gallotta"
- Istituto di Istruzione Superiore "Mattei-Fortunato" (istituto tecnico, istituto professionale)
- Liceo delle Scienze Umane Piaget (private)

== Twin Town ==
- Pastrana, Spain

== In media ==
There is a film based on the book (in English, Christ Stopped at Eboli).

It was reported in various news media that on 19 Jul 2026 freelance sports journalist and employee of the Regional Environmental Agency (Arpac) Luca Esposito was found murdered with his charred body discovered on farmland in the municipality of Eboli. Based on the evidence found, he is believed to have been shot to death and then his body burnt.

== Notable people ==
- Vito Coppola, dancer on Strictly Come Dancing.
- Filippo Gibbone (1880–), bishop.

== See also ==
- S.S. Ebolitana 1925
