= Lewy body =

Spherical inclusion commonly found in damaged neurons

Photomicrographs of regions of the substantia nigra in a patient with Parkinson's disease showing Lewy bodies (variously sized clumps in cell bodies) and Lewy neurites (thread-like structures in cell processes) stained immunohistochemically for the protein alpha-synuclein. The top panels are higher magnification images and the bottom panels lower magnification images of these abnormal cellular inclusions. Some neuromelanin-laden cells of the substantia nigra also are visible, particularly in the two righthand panels. Stains used: mouse monoclonal antibody to alpha-synuclein; counterstained with Mayer's haematoxylin. Scale bars are in the upper left panel for the top 2 images and the lower left panel for the bottom 2 images.

Lewy bodies are inclusion bodies – abnormal aggregations of protein – that develop inside neurons affected by Parkinson's disease, the Lewy body dementias (Parkinson's disease dementia and dementia with Lewy bodies (DLB)), and in several other disorders such as multiple system atrophy. The defining proteinaceous component of Lewy bodies is alpha-synuclein (α-synuclein), which aggregates to form Lewy bodies within neuronal cell bodies, and Lewy neurites in neuronal processes (axons or dendrites). In some disorders, alpha-synuclein also forms aggregates in glial cells that are referred to as 'glial cytoplasmic inclusions'; together, diseases involving Lewy bodies, Lewy neurites and glial cytoplasmic inclusions are called 'synucleinopathies'.

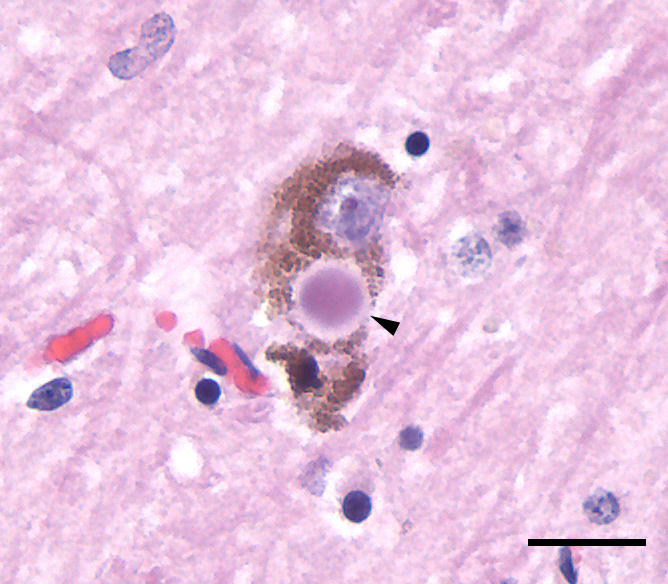
Photomicrograph of a Lewy body (indicated by the arrowhead) in a neuron of the substantia nigra from a person with Parkinson's disease. The brown material in the cytoplasm is neuromelanin. Hematoxylin and eosin stain; scale bar=20 microns [0.02mm].

Lewy bodies appear as spherical masses in the neuronal cytoplasm that can displace other cellular components such as the nucleus and neuromelanin. A given neuron may contain one or more Lewy bodies. There are two main kinds of Lewy bodies – classical (brainstem-type) and cortical-type. Classical Lewy bodies occur most commonly in pigmented neurons of the brainstem, such as the substantia nigra and locus coeruleus, although they are not restricted to pigmented neurons. They are strongly eosinophilic structures ranging from 8-30 microns in diameter, and when viewed with a light microscope they are seen to consist of a dense core that is often surrounded by a pale shell. Electron microscopic analyses found that the core consists of a compact mass of haphazard filaments and various particles surrounded by a diffuse corona of radiating filaments. In contrast, cortical-type Lewy bodies are smaller, only faintly eosinophilic, and devoid of a surrounding halo with radial filaments. Cortical-type Lewy bodies occur in multiple regions of the cortex and in the amygdala. Cortical Lewy bodies are a distinguishing feature of dementia with Lewy bodies, but they may occasionally be seen in ballooned neurons characteristic of behavioural variant frontotemporal dementia and corticobasal degeneration, as well as in patients with other tauopathies.

== History ==
The structures that later became known as Lewy bodies were first described in neurons of the substantia nigra by G. Marinesco in 1902. In 1910, Fritz Heinrich Lewy was studying in Berlin for his doctorate. He noticed abnormalities in neurons similar to those described by Marinesco and compared them to earlier findings by Gonzalo Rodríguez Lafora. In 1913, Lafora described another case, and credited Lewy with their discovery, naming them cuerpos intracelulares de Lewy (intracellular Lewy bodies). Konstantin Nikolaevich Trétiakoff characterized the inclusions in 1919, calling them corps de Lewy, and he is credited with coining the eponym. In 1923, Lewy published his findings in a book, The Study on Muscle Tone and Movement. Including Systematic Investigations on the Clinic, Physiology, Pathology, and Pathogenesis of Paralysis agitans. Eliasz Engelhardt has argued that Lafora should be credited with the eponym because he named the inclusions six years before Trétiakoff. Nonetheless, Trétiakoff is the primary figure acknowledged for coining the term "Lewy bodies".

Dr. Lewy is said to have become interested in the study of neurology because of the discovery by Alois Alzheimer in 1906 that dementia is linked to specific changes in the brain (known as plaques and tangles). The third reported case of Alzheimer's disease had histological changes consistent with Lewy body disease. It is now known that Lewy bodies can be present in many disorders; for example, Lewy pathology sometimes coexists in the brain along with the plaques and tangles of Alzheimer's disease. Lewy bodies also are present, usually in smaller numbers, in some neurologically normal older individuals (a finding referred to as 'incidental Lewy body disease'). The significance of the pathology in these cases is uncertain, but it may be an early stage of Lewy body disease.

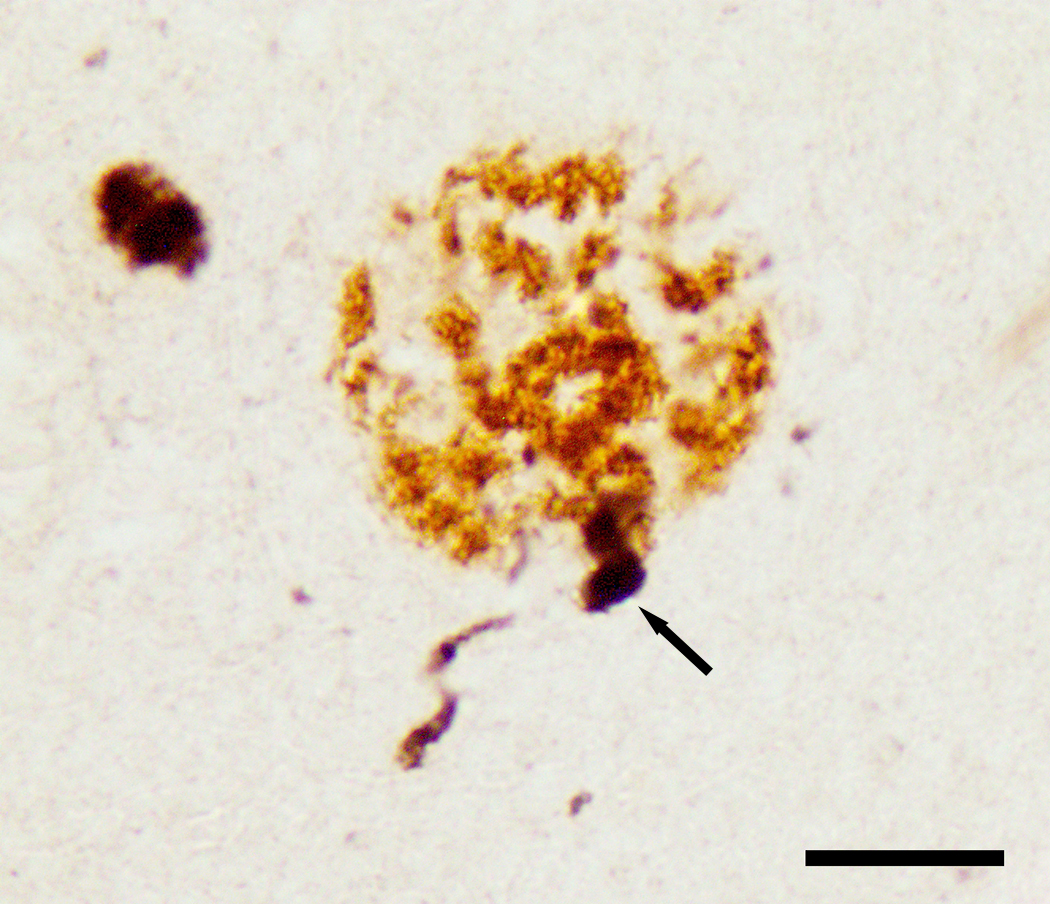
Photomicrograph of alpha-synuclein (black) in a Lewy body (upper left) and Lewy neurite (arrow) near an Abeta plaque (brown) in the brain of an elderly person who had died with dementia. Lewy pathology is sometimes present along with the plaques and tangles that are characteristic of Alzheimer's disease. Scale bar=20 microns [0.02mm].

== Cell biology ==
Photomicrograph of the dorsal motor nucleus of the vagus nerve (DmX) in a transverse section through the upper medulla that is affected by the abnormal deposition of alpha synuclein in Lewy bodies and Lewy neurites (righthand panel)

Lewy bodies are composed of the defining protein α-synuclein along with other proteins, such as ubiquitin, neurofilament protein, and alpha B crystallin. There is evidence that a particular protein family, called 14-3-3, plays a role in the formation of both cortical and classical Lewy bodies. Tau proteins also may be present, and Lewy bodies may occasionally be surrounded by neurofibrillary tangles. Lewy bodies and neurofibrillary tangles can occasionally co-exist in the same neuron, particularly in the amygdala. In addition to proteins, Lewy bodies also are rich in lipids, possibly from cellular components such as membrane fragments.

Alpha-synuclein modulates DNA repair processes, including repair of DNA double-strand breaks (DSBs) by the process of non-homologous end joining The repair function of alpha-synuclein appears to be greatly reduced in Lewy body-bearing neurons, and this reduction may trigger cell death. Genetic mutations are the reason behind their damaged repair function. One mutation in particular, in the gene encoding alpha-synuclein, was found to have been passed down from family members with Parkinson's disease. Furthermore, Lewy bodies retrieved from the brains of patients with Lewy body dementia were found to contain alpha-synuclein proteins that were shortened by mutations.

Lewy bodies are believed to represent an aggresome response in the cell. Many diseases result from the aggregation of misfolded proteins, including disorders that are associated with Lewy-type pathology. Aggregation is believed to occur when a large amount of misfolded proteins in the ubiquitin-proteasome pathway are incorporated into an aggresome. Since Lewy bodies contain ubiquitinated proteins that would be handled in the ubiquitin-proteasome pathway, they may be formed when the degradation pathway is overwhelmed by misfolded proteins. The aggresome thus may be an early stage in the formation of Lewy bodies.

The aggregation of alpha-synuclein, like that of many other disease-related proteins, is thought to be driven by a prion-like seeding mechanism. According to this hypothesis, normally produced alpha-synuclein is induced to misfold by contact with misfolded alpha-synuclein, resulting in the proliferation and spread of Lewy bodies and Lewy neurites among cells of the nervous system.

== Lewy neurites ==
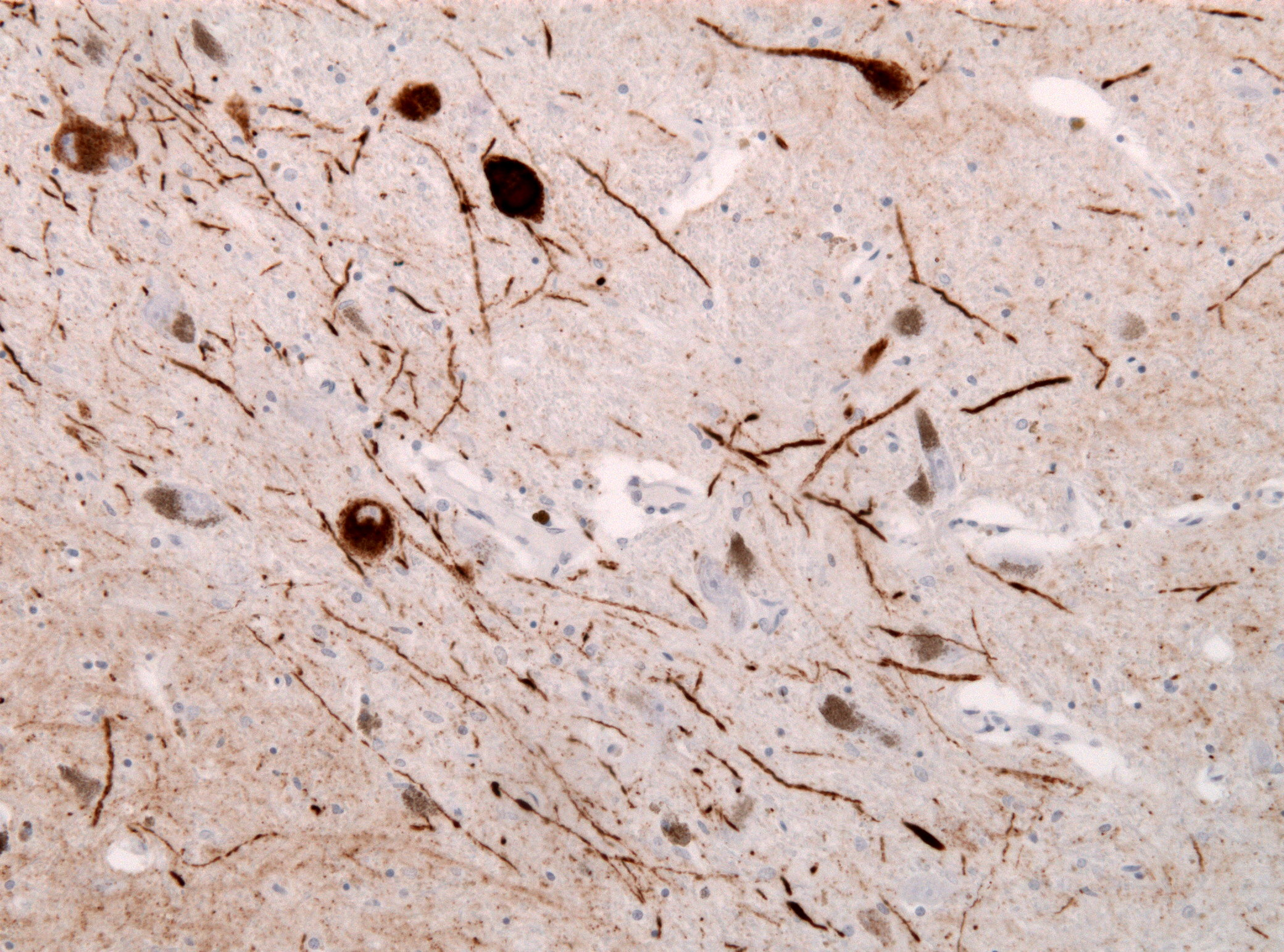
Lewy neurites (thread-like structures) and Lewy bodies in a case of Lewy body dementia. Stain: immunohistochemical stain (brown) for alpha-synuclein.

Lewy neurites are abnormal neuronal processes in diseased neurons; they contain granular material and abnormal α-synuclein filaments similar to those found in Lewy bodies. Like Lewy bodies, Lewy neurites are a feature of α-synucleinopathies such as dementia with Lewy bodies, Parkinson's disease, and multiple system atrophy, and they occur in many brain regions. In the hippocampal formation Lewy neurites are strongly associated with selective damage to the CA2-CA3 sectors, a characteristic that distinguishes Lewy body diseases from Alzheimer's disease.

== See also ==
- Lewy body dementia
- Proteinopathy
