= 1775 in science =

The year 1775 in science and technology involved some significant events.

== Biology ==
- The cheetah (Acinonyx jubatus) is described.

== Chemistry ==
- May 25 – Joseph Priestley's account of his isolation of oxygen in the form of a gas ("dephlogisticated air") is read to the Royal Society of London.
- Swedish chemist Torbern Bergman's De attractionibus electivis ("A Dissertation on Elective Attractions") is published, containing the largest tables of chemical affinity ever published.
- Swedish chemist Carl Wilhelm Scheele produces the toxic cupric hydrogen arsenite pigment Scheele's green.

== Exploration ==
- July 30 – 3-year second voyage of James Cook completed, the first eastabout global circumnavigation, during which the Antarctic Circle has been crossed three times, Terra Australis shown to be a myth, and Larcum Kendall's K1 chronometer demonstrated to be a reliable timekeeper for the purpose of calculating longitude.

== Mathematics ==
- Lagrange's Recherches d'Arithmétique develops a general theory of binary quadratic forms.
- First Stanhope Demonstrator, a mechanical device to demonstrate and solve problems in logic, is produced by English aristocrat Charles Stanhope, 3rd Earl Stanhope.

== Medicine ==
- English surgeon Percivall Pott finds the first occupational link to cancer, contributing to the science of epidemiology.
- German physician Melchior Adam Weikard anonymously publishes the textbook Der Philosophische Arzt including the earliest description of symptoms resembling attention deficit hyperactivity disorder.

== Natural history ==
- February 21 – La Specola, Florence's Museum of Zoology and Natural History, opens to the public.
- Johan Christian Fabricius publishes his Systema entomologiæ.
- Peter Forsskål's Descriptiones Animalium: Avium, amphiborum, insectorum, vermium quæ in itinere orientali (containing early observations on bird migration) and Flora Ægyptiaco-Arabica sive descriptiones plantarum quas per Ægyptum Inferiorem et Arabiam felicem detexit are published posthumously, edited by Carsten Niebuhr.

== Technology ==
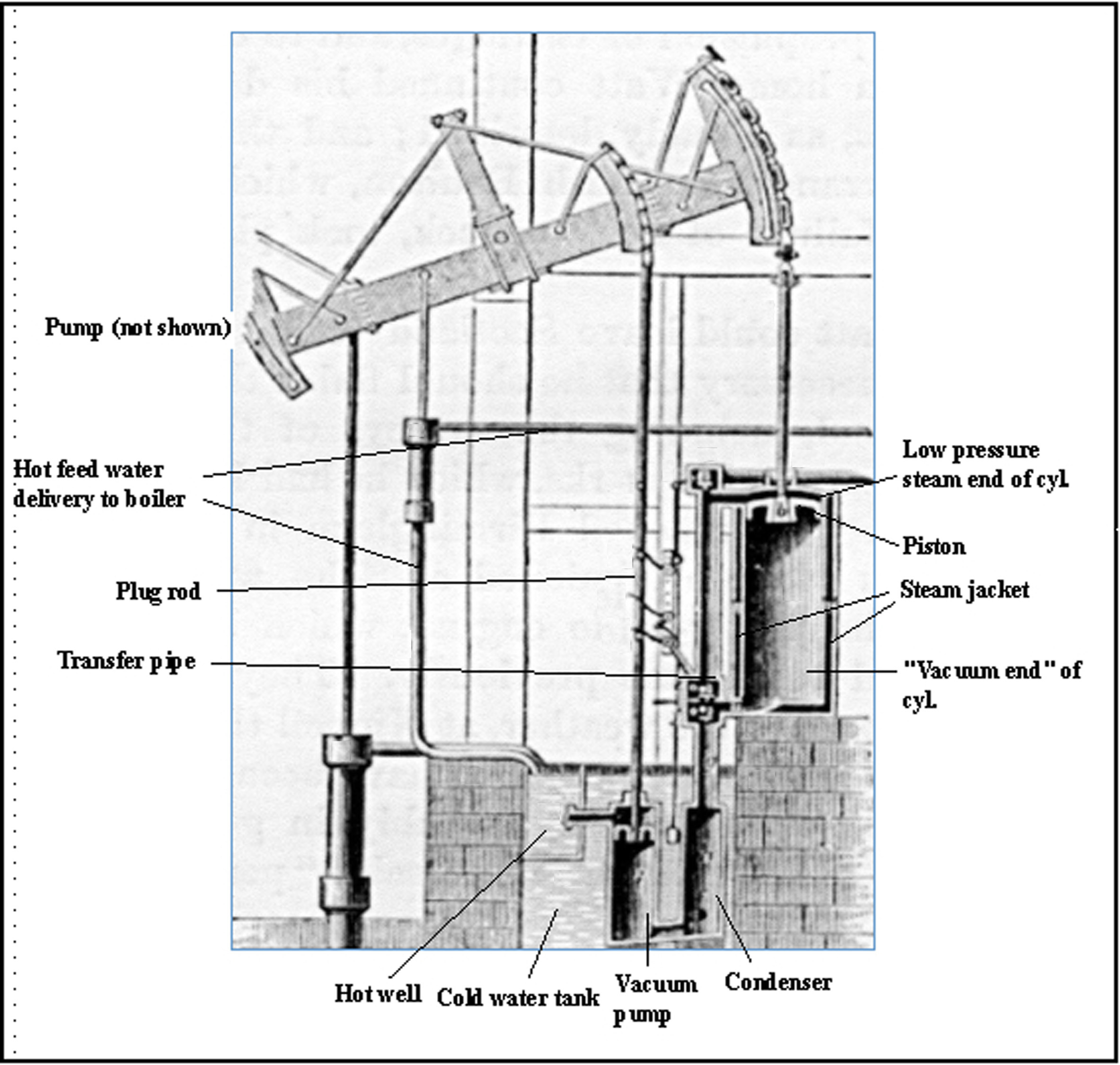
Watt steam engine

- May 22 – James Watt's 1769 steam engine patent is extended to June 1800 by Act of Parliament of Great Britain and the first engines are built under it.
- Jacques-Constantin Périer operates a paddle steamer on the Seine, but it proves to be underpowered.
- Alexander Cumming patents the S-trap in London, laying the foundations for the modern flush toilet.
- Edinburgh confectioner Charles Spalding devises improvements to the diving bell, adding a system of balance-weights.
- Pierre-Simon Girard, age 10, invents a water turbine.
- December 30 – John Arnold takes out his first patent for improvements in the construction of marine chronometers in Britain, including the first for a compensation balance.
- Approximate date – Thomas Mudge invents the detached lever escapement for clocks and watches.
- French Academy of Sciences made the statement that the academy "will no longer accept or deal with proposals concerning perpetual motion."

== Awards ==
- Copley Medal: Nevil Maskelyne

== Births ==
- January 22 – André-Marie Ampère, French physicist (died 1836)
- February 9 – Farkas Bolyai, Hungarian mathematician (died 1856)
- May 10 – William Phillips, English geologist (died 1828)
- July 23 – Étienne-Louis Malus, French physicist and mathematician] (died 1812)
- September 30 – Robert Adrain, Irish-born mathematician (died 1843)
- November 19 – Johann Karl Wilhelm Illiger, German entomologist and zoologist (died 1813)
- December 21 – Julien-Joseph Virey, French anthropologist, naturalist and physician (died 1846)

== Deaths ==
- March 3 – Richard Dunthorne, English astronomer (born 1711)
- May 1 – Israel Lyons, English mathematician and botanist (born 1739; died of measles)
- October 25 – Johan Maurits Mohr, Dutch astronomer (born 1716)
