= Signs and symptoms of Parkinson's disease =

Signs and symptoms

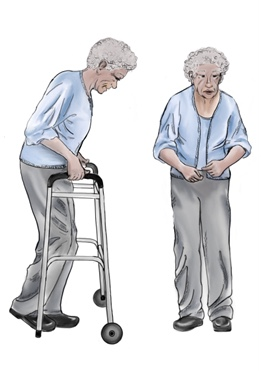
Parkinson's disease patient showing a typical flexed walking posture in advanced stage

Signs and symptoms of Parkinson's disease are varied. Parkinson's disease affects movement, producing motor symptoms. Non-motor symptoms, which include dysautonomia, cognitive and neurobehavioral problems, and sensory and sleep difficulties, are also common. When other diseases mimic Parkinson's disease, they are categorized as parkinsonism.

== Motor ==
Four motor symptoms are considered cardinal signs in PD: slowness of movement (bradykinesia), tremor, rigidity, and postural instability. Typical for PD is an initial asymmetric distribution of these symptoms, where in the course of the disease, a gradual progression to bilateral symptoms develops, although some asymmetry usually persists. Other motor symptoms include gait and posture disturbances such as decreased arm swing, a forward-flexed posture, and the use of small steps when walking; speech and swallowing disturbances; and other symptoms such as a mask-like facial expression or small handwriting are examples of the range of common motor problems that can appear.

=== Cardinal signs ===
Four motor signs are considered cardinal in PD: tremor, rigidity, bradykinesia, and postural instability (also referred to as parkinsonism).

- Tremor is the most apparent and well-known sign. It is also the most common; though around 30% of individuals with PD do not have tremor at disease onset, most develop it as the disease progresses. It is usually a rest tremor, maximal when the limb is at rest and disappearing with voluntary movement and sleep. It affects to a greater extent the most distal part of the limb, and at onset typically appears in only a single arm or leg, becoming bilateral later during the course of the disease. Frequency of PD tremor is between 4 and 6 hertz (cycles per second). It is a pronation–supination tremor that is described as "pill-rolling"; that is, the index finger of the hand tends to get into contact with the thumb, and they perform a circular movement together. Such term was given due to the similarity of the movement in PD patients with the former pharmaceutical technique of manually making pills. PD tremor is not improved with alcohol intake, as opposed to essential tremor.
- Rigidity is characterized by an increased muscle tone (an excessive and continuous contraction of the muscles) which produces stiffness and resistance to movement in joints. Rigidity may be associated with joint pain, with such pain being a frequent initial manifestation of the disease. When limbs of the person with PD are passively moved by others, a "cogwheel rigidity" is commonly seen. Cogwheel-like or ratchety jerks are characterized by the articulation moving as opposed to the normal fluid movement; when a muscle is externally tried to move, it resists at first, but with enough force, it is partially moved until it resists again, and only with further force, will it be moved. The combination of tremor and increased tone is considered to be at the origin of cogwheel rigidity.
- Bradykinesia and akinesia: the former is slowness of movement, while the latter is the absence of it. It is the most characteristic clinical feature of PD, and is associated with difficulties along the whole course of the movement process, from planning to initiation and finally execution of a movement. The performance of sequential and simultaneous movements is also hindered. Bradykinesia is the most disabling symptom in the early stages of the disease. Initial manifestations of bradykinesia are problems when performing daily life tasks requiring fine motor control such as writing, sewing, or getting dressed. Clinical evaluation is based in similar tasks consisting such as alternating movements between both hands or feet. Bradykinesia is not equal for all movements or times. It is modified by the activity or emotional state of the subject to the point of some patients who are barely able to walk being capable of riding a bicycle. Generally, patients have less difficulties when some sort of external cue is provided.

... immobile patients who become excited may be able to make quick movements such as catching a ball (or may be able to suddenly run if someone screams "fire"). This phenomenon (kinesia paradoxica) suggests that patients with PD have intact motor programmes, but have difficulties accessing them without an external trigger, such as a loud noise, marching music, or a visual cue requiring them to step over an obstacle.

- Postural instability: In the late stages, postural instability is typical, which leads to impaired balance and frequent falls, and secondarily to bone fractures. Instability is often absent in the initial stages, especially in younger people. Up to 40% of the patients may experience falls and around 10% may have falls weekly, with the number of falls being related to the severity of PD. It is produced by a failure of postural reflexes, along other disease-related factors such as orthostatic hypotension or cognitive and sensory changes.

=== Other motor symptoms ===
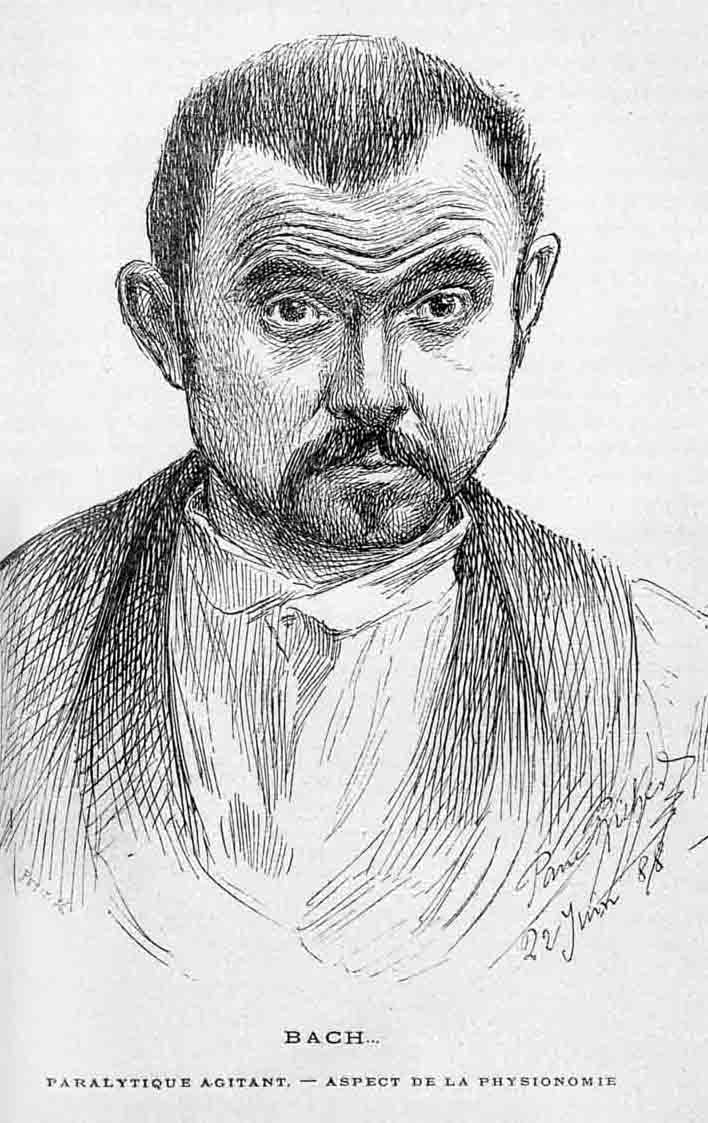
Drawing of a Parkinson's disease patient face showing hypomimia. Depiction appeared in Nouvelle Iconographie de la Salpètrière, vol 1 (1888).

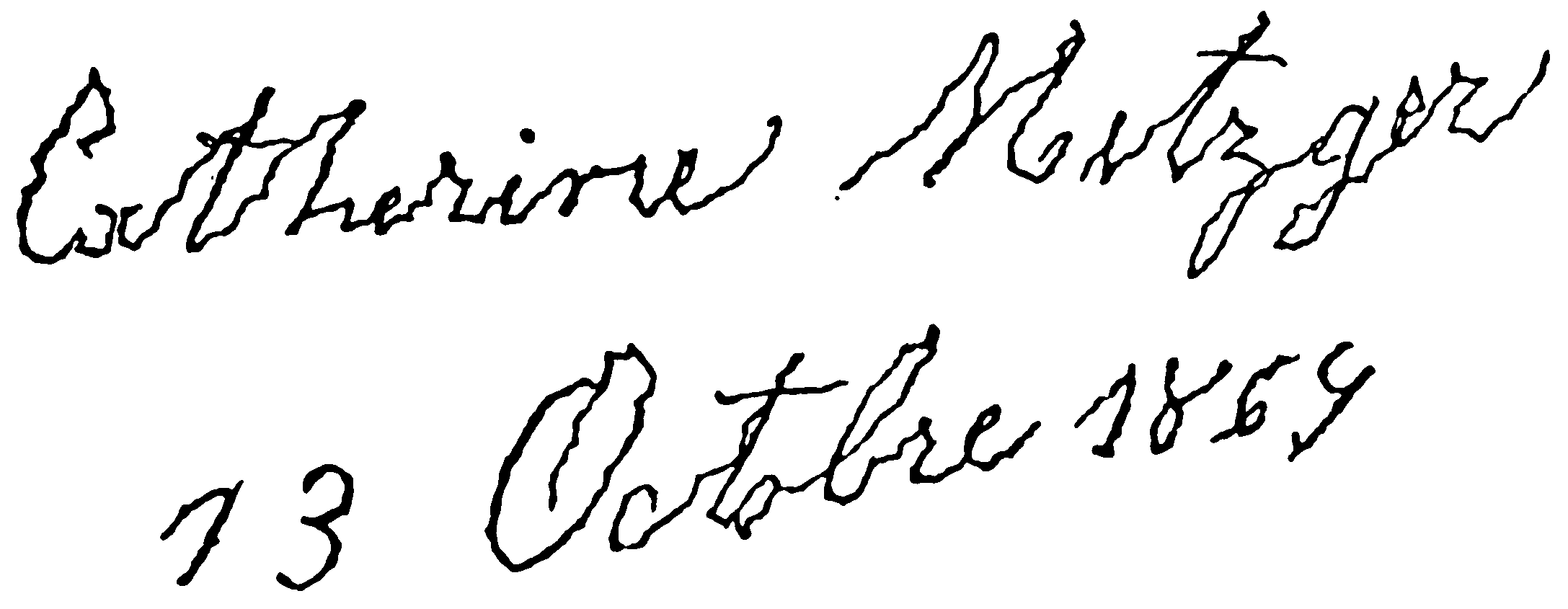
Example of writing by a patient with Parkinson's disease, possibly showing micrographia in addition to other abnormal characteristics. published by Jean-Martin Charcot in 1879: Text accompanying image stated, "The strokes forming the letters are very irregular and sinuous, whilst the irregularities and sinuosities are of a very limited width. On a careful examination of this specimen of writing, it will be perceived that the down-strokes are all, with the exception of the first letter, made with comparative firmness and are, in fact, nearly normal—the finer up-strokes, on the contrary, are all tremulous in appearance, and it is to the unsteadiness of these lines that the peculiar character of the writing here is principally due."

Other motor symptoms include:

- Gait and posture disturbances:
  - Shuffling gait is characterized by short steps, with feet barely leaving the ground. Small obstacles tend to cause the patient to trip.
  - Decreased arm-swing
  - Turning 'en bloc, rather than the usual twisting of the neck and trunk and pivoting on the toes, is when PD patients keep their necks and trunks rigid, requiring multiple small steps to accomplish a turn.
  - Camptocormia is a stooped, forward-flexed posture. In severe forms, the head and upper shoulders may be bent at a right angle relative to the trunk.
  - Festination is a combination of stooped posture, imbalance, and short steps. It leads to a gait that gets progressively faster and faster, often ending in a fall.
  - Gait freezing, also called motor blocks, is a manifestation of akinesia. Gait freezing is characterized by a sudden inability to move the lower extremities which usually lasts less than 10 seconds. It may worsen in tight, cluttered spaces, when attempting to initiate gait or turning around, or when approaching a destination. Freezing improves with treatment and also with behavioral techniques such as marching to command or following a given rhythm.
  - Dystonia is abnormal, sustained, sometimes painful twisting muscle contractions, often affecting the foot and ankle (mainly toe flexion and foot inversion), which often interferes with gait.
  - Scoliosis is abnormal curvature of the spine.
- Speech and swallowing disturbances:
  - Hypophonia (soft speech).
  - Monotonic speech—quality tends to be soft, hoarse, and monotonous.
  - Festinating speech—excessively rapid, soft, poorly intelligible speech.
  - Drooling is most likely caused by a weak, infrequent swallow.
  - Dysphagia is an impaired ability to swallow, which in the case of PD is probably related to an inability to initiate the swallowing reflex or by a too long laryngeal or oesophageal movement. It can lead to aspiration pneumonia.
  - Dysarthria is a form of speech disorder.
- Other motor symptoms and signs:
  - Fatigue
  - Hypomimia (a mask-like face).
  - Difficulty rolling in bed or rising from a seated position.
  - Micrographia (small, cramped handwriting).
  - Impaired fine-motor dexterity and motor coordination
  - Impaired gross-motor coordination.
  - Akathisia (an unpleasant desire to move, often related to medication).
  - Reemergence of primitive reflexes.
  - Glabellar reflex

== Neuropsychiatric ==
Example of reported prevalences of mood problems in PD patients with dementia
Mood problem	Prevalence
Depression	58%
Apathy	54%
Anxiety	49%

Parkinson's disease causes neuropsychiatric disturbances, which mainly include cognitive disorders, mood disorders, and behavior problems, and can be as disabling as motor symptoms.

Since L-Dopa, the widely used drug in Parkinson's disease treatment, is decarboxylated by aromatic L-amino acid decarboxylase (AADC), which is found in both dopaminergic and serotonergic neurons, it is possible for serotonergic neurons to convert L-Dopa into dopamine and generate excessive neuronal death by creating reactive oxygen species and quinoproteins. The association of serotonin with mood and cognition may explain some of the side-effects observed in patients treated with L-Dopa due to serotonin deficit.

In most cases, motor symptoms predominate at early PD stages, while cognitive disturbances (such as mild cognitive impairment or dementia) emerge later. The onset of parkinsonism in PD relative to dementia is used as an arbitrary criterion to clinically distinguish Parkinson's disease dementia (PDD) and dementia with Lewy bodies (DLB) using a 'one-year rule'. Dementia onset within 12-months of or at the same time as motor dysfunctions qualified as DLB, whereas in PDD, parkinsonism had to precede dementia by at least one year.

Cognitive disturbances occur even in the initial stages of the disease in some cases. A very high proportion of patients have mild cognitive impairment as the disease advances. Most common deficits in nondemented patients are:

- Executive dysfunction, which translates into impaired set shifting, poor problem solving, and fluctuations in attention among other difficulties
- Slowed cognitive speed (bradyphrenia)
- Memory problems can occur, specifically in recalling learned information, with an important improvement with cues. Recognition memory is less impaired than free recall, pointing towards a retrieving more than to an encoding problem.
- Regarding language, patients are found to have problems in verbal fluency tests.
- Visuospatial skills difficulties, which are seen when the person with PD is for example asked to perform tests of face perception and perception of line orientation.

Deficits tend to aggravate with time, developing in many cases into dementia. A person with PD has a six-fold increased risk of developing it, and the overall rate in people with the disease is around 30%. Moreover, prevalence of dementia increases in relation to disease duration, going up to 80%. Dementia has been associated with a reduced quality of life in patients and caregivers, increased mortality, and a higher probability of moving to a nursing home.

Cognitive problems and dementia are usually accompanied by behavior and mood alterations, although these kinds of changes are also more common in those patients without cognitive impairment than in the general population. Most frequent mood difficulties include:

- Depression is well recognized in PD, having been identified as "melancholia" by James Parkinson in his original report of the disease in 1817. Estimated prevalence rates of depression vary widely according to the population sampled and methodology used, although depressive symptoms, irrespective of classically defined DSM criteria for depression, are present in 35% of patients There is an increased risk for any individual with depression to go on to develop Parkinson's disease at a later date. It is increasingly thought to be a consequence of the disease rather than an emotional reaction to disability, although ample evidence shows that the relationship between depression and PD is bidirectional. General risk factors for depression are actually stronger markers for depression in PD patients than PD specific factors. Since Parkinson's affects many areas of the brain that control mood (specifically the frontal lobe as well as those areas that produce serotonin, norepinephrine and dopamine), depression may result. Depression is one of the most common neuropsychiatric conditions found in patients who have PD, and it is associated with more rapid progression of physical symptoms and a greater decline in cognitive skills. Depression in patients with PD was found to be more predictive of overall disability than was the motor disability from the PD. An interesting finding is that although a high rate of depression is seen in patients with PD, the incidence of suicide is lower in this group of patients. Many of the symptoms of PD may overlap with those of depression, making diagnosis a difficult issue.
- Apathy
- Anxiety is seen; 70% of individuals with PD diagnosed with pre-existing depression go on to develop anxiety. About 90% of PD patients with pre-existing anxiety subsequently develop depression, apathy, or abulia.

Obsessive–compulsive behaviors (also known as impulse-control disorders) such as craving, binge eating, hypersexuality, pathological gambling, punding, or others, can also appear in PD, and have been related to a dopamine dysregulation syndrome associated with the medications for the disease.

Psychotic symptoms are common in PD, generally associated with dopamine therapy. Symptoms of psychosis, or impaired reality testing, are either hallucinations, typically visual, less commonly auditory, and rarely in other domains including tactile, gustatory, or olfactory, or delusions, that is, irrational beliefs. Hallucinations are generally stereotyped and without emotional content. Initially, patients usually have insight so that the hallucinations are benign in terms of their immediate impact, but have poor prognostic implications, with increased risk of dementia, worsened psychotic symptoms, and mortality. Delusions occur in about 5-10% of treated patients, and are considerably more disruptive, being paranoid in nature, of spousal infidelity or family abandonment. Psychosis is an independent risk factor for nursing-home placement.

Hallucinations can occur in parkinsonian syndromes for a variety of reasons. An overlap exists between PD and dementia with Lewy bodies, so that where Lewy bodies are present in the visual cortex, hallucinations may result. Hallucinations can also be brought about by excessive dopaminergic stimulation. Most hallucinations are visual in nature, often formed as familiar people or animals, and are generally not threatening in nature. Some patients find them comforting; however, their caregivers often find this part of the disease most disturbing, and the occurrence of hallucinations is a major risk factor for hospitalisation. Treatment options consist of modifying the dosage of dopaminergic drugs taken each day, adding an antipsychotic drug such as quetiapine, or offering caregivers a psychosocial intervention to help them cope with the hallucinations.

== Sleep ==
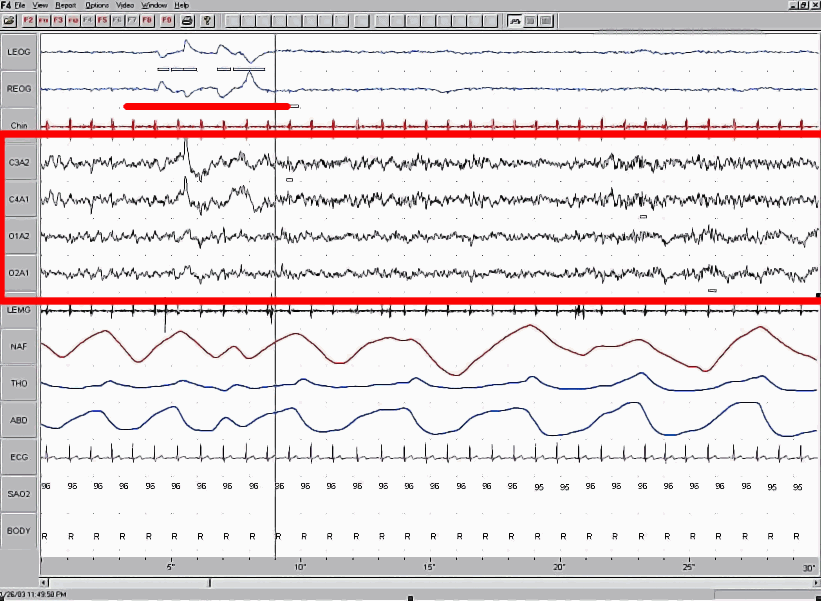
Rapid eye movement sleep is altered in PD as opposed to the shown EEG polysomnographic record representing normal REM.

Sleep problems can be worsened by medications for PD, but they are a core feature of the disease. Sleep dysfunction in PD has significant negative impacts on both patient and carer quality of life. Some common symptoms are:

- Excessive daytime somnolence
- Insomnia, characterized mostly by sleep fragmentation
- Disturbances in rapid eye movement sleep: disturbingly vivid dreams, and rapid eye movement behavior disorder, characterized by acting out of dream content: It appears in a third of the patients and it is a risk factor for PD in the overall population.

== Perception ==
- Impaired proprioception (the awareness of bodily position in three-dimensional space)
- Reduction or loss of sense of smell (hyposmia or anosmia) may be an early marker of the disease.
- Paresthesias

== Autonomic ==
- Orthostatic hypotension leading to dizziness and fainting
- Oily skin
- Urinary incontinence (typically in later disease progression) and nocturia (getting up in the night to pass urine)
- Altered sexual function is characterized by profound impairment of sexual arousal, behavior, orgasm, and drive, and is found in mid- and late PD.
- Excessive sweating

== Gastrointestinal ==
Parkinson's Disease causes constipation and gastric dysmotility that is severe enough to endanger comfort and even health. A factor in this is the appearance of Lewy bodies and Lewy neurites even before these affect the functioning of the substantia nigra in the neurons in the enteric nervous system that control gut functions.

== Neuro-ophthalmological ==
PD is related to different ophthalmological abnormalities produced by the neurological changes. Among them are:

- Decreased blink rate
- Irritation of the eye surface
- Alteration in the tear film
- Visual hallucinations
- Decreased eye convergence
- Blepharospasm
- Abnormalities in ocular pursuit, ocular fixation and saccadic movements
- Difficulties opening the eyelids This can have particular relevance when driving. People with Parkinson's have been shown to be less accurate in spotting landmarks and roadsigns whilst driving.
- Limitations in upward gaze
- Blurred vision
- Diplopia (double vision), produced by a reduced eye convergence.
