= Cognitive disengagement syndrome =

Type of attention disorder

- Other names: Concentration deficit disorder (CDD), sluggish cognitive tempo (SCT) (outdated)
- Specialty: Psychiatry
- Symptoms: Inattention; daydreaming; mental fog; mind-wandering; slow information processing; frequent confusion; slow reaction time
- Duration: Lifelong
- Causes: Genetics and, to a lesser extent, environmental factors
- Differential diagnosis: ADHD
- Management: Medication, accommodations
- Medication: Atomoxetine Lisdexamfetamine
- Frequency: 5.1% (hypothesized)

Cognitive disengagement syndrome (CDS) is a syndrome characterized by developmentally inappropriate, impairing, and persistent levels of decoupled attentional processing from the ongoing external context and resultant hypoactivity. Symptoms often manifest in difficulties with staring, mind blanking, absent-mindedness, mental confusion, and maladaptive mind-wandering alongside delayed, sedentary, or slow motor movements. To scientists in the field, it has reached the threshold of evidence and recognition as a distinct syndrome.

Since 1798, the medical literature on attentional disorders has distinguished between at least two kinds: one a disorder of distractibility, lack of sustained attention, and poor inhibition (that is now known as ADHD), and the other a disorder of low power, arousal, or oriented/selective attention (now known as CDS).

Although inattention is implicated in both conditions, CDS is distinct from ADHD. Unlike ADHD, which is the result of deficient executive functioning and self-regulation, CDS presents with problems in arousal, maladaptive daydreaming, and oriented or selective attention (distinguishing what is important from unimportant in information that has to be processed rapidly), as opposed to poor persistence or sustained attention, inhibition, and executive functioning more generally. In educational settings, CDS tends to result in decreased work accuracy, while ADHD impairs productivity.

CDS can also occur as a comorbidity with ADHD in some people, leading to substantially higher impairment than when either condition occurs alone.

In contemporary science today, it is clear that this set of symptoms is important because it is associated with unique impairments, above and beyond ADHD. CDS independently has a negative impact on functioning (such as a diminished quality of life, increased stress, and suicidal behavior, as well as lower educational attainment and socioeconomic status). CDS is clinically relevant as multiple randomized controlled clinical trials (RCTs) have shown that it responds poorly to methylphenidate.

Originally, CDS was thought to represent about one in three persons with the inattentive presentation of ADHD, as a psychiatric misdiagnosis, and to be incompatible with hyperactivity. Subsequent research established that it can be comorbid with ADHD—and present in individuals without ADHD as well. Therefore, and due to many other lines of evidence, there is a scientific consensus that the condition is a distinct syndrome.

If CDS and ADHD coexist together, the problems are additive: those with both conditions had higher levels of impairment and inattention than adults with ADHD only and were more likely to be unmarried, out of work, or claiming disability benefits. CDS alone is also present in the population and can be significantly impairing in educational and occupational settings, even if it is not as pervasively impairing as ADHD. The studies on medical treatments are limited. However, research suggests that atomoxetine and lisdexamfetamine effectively reduce its symptoms and thus may be used to treat CDS.

The condition was previously called sluggish cognitive tempo (SCT). The terms concentration deficit disorder (CDD) or cognitive disengagement syndrome (CDS) have recently been preferred to SCT because they better and more accurately explain the condition and thus eliminate confusion.

== Signs and symptoms ==
CDS symptoms (Preliminary research criteria)

- Prone to daydreaming
- Easily confused or mentally foggy
- Spacey or inattentive to surroundings
- Mind seems to be elsewhere
- Stares blankly into space
- Underactive, slow moving or sluggish
- Lethargic or less energetic
- Trouble staying awake or alert
- Has drowsy or sleepy appearance
- Gets lost in own thoughts
- Apathetic or withdrawn, less engaged in activities
- Loses train of thought or cognitive set
- Processes information less quickly or accurately

=== Social behavior ===
In many ways, those who have a CDS profile have some of the opposite symptoms of those with predominantly hyperactive-impulsive or combined presentation of ADHD: instead of being hyperactive, extroverted, obtrusive, excessively energetic, and risk takers, those with CDS are drifting, absent-minded, listless, introspective, and daydreamy. They feel like they are "in the fog" and seem "out of it".

The comorbid psychiatric problems often associated with CDS are more often of the internalizing types, such as anxiety, unhappiness, or depression. Most consistent across studies was a pattern of reticence and social withdrawal in interactions with peers. Their typically shy nature and slow response time has often been misinterpreted as aloofness or disinterest by others. In social group interactions, those with CDS may be ignored and neglected. People with classic ADHD are more likely to be rejected in these situations because of their social intrusiveness or aggressive behavior. Compared to children with CDS, they are also much more likely to show antisocial behaviors like substance abuse, oppositional-defiant disorder, or conduct disorder (frequent lying, stealing, fighting etc.). Fittingly, in terms of personality, ADHD seems to be associated with sensitivity to reward and fun seeking while CDS may be associated with punishment sensitivity.

=== Attention deficits ===
Individuals with CDS symptoms may show a qualitatively different kind of attention deficit that is more typical of a true information processing problem; such as poor focusing of attention on details or the capacity to distinguish important from unimportant information rapidly. In contrast, people with ADHD have more difficulties with persistence of attention and action toward goals coupled with impaired resistance to responding to distractions. Unlike CDS, those with classic ADHD have problems with inhibition but have no difficulty selecting and filtering sensory input.

Some think that CDS and ADHD produce different kinds of inattention: While those with ADHD can engage their attention but fail to sustain it over time, people with CDS seem to have difficulty with engaging their attention to a specific task. Accordingly, the ability to orient attention has been found to be abnormal in CDS.

Both disorders interfere significantly with academic performance but may do so by different means. CDS may be more problematic with the accuracy of the work a child does in school and lead to making more errors. Conversely, ADHD may more adversely affect productivity that represents the amount of work done in a particular time interval. Children with CDS seem to have more difficulty with consistently remembering things that were previously learned and make more mistakes on memory retrieval tests than do children with ADHD. They have been found to perform much worse on psychological tests involving perceptual-motor speed or hand-eye coordination and speed. They also have a more disorganized thought process, a greater degree of sloppiness, and lose things more easily. The risk for additional learning disabilities seems equal in both ADHD and CDS (23–50%), but math disorders may be more frequent in the CDS group.

A key behavioral characteristic of those with CDS symptoms is that they are more likely to appear to be lacking motivation and may even have an unusually higher frequency of daytime sleepiness. They seem to lack energy to deal with mundane tasks and will consequently seek to concentrate on things that are mentally stimulating perhaps because of their underaroused state. Alternatively, CDS may involve a pathological form of excessive mind-wandering.

=== Executive function ===
The executive system of the human brain provides for the cross-temporal organization of behavior toward goals and the future and coordinates actions and strategies for everyday goal-directed tasks. Essentially, this system permits humans to self-regulate their behavior so as to sustain action and problem solving toward goals specifically and the future more generally. Dysexecutive syndrome is defined as a "cluster of impairments generally associated with damage to the frontal lobes of the brain" which includes "difficulties with high-level tasks such as planning, organising, initiating, monitoring, and adapting behaviour". Such executive deficits pose serious problems for a person's ability to engage in self-regulation over time to attain their goals and anticipate and prepare for the future.

Adele Diamond postulated that the core cognitive deficit of those with ADHD-I is working memory, or, as she coined in a paper on the subject, "childhood-onset dysexecutive syndrome". However, two more recent studies by Barkley found that while children and adults with CDS had some deficits in executive functions (EF) in everyday life activities, they were primarily of far less magnitude and largely centered around problems with self-organization and problem-solving. Even then, analyses showed that most of the difficulties with executive function deficits were the result of overlapping ADHD symptoms that may co-exist with CDS rather than being attributable to CDS itself. More research on the link of CDS to executive function deficits is clearly indicated, but—as of this time—CDS does not seem to be as strongly associated with executive function deficits as is ADHD.

== Causes ==
Unlike ADHD, the general causes of CDS symptoms are almost unknown, though one recent study of twins suggested that the condition appears to be nearly as heritable or genetically influenced in nature as ADHD.

Little is known about the neurobiology of CDS. However, symptoms of CDS seem to indicate that the posterior attention networks may be more involved here than the prefrontal cortex region of the brain and difficulties with working memory so prominent in ADHD. This hypothesis gained greater support following a 2015 neuroimaging study comparing ADHD inattentive symptoms and CDS symptoms in adolescents: It found that CDS was associated with a decreased activity in the left superior parietal lobule (SPL), whereas inattentive symptoms were associated with other differences in activation. A 2018 study showed an association between CDS and specific parts of the frontal lobes, differing from classical ADHD neuro-anatomy.

A study showed a small link between thyroid functioning and CDS symptoms suggesting that thyroid dysfunction is not the cause of CDS. High rates of CDS were observed in children who had prenatal alcohol exposure and in survivors of acute lymphoblastic leukemia, where they were associated with cognitive late effects.

== Diagnosis ==
CDS is included, with its previous name of sluggish cognitive tempo, as a diagnostic descriptor in the current International Classification of Diseases (ICD) released in 2022 under the World Health Organization (WHO). However, it is not included as a separate disorder in the ICD or current Diagnostic and Statistical Manual of Mental Disorders (DSM) (2013) although it may be in subsequent editions; to scientists in the field, it has reached the threshold of evidence and recognition as a distinct syndrome and is diagnosed by some professional practices. Screening tools have been created to assess CDS symptoms. Although some symptoms of other conditions are partially shared with CDS, they are distinct conditions.

== Treatment ==
Treatment of CDS has not been well investigated. With a lack of studies focusing specifically on CDS, researchers initially looked to treatment studies involving participants diagnosed with ADD without hyperactivity (DSM-III, 1980 criteria) or ADHD - predominantly inattentive (from DSM-IV, 1994 onwards). Studies in the 1990s and 2000s found that a sizable percentage of children with ADD without hyperactivity did not gain much benefit from methylphenidate, and when they did benefit, it was at a much lower dose compared to those with hyperactivity, who typically responded well at medium-to-high doses. However, one study and a retrospective analysis of medical histories found that the presence or absence of CDS symptoms made no difference in response to methylphenidate in children with ADHD-I. These studies did not specifically and explicitly examine the effect of the drug on CDS symptoms in children.

In April 2014, The New York Times reported that sluggish cognitive tempo was the subject of pharmaceutical company clinical drug trials, including by Eli Lilly that proposed treatment with Atomoxetine, one of its biggest-selling drugs which it sells under the name Strattera. Atomoxetine may be used to treat CDS, as multiple randomised controlled clinical trials (RCTs) have found that it is an effective treatment. In contrast, multiple other RCTs have shown that it responds poorly to methylphenidate.

Only one study has investigated the use of behavior modification methods at home and school for children with predominantly CDS symptoms and it found good success. Other researchers believe that there is no effective treatment for CDS.

== Prognosis ==
The prognosis of CDS is unknown. In contrast, much is known about the adolescent and adult outcomes of children having ADHD. Those with CDS symptoms typically show a later onset of their symptoms than do those with ADHD, perhaps by as much as a year or two later on average. Both groups had similar levels of learning problems and inattention, but CDS children had less externalizing symptoms and higher levels of unhappiness, anxiety/depression, withdrawn behavior, and social dysfunction. They do not have the same risks for oppositional defiant disorder, conduct disorder, or social aggression and thus may have different life course outcomes compared to children with ADHD-HI and Combined subtypes who have far higher risks for these other "externalizing" disorders.

However, unlike ADHD, there are no longitudinal studies of children with CDS that can shed light on the developmental course and adolescent or adult outcomes of these individuals.

== Epidemiology ==
Recent studies indicate that the symptoms of CDS in children form two dimensions: daydreamy-spacey and sluggish-lethargic, and that the former are more distinctive of the disorder from ADHD than the latter. This same pattern was recently found in the first study of adults with CDS by Barkley and also in more recent studies of college students. These studies indicated that CDS is probably not a subtype of ADHD but a distinct disorder from it. Yet it is one that overlaps with ADHD in 30–50% of cases of each disorder, suggesting a pattern of comorbidity between two related disorders rather than subtypes of the same disorder. Nevertheless, CDS is strongly correlated with ADHD inattentive and combined subtypes. According to a Norwegian study, "[CDS] correlated significantly with inattentiveness, regardless of the subtype of ADHD."

== History ==
=== Early observations ===
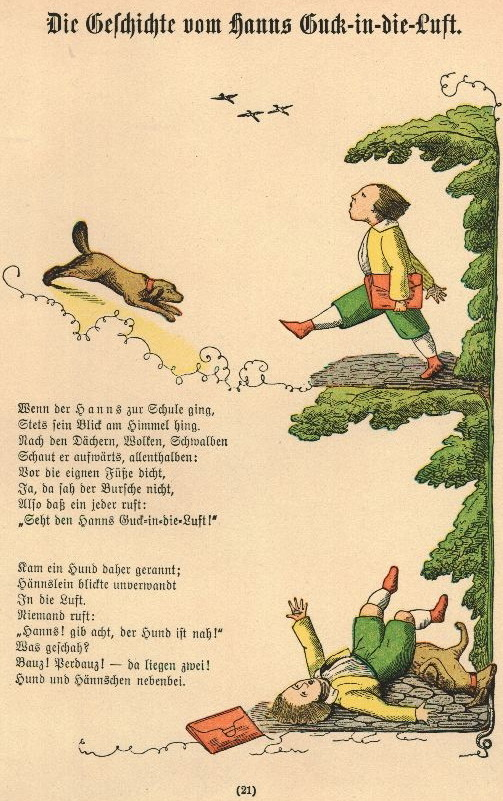
Johnny Head-in-Air is an absent-minded boy who seems unaware of his surroundings.

There have been descriptions in literature for centuries of children who are very inattentive and prone to foggy thought.

Symptoms similar to ADHD were first systematically described in 1775 by Melchior Adam Weikard and in 1798 by Alexander Crichton in their medical textbooks. Although Weikard mainly described a single disorder of attention resembling the combined presentation of ADHD, Crichton postulates an additional attention disorder, described as a "morbid diminution of its power or energy", and further explores possible "corporeal" and "mental" causes for the disorder (including "irregularities in diet, excessive evacuations, and the abuse of corporeal desires"). However, he does not further describe any symptoms of the disorder, making this an early but certainly non-specific reference to a CDS-like syndrome.

One example from fictional literature is Heinrich Hoffmann's character of "Johnny Head-in-Air" (Hanns Guck-in-die-Luft), in Struwwelpeter (1845). (Some researchers see several characters in this book as showing signs of child psychiatric disorders).

The Canadian pediatrician Guy Falardeau, besides working with hyperactive children, also wrote about very dreamy, quiet and well-behaved children that he encountered in his practice.

=== First research efforts ===
In more modern times, research surrounding attention disorders has traditionally focused on hyperactive symptoms, but began to newly address inattentive symptoms in the 1970s. Influenced by this research, the DSM-III (1980) allowed for the first time a diagnosis of an ADD subtype that presented without hyperactivity. Researchers exploring this subtype created rating scales for children which included questions regarding symptoms such as short attention span, distractibility, drowsiness, and passivity. In the mid-1980s, it was proposed that as opposed to the then accepted dichotomy of ADD with or without hyperactivity (ADD/H, ADD/noH), instead a three-factor model of ADD was more appropriate, consisting of hyperactivity-impulsivity, inattention-disorganization, and slow tempo subtypes.

In the 1990s, Weinberg and Brumback proposed a new disorder: "primary disorder of vigilance" (PVD). Characteristic symptoms of it were difficulty sustaining alertness and arousal, daydreaming, difficulty focusing attention, losing one's place in activities and conversation, slow completion of tasks and a kind personality. The most detailed case report in their article looks like a prototypical representation of CDS. The authors acknowledged an overlap of PVD and ADHD but argued in favor of considering PVD to be distinct in its unique cognitive impairments. Problematic with the paper is that it dismissed ADHD as a nonexistent disorder (despite it having several thousand research studies by then) and preferred the term PVD for this CDS-like symptom complex. A further difficulty with the PVD diagnosis is that not only is it based merely on 6 cases instead of the far larger samples of CDS children used in other studies but the very term implies that science has established the underlying cognitive deficits giving rise to CDS symptoms, and this is hardly the case.

With the publication of DSM-IV in 1994, the disorder was labeled as ADHD, and was divided into three subtypes: predominantly inattentive, predominantly hyperactive-impulsive, and combined. Of the proposed CDS-specific symptoms discussed while developing the DSM-IV, only "forgetfulness" was included in the symptom list for ADHD-I, and no others were mentioned. However, several of the proposed CDS symptoms were included in the diagnosis of "ADHD, not otherwise specified".

Prior to 2001, there were a total of four scientific journal articles specifically addressing symptoms of CDS. But then a researcher suggested that sluggish tempo symptoms (such as inconsistent alertness and orientation) were, in fact, adequate for the diagnosis of ADHD-I. Thus, he argued, their exclusion from DSM-IV was inappropriate. The research article and its accompanying commentary urging the undertaking of more research on CDS spurred the publication of over 30 scientific journal articles to date which specifically address symptoms of CDS.

However, with the publication of DSM-5 in 2013, ADHD continues to be classified as predominantly inattentive, predominantly hyperactive-impulsive, and combined type and there continues to be no mention of CDS as a diagnosis or a diagnosis subtype anywhere in the manual. The diagnosis of "ADHD, not otherwise specified" also no longer includes any mention of CDS symptoms. Similarly, ICD-10 has no diagnosis code for CDS. Although CDS is not recognized as a disorder at this point, researchers continue to debate its usefulness as a construct and its implications for further attention disorder research.

== Controversy ==
Significant skepticism has been raised within the medical and scientific communities as to whether CDS, currently considered a "symptom cluster," actually exists as a distinct disorder.

Allen Frances, emeritus professor of psychiatry at Duke University, argues: "We're seeing a fad in evolution: Just as ADHD has been the diagnosis du jour for 15 years or so, this is the beginning of another. This is a public health experiment on millions of kids...I have no doubt there are kids who meet the criteria for this thing, but nothing is more irrelevant. The enthusiasts here are thinking of missed patients. What about the mislabeled kids who are called patients when there's nothing wrong with them? They are not considering what is happening in the real world."

UCLA researcher and Journal of Abnormal Child Psychology editorial board member Steve S. Lee expresses concern that based on CDS's close relationship to ADHD, a pattern of overdiagnosis of the latter has "already grown to encompass too many children with common youthful behavior, or whose problems are derived not from a neurological disorder but from inadequate sleep, a different learning disability or other sources." Lee states: "The scientist part of me says we need to pursue knowledge, but we know that people will start saying their kids have [cognitive disengagement syndrome], and doctors will start diagnosing it and prescribing for it long before we know whether it's real...ADHD has become a public health, societal question, and it's a fair question to ask of [CDS]."

Adding to the controversy are potential conflicts of interest among the condition's proponents, including the funding of prominent CDS researchers' work by the global pharmaceutical company Eli Lilly. When referring to the "increasing clinical referrals occurring now and more rapidly in the near future driven by increased awareness of the general public in [CDS]", Dr. Barkley writes: "The fact that [CDS] is not recognized as yet in any official taxonomy of psychiatric disorders will not alter this circumstance given the growing presence of information on [CDS] at various widely visited internet sites such as YouTube and Wikipedia, among others."

== See also ==
- Attention deficit hyperactivity disorder controversies
- Bradyphrenia (slowness of thought)
- Clouding of consciousness
- Cognitive tempo
- Sluggish schizophrenia
- Type B personality
