= History of attention deficit hyperactivity disorder =

Attention deficit hyperactivity disorder (ADHD) is one of the most common yet controversial developmental disorders: 9% of those aged five to 18 are diagnosed each year; from the 1950s, when paediatric hyperactivity first was diagnosed, the causes, treatments, and implications have been debated widely.

Over time, different terms have been used to describe the symptoms of attention-deficit/hyperactivity disorder, or ADHD. The second edition of the Diagnostic and Statistical Manual of Mental Disorders, published in 1968, lists the condition as "Hyperkinetic Reaction of Childhood" (hyperkinetic disorder). In 1980, the DSM-III included "ADD (attention-deficit disorder) with or without hyperactivity". In 1987 this label was refined to "ADHD (attention-deficit hyperactivity disorder)" in the DSM-III-R, and further refined to “ADHD (attention-deficit/hyperactivity disorder)” in the 1994 DSM-IV.

== Historical cases ==
Many historical figures were much later speculated of having ADHD. Some, such as Matthew Smith, argue that even though it is possible to observe hyperactivity symptoms on those people, it is wrong to diagnose them with ADHD, as it is a modern construct and hyperactivity was not seen as a disorder. According to Smith, cases before 1957, when ADHD was first officially described, should not be counted as ADHD. Amongst those who has been theorized of possibly having ADHD were Thomas Edison, Oliver Cromwell, Lord Byron, Albert Einstein and Wolfgang Amadeus Mozart.

There are also possible ADHD descriptions in artistic works. One example of literature that could fit into an ADHD diagnosis is the works written by the physician Heinrich Hoffmann, such as the story Fidgety Phillip from the book Slovenly Peter, Straw Peter and the tale Johnny Look-in-the-Air . It is noteworthy that Hoffmann founded the first mental hospital in Frankfurt and became a successful psychiatrist. Examples of plays that possibly have ADHD references are Henry VIII from William Shakespeare and Faust, from Johann Wolfgang von Goethe, specifically a character named Euphorion. The painting “The Village School” from Jan Steen is also presented as possibly portraying children with ADHD, even though there is the hypothesis that the painter might just exaggerated normal child behavior.

== 18th century ==
A number of early writers described human behaviour patterns similar to today's definitions of ADHD. Some of them are Benjamin Rush, Charles West, Heinrich Neumann, Désiré-Magloire Bourneville, Thomas Clifford Allbutt, Thomas Smith Clouston, and Cornelius Kloekhof. Some have identified Dutch physician Cornelius Kloekhof as an early figure in the medical description of attention‑related symptoms. His 18th‑century clinical treatise provides what may be the earliest identifiable medical account of behaviors comparable to modern ADHD.

=== Melchior Adam Weikard ===
In 1775, Melchior Adam Weikard, a prominent German physician, published the textbook Der Philosophische Arzt. Weikard's text contained a description of ADHD-like behaviors, many of which are now fully considered symptoms associated with the inattentive dimension of ADHD in the Diagnostic and Statistical Manual of Mental Disorders. For instance, according to the English translation provided by Barkley and Peters, Weikard stated that:

An inattentive person won't remark anything but will be shallow everywhere. He studies his matters only superficially; his judgements are erroneous and he misconceives the worth of things because he does not spend enough time and patience to search a matter individually or by the piece with the adequate accuracy. Such people only hear half of everything; they memorize or inform only half of it or do it in a messy manner. According to a proverb they generally know a little bit of all and nothing of the whole…. They are mostly reckless, often copious considering imprudent projects, but they are also most inconstant in execution. They treat everything in a light manner since they are not attentive enough to feel denigration or disadvantages.

According to Weikard, the treatment recommended was:

The inattentive person is to be separated from the noise or any other objects; he is to be kept solitary, in the dark, when he is too active. The easily agile fibres are to be fixated by rubbing, cold baths, steel powder, cinchona, mineral waters, horseback riding, and gymnastic exercises.

=== Sir Alexander Crichton ===
Scottish-born physician and author, Sir Alexander Crichton described, in 1798, a mental state much like the inattentive subtype of ADHD, in his book An Inquiry into the Nature and Origin of Mental Derangement. Crichton had received some of his medical training in Germany and may well have known Weikard given that his training occurred in several of the towns where Weikard was known to have practiced medicine. More detailed in his observation than Weikard, Crichton described attention problems as:

The incapacity of attending with a necessary degree of constancy to any one object, almost always arises from an unnatural or morbid sensibility of the nerves, by which means this faculty is incessantly withdrawn from one impression to another. It may be either born with a person, or it may be the effect of accidental diseases.

When born with a person it becomes evident at a very early period of life, and has a very bad effect, inasmuch as it renders him incapable of attending with constancy to any one object of education. But it seldom is in so great a degree as totally to impede all instruction; and what is very fortunate, it is generally diminished with age.

Crichton further observed:

In this disease of attention, if it can with propriety be called so, every impression seems to agitate the person, and gives him or her an unnatural degree of mental restlessness. People walking up and down the room, a slight noise in the same, the moving of a table, the shutting a door suddenly, a slight excess of heat or of cold, too much light, or too little light, all destroy constant attention in such patients, inasmuch as it is easily excited by every impression.

Crichton noted that "…they have a particular name for the state of their nerves, which is expressive enough of their feelings. They say they have the fidgets." Dr. Crichton suggested that these children needed special educational intervention and noted that it was obvious that they had a problem attending even how hard they did try. "Every public teacher must have observed that there are many to whom the dryness and difficulties of the Latin and Greek grammars are so disgusting that neither the terrors of the rod, nor the indulgence of kind intreaty can cause them to give their attention to them."

Both Melchior Adam Weikard and Alexander Crichton wrote about the occupationally disabling features of this disorder, including attentional problems, restlessness, early onset, and how it can affect schooling, without any of the moralism introduced by George Still and later authors.

== 20th century ==
=== Sir George Frederic Still ===
In March 1902, Sir George Frederic Still (1868–1941), known as the father of British paediatrics, gave a series of lectures to the Royal College of Physicians in London under the name Goulstonian Lectures on ‘some abnormal psychical conditions in children’, which were published later the same year in The Lancet.

He described 43 children who had serious problems with sustained attention and self-regulation, who were often aggressive, defiant, resistant to discipline, excessively emotional or passionate, which showed little inhibitory volition, and could not learn from the consequences of their actions; though their intellect was normal. He wrote: "I would point out that a notable feature in many of these cases of moral defect without general impairment of intellect is a quite abnormal incapacity for sustained attention."

Dr. Still wrote: "there is a defect of moral consciousness which cannot be accounted for by any fault of environment". When Still was talking about moral control, he was referring to it as William James had done before him, but to Still, the moral control of behavior meant "the control of action in conformity with the idea of the good of all."

"Another boy, aged 6 years, with marked moral defect was unable to keep his attention even to a game for more than a very short time, and as might be expected, the failure of attention was very noticeable at school, with the result that in some cases the child was backward in school attainments, although in manner and ordinary conversation he appeared as bright and intelligent as any child could be."

He proposed a biological predisposition to this behavioral condition that was probably hereditary in some children and the result of pre- or postnatal injury in others. Still views greatly disagreed with his peers, and probably his opinions were not very influential at a time. The child guidance movement believed that such behaviors had environmental causes, such as psychosocial changes.

His work was rediscovered in the XX century by clinicians such as Schachar (1986). Many historians of ADHD have inferred that the children Still described in his series of three published lectures to the Royal College of Physicians would likely have qualified for the current disorder of ADHD combined type, among other disorders. The lectures were generally accepted as the first clinical description of ADHD and the starting point of ADHD history, even though older writings are known.

=== Encephalitis epidemic (1917–1918) ===
In 1916, A. F. Tredgold described psychiatric symptoms that he called "minimal brain damage" as primary and secondary, where the primary form was hereditary and secondary was acquired. The ideas of hereditary degeneration were greatly reinforced by the eugenics movement.

The secondary minimal brain damage popularized during epidemic of encephalitis lethargica from 1917 to 1918 and the pandemic of Spanish flu from 1919 to 1920, both allegedly spread by the troops movements during World War I. Approximately a third of children, specially boys between the ages of 5 and 18 years, who contracted encephalitis lethargica suffered from psychiatric symptoms, including change of personality, restlessness, irregular sleeping habits, motional instability manifesting as irritability, crying spells, and temper tantrums, including impulsivity, and unpredictability, what Constantin von Economo described as "moral insanity". More extreme cases include aggression and "shameless sexual activity". The encephalitis lethargica pandemic led the United States pediatricians to claim that mental disturbances could be caused by organic disease. Lumbar punctures were also included in the investigations in erratic behavior on children, which lead to the discovery of the beneficial effect of stimulants for its treatment in the 1930s.

This would also be called "post-encephalitic behavior disorder." The association of symptoms similar to ADHD in the surviving children eventually led later authors to speculate that whenever the behavior pattern may be present, it may reflect an underlying disturbance of or damage to the brain. The syndrome came to be known as brain-injured child syndrome, to be amended later to minimal brain damage, and subsequently to minimal brain dysfunction.

Following the pandemic, many forms of syndromes related to hyperactivity were described. In 1947, Strauss and Lehtinen reclassified the brain injury syndrome as "endogenous" and "exogenous", where the later would be equivalent to the secondary form of the disorder. The diagnosis also included motor changes, overactivity and underactivity. In the 1930s, Kramer and Pollnow described the "hyperkinetic disorder", very similar to Economo description of encephalitis lethargica, that differed from ADHD for having severe symptomatology and with frequent recovery associated with seizures. Their description became popular on Europe and was included in the World Health Organization’s international classification of disease.

=== Charles Bradley ===
In 1937, the physician and psychiatrist Charles Bradley studied hyperactive children in Emma Pendleton Bradley Home in East Providence, Rhode Island. He examined not only individuals with residual brain damage caused by encephalitis, but also children with "emotional problems". He used pneumoencephalograms to study the children's brain abnormalities, but the exams would result in severe headaches for the patients. Bradley tried to treat the headaches by stimulating the patients choroid plexus with benzedrine, “the most potent stimulant available at the time”. The amphetamine didn't relive the headaches, but it caused striking improvement in performance in some of the children. Bradley then started a systematic trial in 30 children, and half of them had improvements at school. He then theorized that the amphetamines may have stimulated the central nervous system, increasing the children's capability for inhibition. He then studied the children most affected by the drug, and described symptoms similar to what today is understood as ADHD. Bradley is considered the first to treat ADHD.

=== Race to the moon (1957–1967) ===
On October 4, 1957, during the Cold War, Soviet Union successfully launched into orbit the first artificial satellite, Sputnik 1, thus starting the race to the moon. The event came as a great shock to the United States, and there was pressure to train new scientists, engineers and astronauts. There was a reform on the education system, where the progressive education ideas were changed in 1958 to the National Defense Education Act (NDEA). Education became more rigid and in fixed learning environments.

Maurice Laufer and Eric Denhoff studied hyperactive children in Emma Pendleton Bradley Home. Only one third of their patients had brain damage, debunking the term "minimal brain damage" and replacing it with "minimal brain dysfunction". In 1957, they created the diagnosis "hyperkinetic impulse disorder", that was applicable to far more children. The broader definition of hyperkinetic impulse disorder led to its identification in many schools.

Since the end of World War II, psychiatry became a crucial profession in the United States. Treatment for psychological problems left the asylums and became much more popular. In 1963, after the assassination of John F. Kennedy, child psychology came to attention of the United States Congress and became a matter of National importance. The murderer, Lee Harvey Oswald, passed through psychiatric treatment as a child, with no results.

Since the 1950s, pharmaceutical companies made significant investments in anti-psychotics and anti-depressants, as a way to challenge the hegemony of psychoanalysis. The new approach soon became popular, as it had fast results with low cost. In 1962, Ritalin was approved for use in children and sold by Ciba for hyperactivity, but the medicine soon became polemic, as its composition was very similar to banned stimulants and the use of drugs in children for the treatment of a contested disorder was in debate. As an answer, Ciba engaged in a vigorous marketing campaign.

=== Diagnostic and Statistical Manual of Mental Disorders (DSM) terminology ===
Years	Name		From
1968 to 1980	Hyperkinetic Reaction of Childhood (Hyperkinetic disorder)		DSM-II
1980 to 1987	Attention-Deficit Disorder with or without hyperactivity		DSM-III
1987 to 1994	Attention-Deficit Hyperactivity Disorder		DSM-III-R
1994 to present	Attention-Deficit/Hyperactivity Disorder	With combined presentation [ADHD-C]	DSM-IV, DSM-IV-TR, DSM-5
1994 to present	Attention-Deficit/Hyperactivity Disorder	With predominantly inattentive presentation [ADHD-I]	DSM-IV, DSM-IV-TR, DSM-5
1994 to present	Attention-Deficit/Hyperactivity Disorder	With predominantly hyperactive/impulsive presentation [ADHD-H]	DSM-IV, DSM-IV-TR, DSM-5

The clinical definition of "ADHD" dates to the mid-20th century, but was known by other names. Physicians developed a diagnosis for a set of conditions variously referred to as "minimal brain damage", "minimal brain dysfunction", "minimal brain disorder", "learning/behavioral disabilities" and "hyperactivity". Some of these labels became problematic as knowledge expanded. For example, as awareness grew that many children with no indication of brain damage also displayed the syndrome, the label which included the words "brain damage" did not seem appropriate.

The DSM-II (1968) began to call it "Hyperkinetic Reaction of Childhood" (Hyperkinetic disorder) even though the professionals were aware that many of the children so diagnosed exhibited attention deficits without any signs of hyperactivity. In 1980, the DSM-III introduced the term "ADD (Attention-Deficit Disorder) with or without hyperactivity." That terminology (ADD) was retired with the revision in 1987 to ADHD in the DSM-III-R. In the DSM-IV, published in 1994, ADHD with sub-types and the grammatical clarification of “Attention-Deficit/Hyperactivity Disorder” was presented. The DSM-IV-TR was released in 2000, primarily to correct factual errors and make changes to reflect recent research; ADHD was largely unchanged. The DSM-5 (2013) retired the ADHD “sub-type” terminology (replacing them with “presentations”), added two new modifiers to the diagnosis so that the severity (mild, moderate, or severe) of the disorder can be specified and could be coded as “in partial remission” if the full diagnostic criteria isn’t currently met, as well as removing autism spectrum disorder as an exclusionary diagnosis.

=== Adult ADHD diagnostic expansion ===
In the 1970s, American research began to study the symptoms and development of children diagnosed with ADHD. In 1976, Paul Wender proposed 61 items (WURS-61) for the diagnostic of ADHD in adults, the so-called Wender-Utah or Wender-Reimherr Criteria. Later, 25 of the items were selected (WURS-25) and used by the DSM. By the 1980s, research was published confirming the continuation of ADHD symptoms beyond childhood. Some controversy exists over the findings of scholars such as Gabrielle Weiss in 1986, which showed a 66% continuation of symptoms into adulthood, contrasted with a lower 31% reported by Gittleman et al. in 1985. Research continued, often based on the model that ADHD could only be continued and not recognized and diagnosed newly in adults and adolescents. Publications by individuals, including Kelly and Ramundo as well as Hallowell and Ratey in the 1990s, complicated this model by not only leading to self-diagnosis, but through promoting the social model of disability. There exists significant social and medical debate surrounding medication. This is influenced by media and agenda setting. As analyzed by Conrad and Potter, "ironically, controversy about ADHD raises the public's awareness and increases the diffusion of information about the disorder, which can indirectly contribute to diagnostic expansion."

== Environmental factors ==
There were other important environmental factors that were pointed out as a possible cause for the rise numbers of ADHD children. One of them is the popularization of processed food and food additives. The subject came to attention when Ben Feingold published Why Your Child is Hyperactive (1974), even though the first known link between hyperactivity and allergies is from W. Ray Shannon, in 1922. Feingold arguments are considered polemical and have been debated extensively, with no conclusion up until at least 2014.

Another important factor under discussion is the urbanization process. Many authors, including Richard Louv, argue that life in cities tend to turn kids hyperactive due a more stagnant lifestyle and access to television and video games, what he called "nature deficit disorder". In 2012, UK National Trust has published a report showing that ADHD children with access to nature experienced reduced symptoms.

Another possible factor is the decline of corporal punishment, that has happened since 1960s. It is thought that hyperactive children were simply better conditioned when physical punishment was applied.

== See also ==
- History of psychiatry
- Medicalization
- Medical sociology
