= Alexander Crichton =

Scottish physician and author (1763–1856)

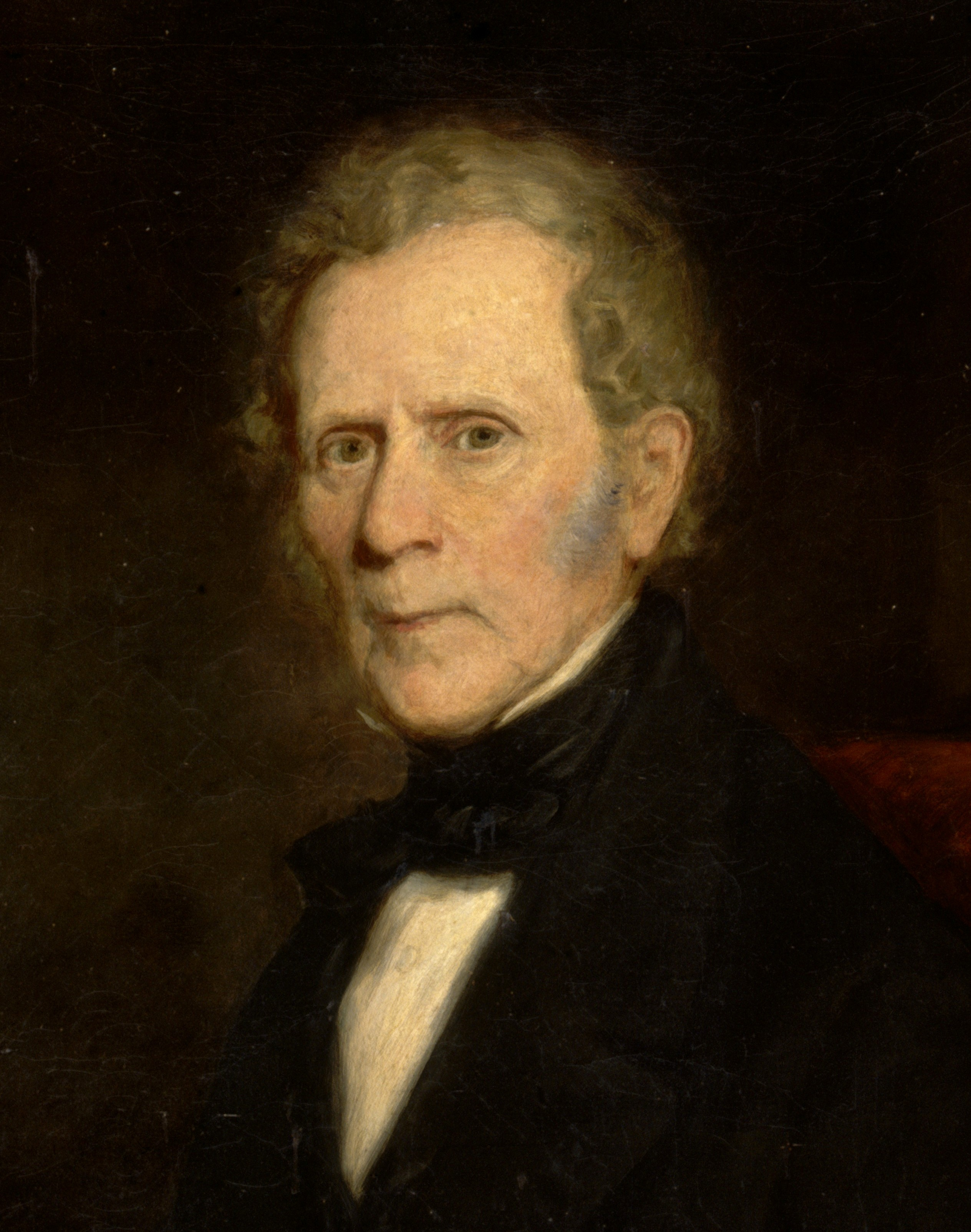
- Born: 2 December 1763; Newington, Edinburgh, Scotland
- Died: 4 June 1856 (aged 92)
- Occupations: Doctor of medicine; physician; author

Sir Alexander Crichton (2 December 1763 – 4 June 1856) was a Scottish physician and author.

== Medical career ==
Born in Newington, Edinburgh, Crichton received his M.D. from Leiden University, The Netherlands, in 1785. He developed his medical skills through studies at Paris, Stuttgart, Vienna, and Halle. He returned to London in 1789, becoming MRCS but by 1791 he had moved from surgery, becoming a member of the Royal College of Physicians, and a Fellow of the Linnean Society of London in 1793, holding the post of physician at Westminster Hospital between 1794 and 1801.

In 1803, Crichton was invited to become the emperor of Russia's personal physician, and between 1804 and 1819 was appointed Physician in Ordinary (personal physician) to Tsar Alexander I of Russia and to Maria Feodorovna, the Dowager Empress. He was also head of medical services in that country, receiving several Russian and Prussian honours.

Crichton married Frances Dodwell in 1800. She was the granddaughter of Henry and Dulcibella Dodwell and co-heiress of the Morant estate in Jamaica, which formed part of her marriage settlement. The list of assets for the Morant estate in 1832 included 247 enslaved people. When slavery was abolished in 1834, compensation was awarded to previous owners of enslaved people, based on the asset lists of their holdings.

He encouraged his nephew, Archibald William Crichton to follow him to Russia. Archibald went on to have a long and successful career there, where his descendants constituted an influential family.

== Geological studies ==
Retiring to England, Crichton wrote several books dealing with medical and geological subjects, becoming a member of the Geological Society in 1811. Crichton's extensive collection of minerals consisted mainly of specimens from Siberia, Russia, Norway, Hungary, Germany, the UK, the US and India. These were acquired during his tenure as physician to Alexander I of Russia and during his travels throughout Europe when he was studying medicine.

== CDS & ADHD pioneer ==
He was the first person to distinguish between at least two kinds of disorders of attention, one a disorder of distractibility, lack of sustained attention, and poor inhibition resembling present-day combined presentation of attention deficit hyperactivity disorder (ADHD). And the other a disorder of low power, arousal, or selective/oriented attention closely resembling that of cognitive disengagement syndrome (CDS), in his book An inquiry into the nature and origin of mental derangement: comprehending a concise system of the physiology and pathology of the human mind and a history of the passions and their effects (1798). Crichton was the second person to describe ADHD (after Melchior Adam Weikard) and made the first mention to and description of CDS.

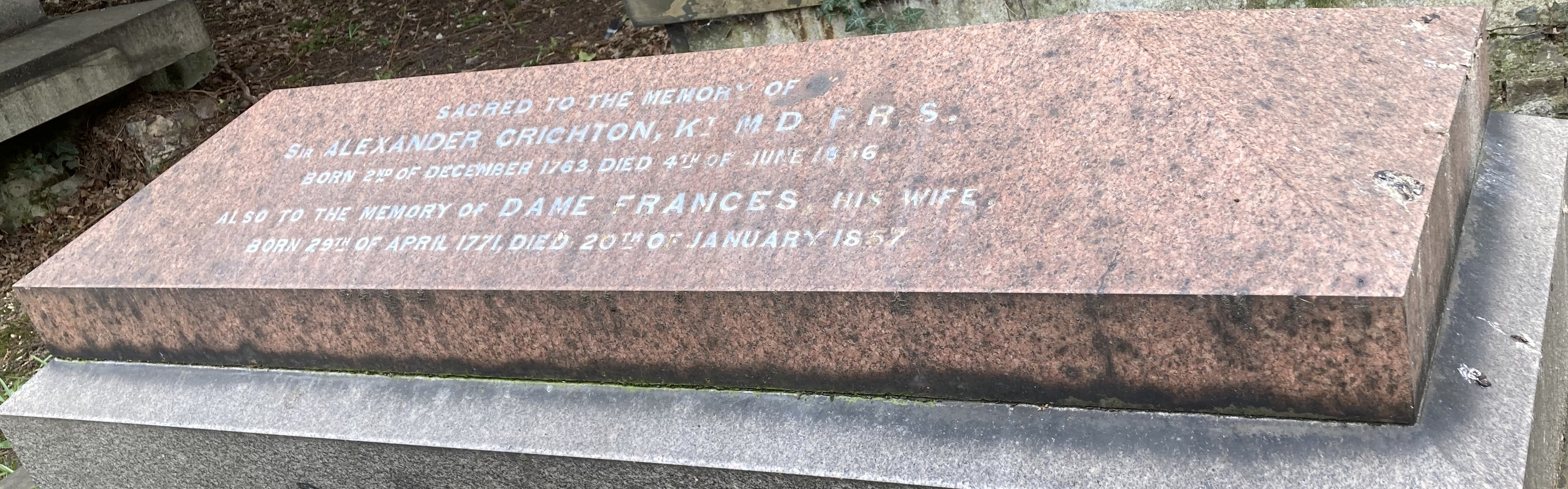
Grave of Alexander Crichton in West Norwood Cemetery

== Death ==
Crichton died at The Groves, near Sevenoaks, and was buried at West Norwood Cemetery, where his monument is a gabled granite slab.

== See also ==
- History of attention deficit hyperactivity disorder
