= Kinesia paradoxa =

Medical phenomenon

Kinesia paradoxa (or kinesia paradoxica) is a phenomenon most often seen in people with Parkinson's disease where individuals who typically experience severe difficulties with the simple movements may perform complex movements easily. Specifically, kinesia paradoxa focuses on walking, referring to the sudden ability to demonstrate smooth, fluid movements in people that previously had problems with walking easily. This new discovery does not just happen to an individual randomly, but must be stimulated using various types of visual or auditory cues.

This phenomenon is generally stimulated to help improve the mobility of people with akinesia. Akinesia consists of changes in walking pattern, freezing of gait (FOG), and losses of balance (LOBs). FOG occurs in the middle of stride, cutting off walking, and making it fairly difficult for a person to re-initiate a movement. Kinesia paradoxa can be used as a management strategy to overcome this. LOBs are when a person has difficulty maintaining an upright position and lose their balance, eventually leading to them falling. Since Parkinson’s disease is a progressive disease, patient’s symptoms continue to worsen with time and they often develop visible differences in their walking that greatly affects their quality of life. These differences include shuffling of steps, decreased stride length, and decrease in overall movement. Kinesia paradoxa is not able to be stimulated in everyone with movement disorders; persons who can stimulate this phenomenon demonstrate visible improvements in mobility including, increased stride length, more fluidity in strides, less FOGs incidents, less LOBs, and those that appeared to be completely frozen previously can regain their movement. More recently, kinesia paradoxa is also being used to treat children with Asperger's syndrome. Children with Asperger's demonstrate excellent skills in drawing, modeling, building, and computer games, but often struggle with everyday motor tasks such as walking or catching a ball. Kinesia paradoxa is currently being explored to help aid these individuals in focusing their attention and improving their efficiency in these simple motor tasks.

== History ==
One of the first studies on kinesia paradoxa was conducted in 1967 by James Martin. He examined the effects of different visual cues to facilitate natural walking and found that transverse lines that were one or two inches wide and a contrasting color produced the maximum effect. He studied the effects from different obstacles, types of lines, different contrasts, and how outside stimuli affected kinesia paradoxa. Since this primary study, more progress has been made to explore this topic and methods to stimulate it. It is still fairly new in the research field and there is much more future research to be conducted before this topic can be fully understood.

== Mechanism of action ==
There is currently no known mechanism to explain kinesia paradoxa, but it is believed to be a normal property of the motor system. The reasoning behind the sudden movement is still very unclear and a variable topic of research that has not yet been studied electrophysiologically. There are a few hypotheses that are currently being studied which include:

Additional feedback to the brain

Individuals with Parkinson's have a lack of dopaminergic cells which results in the difficulty with movement. Providing additional feedback to the brain can help overcome the problems individuals have with internal cueing.

Circuits in the brain

Visual cues are believed to activate specific motor pathways in the brain. These pathways allow the damaged circuits from Parkinson's to be bypassed, resulting in normal motor function. Cerebellar sensory-motor pathway are currently being explored to try and prove this hypothesis.

Part of the initiation, not the pathway

If the circuits in the brain do not play a role in stimulating kinesia paradoxa, the initiation of this stimulation should be explored to be a possible explanation. Additional firing within the brain could be a possible explanation to these improved movements.

Possible genotype

A possible genotype might make an individual more likely to be able to stimulate kinesia paradoxa, but currently there is no current research on this idea. It is difficult to support this idea with scientific research.

== Benefits ==
It has been documented that people with Parkinson's disease experience a dramatic change in lifestyle due to their symptoms. Since this disease is classified as a progressive disorder, symptoms only continue to worsen and improvement is rarely seen. A person’s walking ability is one area that a difference is dramatically noticeable. Due to these dramatic changes in walking, patients have problems completing simple household tasks on their own. They often suffer from social isolation because they are embarrassed by their symptoms or their symptoms prevent them from leaving their home. As symptoms worsen, almost always is there a decrease in physical activity, which puts these individuals at a greater risk for many other diseases such as heart disease. Through kinesia paradoxa a patient is able to dramatically improve their walking ability, with improvements in one or even all aspects of walking. Improvements include larger stride length, more fluid movements, increase arm swing, decreased shuffling of steps, less incidents of FOG, and fewer LOBs. These all improve the mobility of a person and help improve their quality of life. They are able to complete more household tasks independently, since movements through doorways and hallways is easier, as well as participate in activities within the community. People suffering from Parkinson’s disease often tend to experience some form of depression after diagnosis, but with kinesia paradoxa this could be overcome.

Kinesia paradoxa also seems to be one of the better forms of treatment or management strategy used compared to the other available options. The current options to treat akinesia are not always effective and their effects tend to wear off quickly. Dopaminergic medications are the most commonly used form of treatment to attempt to replace the lack of dopamine in Parkinson’s patients. These medications have shown to be ineffective for a majority of patients and often result in long-term negative secondary effects. FOGs and LOBs often respond poorly and often paradoxically to these types of medications. Brain surgery is also a possible strategy to manage side effects, but is very disruptive and invasive. Many surgeries result in severe discomfort for the patient and often have no resulting effect. Another alternative is deep brain stimulation (DBS), which seems to be effective in many cases. DBS seems very promising, but is a very new area of research that can result in serious complications. Due to this, it is not a primary treatment method just yet.

== Concerns ==
The main concern with kinesia paradoxa is that as soon as the virtual cues or obstacles are removed, the person almost immediately returns to their old walking pattern consisting of shuffling of steps, FOG, and LOBs. The possibility of retraining a person to internally cue is being explored, but thus far has been ineffective. Based on studies, it has been demonstrated that the longer a person has suffered from Parkinson’s the less this treatment works. The more severe the symptoms are, the more dramatic a visual cue must be in order to be effective. L-dopa medications and their effects on kinesia paradoxa should also be explored further to see if they play an important role in stimulating kinesia paradoxa. For this to be a worthwhile form of treatment or management strategy for Parkinson’s patients, it must be able to be stimulated consistently and with ease. Some methods that will be described in detail later are simple and low in cost, but are only temporary methods. The more permanent methods are extremely high in cost and this must be weighed when determining the most suitable treatment method for a patient.

== Methods to stimulate ==
Internal cueing is often noted to be the first to disappear, but persons with Parkinson's disease are usually still able to elicit external cues. Due to this some form of external cue is necessary to stimulate kinesia paradoxa. Once FOG occurs, it is often very difficult for a person to fight it and immediately return to normal walking, so kinesia paradoxa must be stimulated before this occurs to prevent it all together. Contrast, size of the cue, loudness of the cue, and many more features must be analyzed in order to determine the most effect method to stimulate kinesia paradoxa for a person. Each person will respond to each cue differently, so great exploration and experimentation must be completed before finding the optimal method. Below specific examples of visual cues, auditory cues, and methods of attention focusing are discussed in great deal focusing on the benefits and concerns of each method.

=== Visual cues ===
There are a variety of visual cues that are able to stimulate kinesia paradoxa, some more effective than others. For these visual cues there are a variety of factors that must be considered. The most important factor is contrast, because the more visible the feature the more likely it is to effectively stimulate kinesia paradoxa. For visual cues, the size of the visual cue is also important, but there is no standard size that is used, it just depends on the individual.

==== Tile and floor patterns ====
Alternating floor tiles can help stimulate kinesia paradoxa. If this method is effective for an individual it can make maneuvering about the house much easier. Individuals can focus on stepping specifically over one color tile.

==== Lines or pieces of paper on the floor ====
Stepping over a piece of paper on the floor or having lines visible on the ground can often be very effective and is very cheap method. contrast is extremely important in this method: if the floor is dark, then white paper or lines are most effective and if the floor is light colored, then dark paper or lines are most effective. For lines to be most beneficial they must be transverse in the direction of walking. zig-zag or sideways lines have been shown to not be nearly as effective. A simple computer piece of paper has been shown to work, but in the case of lines often something only one to two inches in width is helpful in improving the mobility through kinesia paradoxa.

Refer to the first video in external links of a man that can overcome his akinesia with a simple paper cue. Note, how quickly he returns to his previous walking style after the paper cues are gone.

==== Obstacles on the ground ====
Large obstacles placed at the feet of an individual such as blocks or another person’s foot have been shown to be very effective in stimulating kinesia paradoxa. For this method, cost is also not a concern but a serious problem is that sometimes the patient believes that they are taking a much larger step than they actually are. This results in the individual stepping directly on the obstacle or tripping over it if it is too large. This can be dangerous and result in additional falls, so an appropriate size of the obstacle must be determined for each individual.

==== Manipulations to currently used walking aids ====
Simple manipulations to walking aids that are already being used by the individual have been shown to be extremely effective, but do not result in tripping incidents as the obstacles described above. Three examples include inverting a walking cane, adding zip ties to a walker, having a tennis ball swing from a cane. Inverting a walking cane creates a simple u-shaped curve on the ground that the individual can focus on stepping over. The zip ties have the same effect. Brightly colored zip ties create the most contrast and act as a guide when an individual is walking. With zip ties, they are large enough to be effective, but not strong enough to trip an individual; if they cannot step over tem completely, the zip ties are able to easily bend with their walking. The final method is having a tennis ball swing from a cane. The individual can focus on kicking the ball with each step and overcome many cases of FOG.

==== Virtual cueing spectacles ====
Virtual cueing spectacles are being explored through research. The device is worn like a pair of glasses by the individual and projects lines at the patient’s feet. When the individual is stationary, the lines appear to be still, but as soon as the individual looks up slightly and begins to walk the lines scroll encouraging them to step over the appearing obstacle. The goal with this device is for it to be worn at all times, and studies have shown that these cueing glasses continue to remain effective with time. A concern with this device is that they are high in cost and not every Parkinson's patient would be able to afford them.

Refer to the second, third, and fourth external link to see different types of virtual cueing spectacles being used to overcome akinesia. Each is of a different form, but effectively helps the individual improve fluidity in their walking.

=== Auditory cues ===
visual have been shown to be the most effective method in stimulating kinesia paradoxa, but in some cases auditory cues have also been beneficial. With auditory cues the volume must be considered and the consistency of the beat. In almost all cases of auditory cues, it is all about following a rhythm. The most common methods to stimulate kinesia paradoxa with auditory cues is listening to music, using a metronome, or walking to specific commands. By listening to music, an individual can focus on walking to the exact beat of the music and the music often eliminates outside distractions. A metronome produces regular tick sounds, so similar to music an individual can easily follow the beat being produced. A final auditory cue is walking to specific commands, such as marching commands like a soldier. Having another individual dictate these commands is most useful. All of these techniques are variable, and their effectiveness varies with each individual. There are also numerous other methods to create auditory cues, but the ones discussed are some of the most common.

=== Focusing attention ===
Kinesia paradoxa can very easily be stimulated by visual and auditory cues, but there is an additional method that does not require any external cues. By having an individual focus all their attention on walking or another movement, they are sometimes able to control akinesia in its early stages. For example, in a common household akinesia is much more common because the patient is not only focusing on their walking because of the excess of additional distractions in the home. Often eliminating some of these distractions and learning to focus all attention on walking can help improve mobility. This is also true when participating in other activities such as cycling. When an individual focuses only on their pedaling, they are often able to facilitate smooth movements. This method is only effective in very rare cases and those that are not extreme, so if proven unhelpful visual and auditory cues should be explored further.

=== External Pacing ===
Kinesia paradoxa can also be stimulated by external pacing cues such as cycling, or walking on a treadmill. Exercises such as cycling or walking have been shown to enhance gait, mobility and quality of life in patients with Parkinson’s Disease. Because of these aforementioned benefits, external pacing cues such as cycling or treadmill use could play an important role in the rehabilitation and exercise training of patients with Parkinson's disease who are grounded by freezing of gait. In addition, it has been suggested that the ability to cycle could be an important component in diagnosis of Parkinson’s Disease.

== Current and future research ==
Since little information is known about kinesia paradoxa, it is still being researched in great detail. Current research is being performed to try and narrow down a single hypothesis explaining the mechanism. New methods to stimulate the phenomenon are also being explored. Specifically, the virtual cueing spectacles are being tested to become a permanent method for individuals to wear at all times to overcome problems in mobility.

== See also ==
- Stimulation
- Gait
- Dopaminergic
- Deep brain stimulation
- Sensory cues
