= Cognitive tempo =

Term of cognitive psychology

Cognitive tempo (a term of cognitive psychology, also known as reflectivity/impulsivity) is a type of cognitive style defined as the extent to which an individual differs in terms of their ability to respond carefully and slowly, as opposed to quickly and with errors. Cognitive tempo can be assessed using the Matching Familiar Figures Test (MFFT) developed by Jerome Kagan in 1964.

== Matching Familiar Figures Test (MFFT) ==
The MFFT asks individuals to find a specific item that exactly matches what they are shown at the top of a page in which all items on the page are similar to the item they are given at the top. In order to find what was requested, an individual must pay close attention to all the given options. Individuals can respond very slowly to the task and take their time, or individuals can respond very quickly. Some individuals make very few errors, even when the match is difficult. Others may make numerous errors, even when the match is very simple. Those who respond rapidly and make many errors demonstrate an impulsive style, while those who respond slowly and make fewer errors demonstrate a reflective style.

== See also ==
- Sluggish cognitive tempo (SCT)
