= Archibald William Crichton =

Scottish physician in Russia (1791–1865)

Archibald William Crichton (1791 in Edinburgh – 1865) was a Scottish physician who had a successful career in Imperial Russia.

Archibald was the son of Lieutenant-Colonel Patrick Crichton and Margaret Lambie. Also he was the nephew of Alexander Crichton. Alexander became the personal physician of Tsar Alexander I of Russia and his mother Maria Feodorovna in 1804, and held that post until 1819. After Archibald qualified as a medical doctor in Edinburgh in 1810, he accepted an offer of a position in Russia arranged by his uncle. He became a medical supervisor charged with developing a mineral spa resort in the Caucasus Mountains. He was successful in controlling an outbreak of the plague there, for which he was granted the knight cross of the Order of Saint Vladimir (fourth class).

In 1813 he joined the Imperial Russian Army, providing medical care to French prisoners of war held in Riga, Latvia. However, following the intervention of his friend –another Scottish doctor in the Imperial Russian Army – James Wylie, he joined the Tsar's entourage, with whom he travelled on campaign to Paris.

In 1816 he was appointed personal physician to Grand Duke Nicholas, brother of Alexander I, and who succeeded him to the throne in 1825 to become Tsar Nicholas I of Russia.
