= Bradyphrenia =

Slow mental activity

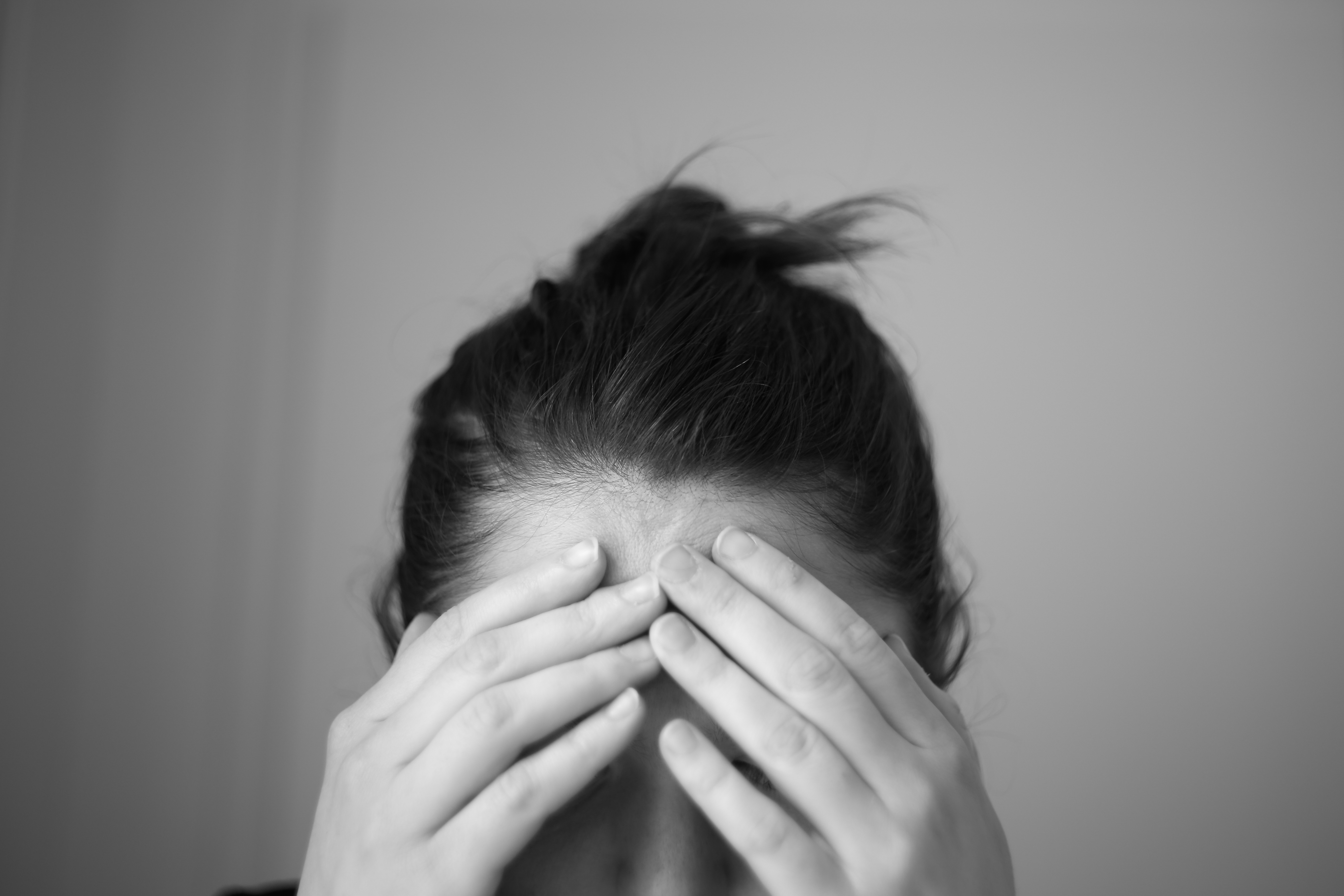
- Image depicting how an individual with bradyphrenia experiences fatigue and stress as they struggle with slow thinking.
- Specialty: Neurology, psychiatry
- Symptoms: Slowing of thoughts, delayed responses and lack of motivation

Bradyphrenia is the slowness of thought common to many disorders of the brain. Disorders characterized by bradyphrenia include Parkinson's disease and forms of schizophrenia consequently causing a delayed response and fatigue. Patients with bradyphrenia may describe or may manifest slowed thought processes, evidenced by increased latency of response and also involve severe memory impairment and poor motor control. The word 'bradyphrenia' originates from the ancient Greek meaning 'slow mind.'

Bradyesthesia refers to the slowness of perception. The term originated from the word "aisthesis" which means sensation.

== Evaluation ==
=== Parkinsonism ===
In his research, Steck found that almost half the patients with Parkinson's disease in the psychiatric ward during the post-encephalitic period had bradyphrenia. Neurologists often saw the condition as an additional trait of Parkinson's disease, as they found that patients with Parkinson's disease often had impaired traits that would be defined by bradyphrenia. In the study conducted in 1966, Wilson et al. had found that bradyphrenia found in the patients with Parkinson's disease had increased their reaction time of retaining information. Other studies exploring this theory confirmed that bradyphrenia was commonly seen in patients with Parkinson's disease. In addition, some researchers found that the condition does not impact all patients with Parkinson's disease.

Some neurologists had also suggested that bradyphrenia could exist without the presence of parkinsonism. In some cases, it has been found that bradyphrenia has been mistaken for an inability to strategically complete tasks and therefore may often be categorised as the condition incorrectly. Collectively, it was concluded that bradyphrenia does not commonly appear in parkinsonism but rather as a single entity that occurs in other conditions and not only in the presence of Parkinson's disease.

Despite the collective agreement of bradyphrenia being classified as a nosological entity, the neurological condition is still more often described in case studies where the subjects are analysed for having Parkinson's disease.

==== Effects in Parkinson's disease ====
There are several symptoms in Parkinson's disease which are influenced by the presence of bradyphrenia. Researcher Norberg discovered that a gradual cognitive slowing impacted the eating behaviour of these patients. It was found that patients with Parkinson's disease would often experience extended periods of time attempting to process the food that they are eating, causing an increase in the time it took for them to consume their food.

In another study examining the presence of bradyphrenia in Parkinson's disease, researchers had discovered that bradyphrenia was one of the reasons for slow auditory feedback as measured by the DAF (Delayed Auditory Feedback). Dobbs et al., completed an experiment whereby the experimenter would communicate to the patient via a microphone and would ask the participant to complete a series of tasks. The participant, with or without Parkinson's disease, would receive this information through their headphones and respond via a microphone. The experimenters had asked the participants to complete the following tasks: count to 20, repeat several simple sentences, and read a series of words from a card. The researchers concluded that bradyphrenia was present in Parkinson's disease as well as in older patients, as they also had delayed feedback when completing the task.

==== Depression and Parkinson's disease ====
Researchers Rogers et al. found bradyphrenia in Parkinson's disease was considerably similar to what is referred to as psychomotor retardation. Psychomotor retardation was proposed by the researchers as a condition particularly seen in major depressive disorders. Researchers conducted a study to examine similarities between the two conditions by analysing patients diagnosed with Parkinson's disease and those diagnosed with depression. The participants were given two tasks to complete; one was the digit symbol substitution test, which consisted of the participants filling in a row of numbers which had a specific connection to a symbol. The other task, referred to as the 'simpler task', was to match a number on the screen that they had seen by pressing the same number on the keyboard. Both tasks required a fast reaction time, as patients' response was measured by how quickly (in seconds) they responded to each of the tasks. Researchers found that there had been no significant decrease in the response time for this test in participants with Parkinson's disease as their reaction time had been longer. However, for participants having major depressive disorder, there had been an overall improvement in reaction time. Rogers, Lees and Smith concluded that bradyphrenia in the presence of Parkinson's disease was very similar to psychomotor retardation in a major depressive disorder with a few differences. They had found that there had been notable impairments in dopaminergic areas seen in both disorders that could constitute some similarities between the two conditions.

=== Alzheimer's disease ===
Alzheimer's disease is another neurological condition involving cognition impairment. Researchers observed the presence of cognitive slowing in patients with Alzheimer's; Pate and Margolin found that this was caused by damage to the cortical central. The cortical central is the outer region of the cerebellum, a major component of the brain that controls motor functions. Evidence of bradyphrenia has been observed in patients with Alzheimer's, particularly in older populations.

=== Depression ===
Evidence of bradyphrenia has been observed in patients with depression with previous neurological damage. In a study of elderly patients, it was found that patients with depression had not shown a significant delay in thought processing compared to patients with depression and additional neurological damage to a part of their brain.

Yet Rogers et al. examined bradyphrenia and whether or not it was indicated by 'mental rotation' in melancholic and non-melancholic depressed patients. Researchers would ask the participants to participate in numerous tasks whereby their performance would be measured by their reaction time and accuracy of response. The tasks that participants were asked to perform included determining which direction a stimulus on the screen was pointing towards and if a stimulus shown was in the normal positioning or had been reversed. From this study, researchers had concluded that in melancholic participants with major depression, their slowing in reaction time was higher than that of the control group, which indicated the presence of bradyphrenia. Researchers had drawn the conclusion that the lesser slowness of the non-melancholic depressed groups in these tasks had not been intense enough to be considered bradyphrenia.

=== Huntington's disease and schizophrenia ===
Bradyphrenia had also been observed in Huntington's disease and schizophrenia. To examine the role of bradyphrenia within these conditions, the researchers used the Tower of London Test, which is a task that requires cognitive processing. This study had shown that there had been a significant increase in time that it took for patients with Huntington's to solve the problem. Participants with schizophrenia, however, performed the tasks in a shorter amount of time than those in the control group. Hanes suggested that bradyphrenia in schizophrenia was not as common as it was in Huntington's disease.

=== Addiction ===
Experts including Martin et al. discovered that bradyphrenia is seen as one of the first stages of the ramifications of overdosing on an opioid like heroin. Bradyphrenia, however, had been considered the most 'minor' of the ramifications. Martin et al. found that stage three of symptoms of overdose entailed the high risk around 20% of those that reach what has been described as 'stage three' will die. A case report was done on a 63-year-old man who had been hospitalised for ten days and has been released with no notable impairments. The patient was hospitalised again several days later after showing abnormal behaviours, which specialists described as bradyphrenia. The patient's abnormal behaviour included having a diminished attention span as well as being unable to remember minor details. Researchers related this worsening of behaviour to abnormal neurological activity within the pre-frontal cortex. The patient's cognitive abilities had improved with the use of an antioxidant therapy, yet with some acts of abnormal behaviours still showing.

== Management ==
Currently, there are no pharmaceutical medications that will directly increase the rate of thoughts in patients with bradyphrenia experience. The treatments for Parkinson's disease have been imposed as a model for treatment of bradyphrenia as in some cases the researchers have been able to treat the condition in patients with Parkinson's.

=== Steroid therapy ===
During the time of the encephalitis lethargica period, the rise of bradyphrenia was seen in many of the cases. In one case in Russia it was believed that this condition could be treated with steroid therapy after the patient's condition had improved after three months using steroid. In another more recent case, an 80-year-old woman had been diagnosed with Cerebral Amyloid Angiopathy (CAA) and was described to have symptoms of bradyphrenia after showing abnormalities within the pre-frontal cortex of the brain through a magnetic resonance imaging system (MRI) that had shown a significant increase in lesions. The patient had been put on steroid therapy which researchers McHugh et al. had found a significant improvement of cognitive abilities over time. The effectiveness of steroid therapy had been observed within an MRI improvement as the number of lesions had decreased as well as the shift in behaviours of participants.

=== L-DOPA and carbidopa regimen ===
In one trial it was found that bradyphrenia as well as bradykinesia, could be treated using the combination of a L-DOPA and carbidopa regimen. This combination was believed to alter these effects of Parkinson's disease. In the short term, this combination had brought positive results as behaviours of these patients had improved. Yet these researchers found that in the long-term this combination provided a reverse effect, accelerating the cognitive slowing of the brain (bradyphrenia) and motor movement (bradykinesia).

=== H_{2} antagonists ===
H_{2} antagonists is a class of drugs that was found to provide positive outcomes throughout the treatment of Parkinson's disease. Some studies have shown that through oral admission, the H_{2} antagonist will target specific receptors in the brain by crossing the blood–brain barrier and will alter the rate of cognitive thought processing. Psychiatrist Kaminski found an improvement of this condition in Parkinson's disease with a positive correlation between the decrease of time in cognitive thought processing and the decrease in reaction time for tasks to be completed.

== History ==
=== Encephalitis lethargica era ===
The first sightings of bradyphrenia were documented by French neurologist Naville in the early 20th century, during the time of the epidemic of encephalitis lethargica, as it appears, he was investigating this disorder. This epidemic involved inflammation of the brain (encephalitis), and affected people tended to experience mental delays and remain motionless for extended periods of time due to an unknown cause. Naville was dealing with patients experiencing several symptoms which he could only describe as a gradual brain impairment. Several symptoms listed included decreased attention span, memory and lack of motivation to perform any tasks. Naville had also observed the facial expressions of his patients with these symptoms' had become stagnant and disinterested over time. Since Naville's publications in 1922, researchers often referred to this condition as 'psychic torpor' being translated as 'mental inactivity.'

=== Post-encephalitis lethargica era ===
Swiss neurologist Steck completed a study investigating the case of bradyphrenia post- an epidemic, in 27 mental institutions. Within his research, he found that more than half of the patients hospitalised had the condition Following Steck's discovery, for some period there had been no active research into the causes of bradyphrenia. Steck's work stimulated the interest of other neurologists including Aubrun, who investigated bradyphrenia creating a new direction by linking it to Parkinson's disease. Gradually, more neurologists began exploring bradyphrenia in the presence of other disorders including Alzheimer's disease, loss of motor control and psychiatric disorders.

== See also ==
- Cognitive disengagement syndrome
