= Parkinsonian gait =

Type of gait due to Parkinson's disease

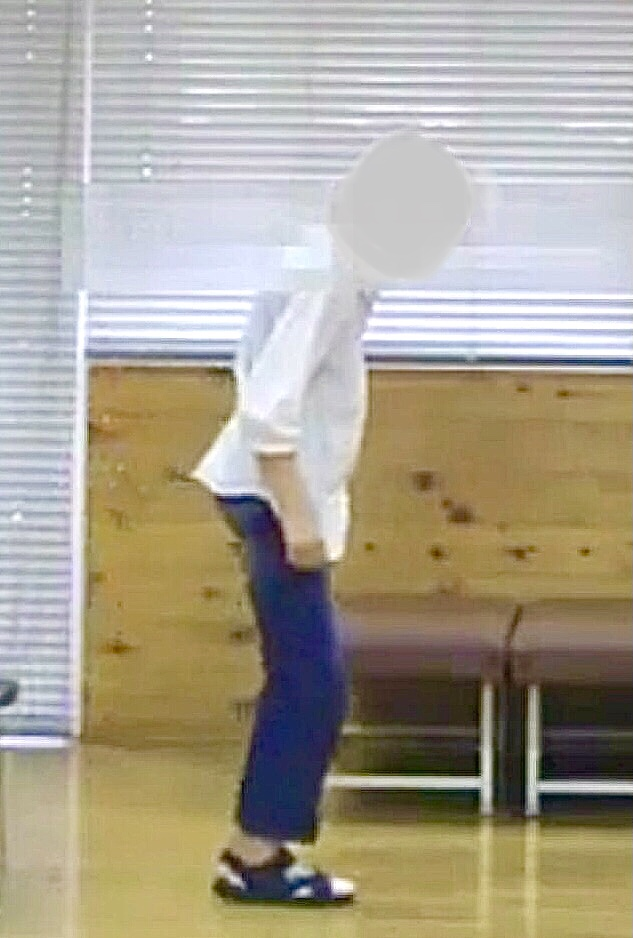
Parkinsonian gait (indoor)

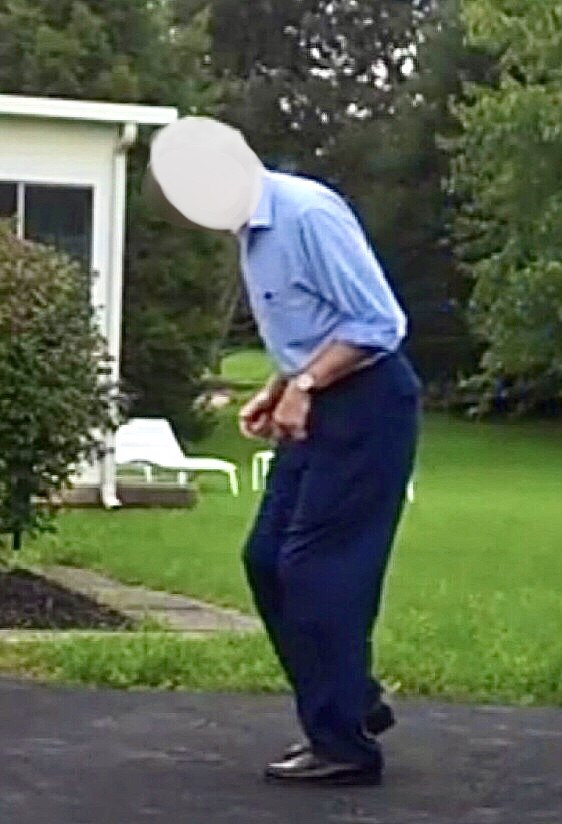
Parkinsonian gait (outdoor)

Features of PD gait are more obvious in the side view.

Parkinsonian gait (or festinating gait, from Latin festinare [to hurry]) is the type of gait exhibited by patients with Parkinson's disease (PD). It is often described by people with Parkinson's as feeling like being stuck in place, when initiating a step or turning, and can increase the risk of falling. This disorder is caused by a deficiency of dopamine in the basal ganglia circuit leading to motor deficits. Gait is one of the most affected motor characteristics of this disorder although symptoms of Parkinson's disease are varied.

Parkinsonian gait is characterized by small shuffling steps and a general slowness of movement (hypokinesia), or even the total loss of movement (akinesia) in extreme cases. Patients with PD demonstrate reduced stride length, walking speed during free ambulation and cadence rate, while double support duration is increased. The patient has difficulty starting, but also has difficulty stopping after starting. This is due to muscle hypertonicity.

== Abnormal gait characteristics ==
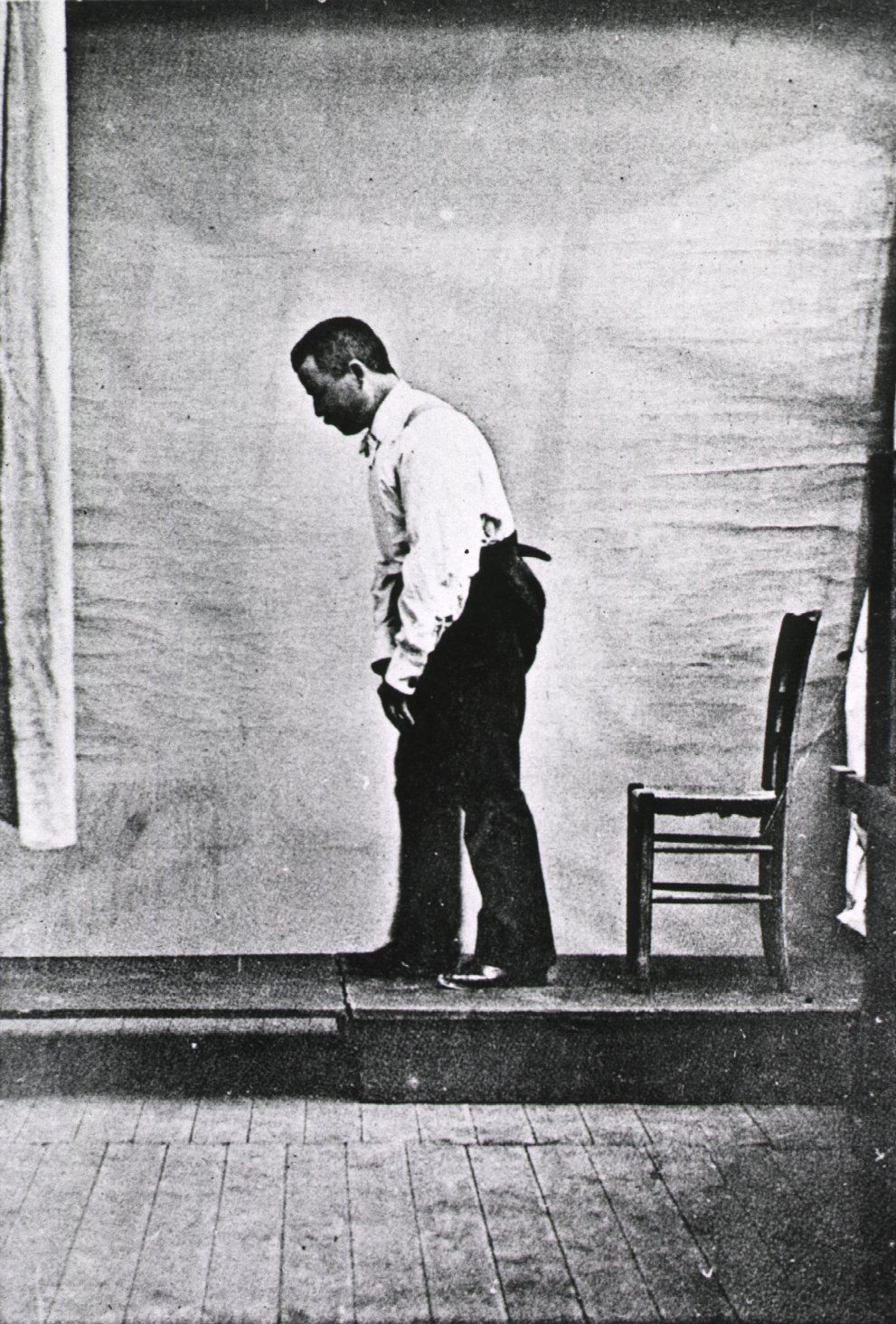
Parkinson's disease patient showing a flexed walking posture pictured in 1892, from Nouvelle Iconographie de la Salpètrière, vol. 5

Patients with Parkinson's disease exhibit gait characteristics that are markedly different from normal gait. While the list of abnormal gait characteristics given below is the most discussed, it is certainly not exhaustive.

=== Heel to toe characteristics ===
Whereas in normal gait, the heel strikes the ground before the toes (also called heel-to-toe walking), in Parkinsonian gait, motion is characterised by flat foot strike (where the entire foot is placed on the ground at the same time) or less often and in the more advanced stages of the disease by toe-to-heel walking (where the toes touch the ground before the heel). In addition, PD patients have reduced foot lifting during the swing phase of gait, which produces smaller clearance between the toes and the ground.

Patients with Parkinson's disease have reduced impact at heel strike and this mechanism has been found to be related to the disease severity with impact decreasing as the disease progresses. Also, Parkinson patients show a trend towards higher relative loads in the forefoot regions combined with a load shift towards medial foot areas. This load shift is believed to help in compensating for postural imbalance. The intra-individual variability in foot strike pattern is found to be surprisingly lower in PD patients compared with those with a typical gait.

=== Vertical ground reaction force ===
In normal gait, the vertical ground reaction force (GRF) plot has two peaks – one when the foot strikes the ground and the second peak is caused by push-off force from the ground. The shape of the vertical GRF signal is abnormal in PD. In the earlier stages of the disease, reduced forces (or peak heights) are found for heel contact and the push-off phase resembling that of elderly subjects. In the more advanced stages of the disorder where gait is characterized by small shuffling steps, PD patients show only one narrow peak in the vertical GRF signal.

=== Falls and freezing of gait ===
Falls and freezing of gait are two episodic phenomena that are common in Parkinsonian gait. Falls and freezing of gait in PD are generally thought to be closely intertwined for several reasons, most importantly: both symptoms are common in the advanced stages of the disease and are less common in the earlier stages, with freezing of gait leading to falls in many instances. Both symptoms often respond poorly and sometimes paradoxically to treatment with dopaminergic medication, perhaps pointing to a common underlying pathophysiology. It is possible to demonstrate poor and paradoxical dopaminergic medication response through a challenge paradigm in which gait is assessed after withdrawal from medication and in the full ON medication state.

Freezing of Gait: Freezing of Gait (FOG) is typically a transient episode – lasting less than a minute, in which gait is halted and the patient complains that his/her feet are glued to the ground. When the patient overcomes the block, walking can be performed relatively smoothly. The pathophysiology of the phenomenon is poorly understood but likely extends across a disseminated functional-anatomic network. Current treatments for FOG offer only limited benefits but a range of novel approaches are being actively explored, and thought is being given to how future research strategies are best coordinated.

The most common form of FOG is 'start hesitation' (which happens when the patient wants to start walking) followed in frequency by 'turning hesitation' FOG can also be experienced in narrow or tight quarters such as a doorway, whilst adjusting one's steps when reaching a destination, and in stressful situations such as when the telephone or the doorbell rings or when the elevator door opens. As the disease progresses, FOG can appear spontaneously even in an open runway space.

Falls: Falls, like FOG are rare in the earlier stages of the disorder and becomes more frequent as the disease progresses. Falls result mainly due to sudden changes in posture, in particular turning movements of the trunk, or attempts to perform more than one activity simultaneously with walking or balancing. Falls are also common during transfers, such as rising from a chair or bed. PD patients fall mostly forward (45% of all falls) and about 20% fall laterally. Falls that occur frequently very early in the disease course may signify that another diagnosis (such as progressive supranuclear palsy) should be considered.

=== Postural sway ===
Postural instability in upright stance is common in end-stage PD and compromises the ability to maintain balance during everyday tasks such as walking, turning and standing up from sitting. An inability to adequately balance the body's center of mass over the base of support combined with inflexibility in body movements (due to increased rigidity) causes patients with advanced PD to fall. Whereas postural sway in normal stance usually increases in patients with balance disorders arising from stroke, head injury and cerebellar ataxia it is often reduced in patients with PD. This is because in PD, the problem appears to be a lack of flexibility in shifting postural responses. This inflexibility increases the tendency to fall in these patients.

=== Electromyographic studies ===
Electromyographic (EMG) studies of the leg muscles in PD patients have shown an extreme reduction in the activation of the tibialis anterior muscle in the early stance and in the early and late swing phases, and a reduction in triceps surae muscle bursting at push-off. The quadriceps and hamstring muscles on the other hand, show prolonged activation in the stance phase of gait. This implies that PD patients have higher passive stiffness of ankle joints, show larger background EMG activity and more co-contraction of leg muscles in stance. Stiffer joints lead to abnormal postural sway in the PD patients.

== Digital gait analysis in parkinsonian gait ==
Digital gait analysis has emerged as a transformative approach for objectively assessing gait disturbances in PD, providing quantitative data that surpasses traditional clinical observation. The two most important methods are sensor-based and video-based technologies. Sensor-based systems, such as wearable inertial measurement units (IMUs) and pressure-sensitive insoles, are typically attached to the lower limbs, trunk, or shoes. These devices capture spatiotemporal and kinematic parameters—including stride length, gait speed, cadence, step and swing times, and gait variability—with high accuracy and reliability in both clinical and real-world settings. Video-based methods utilize markerless motion capture and advanced computer vision algorithms to extract joint positions and limb trajectories from standard or depth camera recordings. Recent advances in deep learning have enabled these systems to accurately quantify gait features and upper body movements, making them suitable for both laboratory and home environments.

Key gait patterns observed in PD through digital analysis include reduced gait speed and stride length, increased cadence and double support time, greater step-to-step variability, and diminished arm swing. As the disease progresses, shuffling, festination, and freezing of gait episodes become more prominent. Early markers such as increased step time variability and asymmetry can be sensitively detected with digital tools, while advanced stages reveal more pronounced reductions in trunk and limb range of motion.

Clinically, digital gait analysis supports early diagnosis by identifying subtle abnormalities before they are evident in routine examination, and aids differential diagnosis by distinguishing PD from other movement disorders based on unique gait signatures. It enables objective and precise monitoring of disease progression, as longitudinal changes in digital gait biomarkers correlate with clinical decline, thereby allowing optimized clinical trial designs with lower number of patients. Specific gait patterns are associated with an increased risk of faster disease progression and higher mortality. Furthermore, integrating digital gait data with clinical and other biological information enhances the prediction of clinical symptoms, disease progression and prognosis.

== Gait improvement strategies ==
=== Drugs ===
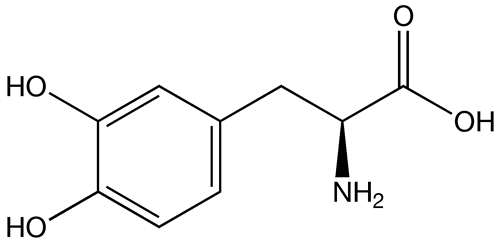
L-dopa (activates D1 receptor), the most widely used drug for Parkinson's treatment

The most widely used form of treatment is L-dopa in various forms. L-dopa is able to pass the blood–brain barrier as a prodrug and is decarboxylated in the brain to the neurotransmitter dopamine by the enzyme aromatic-L-amino-acid decarboxylase. In this way, L-DOPA can replace some of the deficit in dopamine seen in Parkinsonism. Due to feedback inhibition, L-dopa results in a reduction in the endogenous formation of L-dopa, and so eventually becomes counterproductive.

Effect on gait parameters: The stride length and the kinematic parameters (swing velocity, peak velocity) related to the energy are Dopa-sensitive. Temporal parameters (stride and swing duration, stride duration variability), related to rhythm, are Dopa-resistant.

Effect on falls and freezing of gait: Levodopa treatment decreases the frequency and the akinetic type of FOG, with a tendency for shorter FOG episodes. Results indicate that this is primarily because L-dopa increases the threshold for FOG to occur but the fundamental pathophysiology for FOG did not change. It has also been shown that other dopamine agonists like ropinirole, pramipexole and pergolide that have a strong affinity to D2 receptors (as opposed to L-dopa which has a strong D1 receptor affinity) increase the frequency of FOGs.

Effects on postural sway: Parkinson's disease have abnormal postural sway in stance and treatment with levodopa increases postural sway abnormalities. During movement, it has been shown that early autonomic postural disturbances are only partially corrected while the later occurring postural corrections are not affected by dopamine. These results indicate that non-dopaminergic lesions play a role in postural imbalance in PD patients.

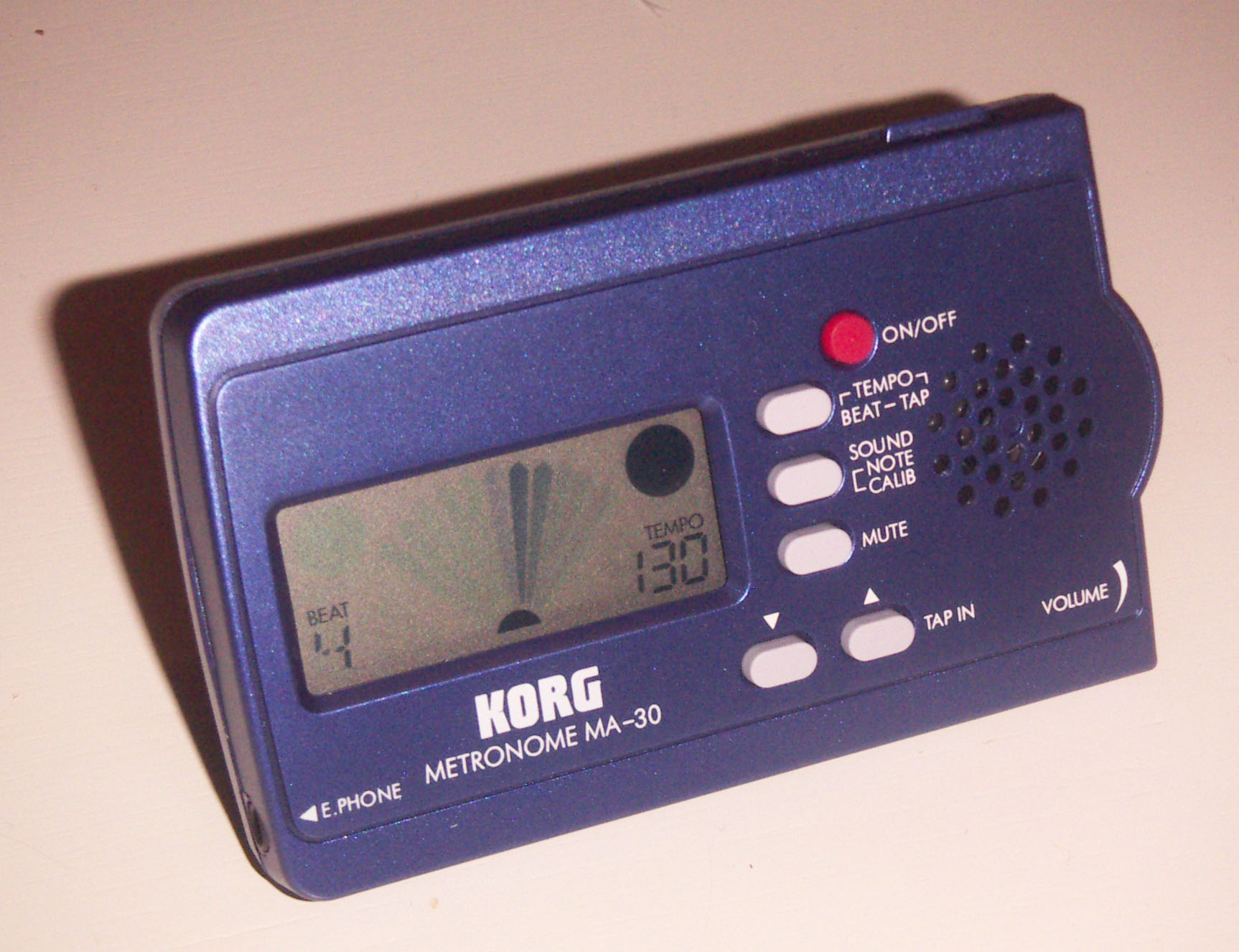
Metronome used to deliver rhythmic auditory cues for Parkinsons disease patients

Metronome sound used as auditory cues

=== Auditory and visual cues ===
Basal ganglia dysfunction in PD causes it to stop acting as an internal cue for gait in Parkinson's patients. Hence various external sensory cues like auditory and visual cues have been developed to bypass the basal ganglia's cueing functions.

Visual cues: The visual cues are commonly transverse lines or rods on the floor (floor markers). Such cues have been shown to improve stride length and velocity in Parkinsonian gait by substituting kinaesthetic feedback with visual feedback for regulating movement amplitude. In addition gait initiation has been shown to be significantly improved in PD patients compared with auditory cues. Visual cues administered by "laser canes" have been reported to improve gait initiation. Virtual reality glasses have also been developed recently to aid walking in PD patients.

Auditory cues: The auditory cues are commonly rhythmic cues generated by a metronome or equivalent, sometimes embedded in music, set at or slightly above the subject's usual cadence. Rhythmic auditory cues have been associated with increases in velocity and cadence and sometimes stride after gait has been initiated. Auditory cues have been shown to have little or no effect in gait initiation. Moreover, there are prediction algorithms to support more efficient auditory cueing. These algorithms predict freezing episodes so that a cueing can be initiated.

=== Deep brain stimulation ===
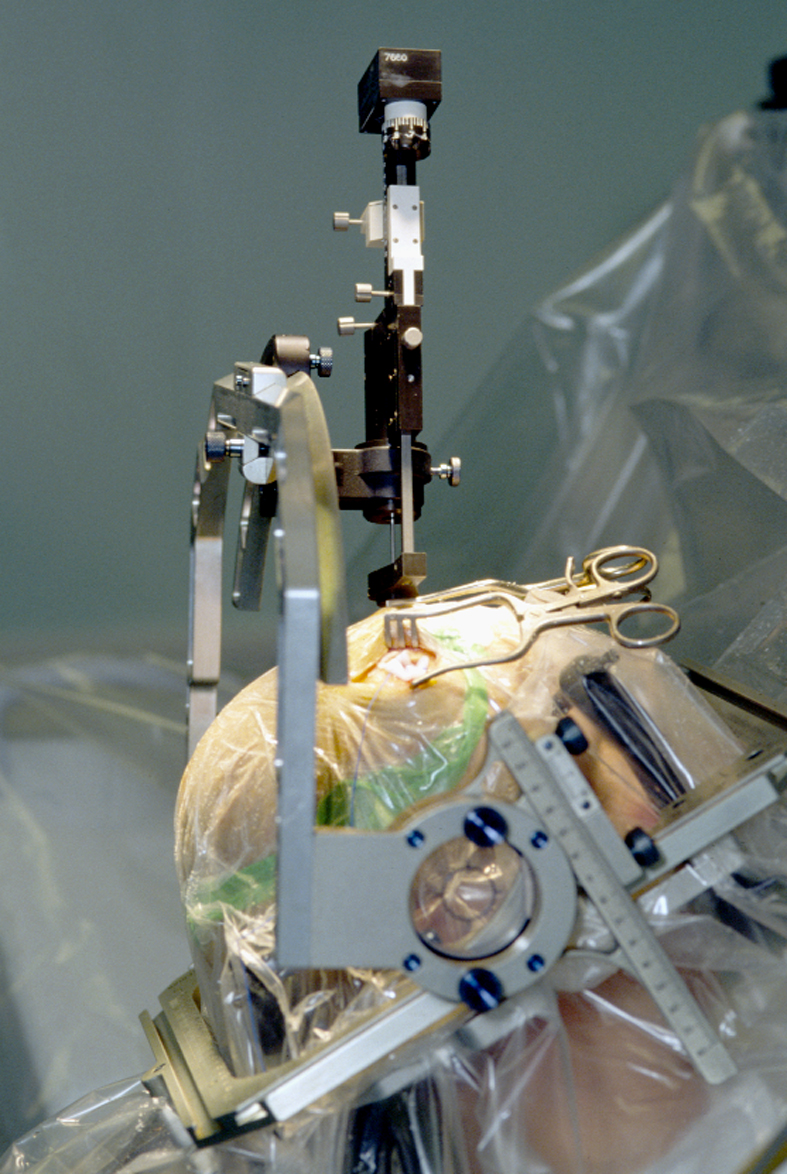
Deep Brain Stimulation on a Parkinson's patient. The picture shows the process of implantation of a DBS electrode into a patient's brain.

Deep brain stimulation (DBS) in the pedunculopontine nucleus, a part of the brainstem involved in motor planning, has been shown to improve gait function in patients with Parkinson's disease.

DBS in the subthalamic nucleus (STN) and the globus pallidus have also been shown to have positive effects on gait abnormalities presented by Parkinson's Disease patients. DBS in the STN has been reported to reduce freezing of gait significantly at 1 and 2 year follow up. Contradictory results have been reported on the effects on DBS on postural stability The results seem to be highly location specific. The studies which do report positive effects suggest that the effectiveness of DBS in improving postural stability is due to its ability to affect non-dopaminergic pathways (in addition to dopaminergic pathways) which are believed to cause postural sway in PD patients. Several studies suggest that STN stimulation with low frequencies (60–80 Hz) better alleviates gait deficits than with the commonly used high frequencies (>130 Hz).

=== Other treatments strategies ===
Attention strategies: By consciously paying more attention to walking and rehearsing each step before actually making it, PD patients have shown to improve their gait. Sometimes, a companion walking alongside reminds the patient to concentrate on gait or they create a visual cue to step over by putting a foot in front of the person with PD over which the person must step. This causes the patient to focus their attention on the stepping action, thus making this a voluntary action and hence bypassing the faulty basal ganglia pathway (which is responsible for involuntary actions like walking). Avoidance of dual tasks that require motor attention or cognitive attention has also been shown to normalize gait in the PD patients.

Exercise: Physical therapy and exercise have been shown to have positive effects on gait parameters in PD patients.

Physiotherapists may help improve gait by creating training programs to lengthen a patient's stride length, broaden the base of support, improve the heel-toe gait pattern, straighten out a patient's posture, and increase arm swing patterns.

Research has shown gait training combining an overhead harness with walking on a treadmill has shown to improve both walking speed and stride length. The harness assists the patient in maintaining an upright posture by eliminating the need to use a mobility aid, a practice which normally promotes a forward flexed posture. It is believed the activation of the central pattern generator leads to the improvement in gait pattern.

Improving trunk flexibility, along with strengthening of the core muscles and lower extremities has been associated with increased balance and an improvement in gait pattern. Aerobic exercises such as tandem bicycling and water aerobics are also crucial in improving strength and overall balance. Due to PD's progressive nature it is important to sustain an exercise routine to maintain its benefits.

Strategies such as using a vertical walking pole can also help to improve upright postural alignment. The therapist may also use tiles or footprints on the ground to improve foot placement and widen the patient's base of support. Creative visualization of walking with a more normalized gait pattern, and mentally rehearsing the desired movement has also shown to be effective.

The patient should also be challenged by walking on a variety of surfaces such as tile, carpet, grass, or foamed surfaces will also benefit the individual's progress towards normalizing their gait pattern.

== Comparison with other gait disorders ==
Subcortical arteriosclerotic encephalopathy (SAE), also called lower-body parkinsonism, and cerebellar ataxia are two other gait disorders whose symptoms seem to closely resemble that of Parkinson's. However, through regression analysis studies have revealed that in Parkinson's, increasing the velocity of walking changes the stride length linearly (which resembles that of controls). However, in SAE and cerebellar ataxia stride length had a disproportionate contribution to increasing velocity, indicating that SAE and cerebellar ataxia have common underlying mechanisms different from those of Parkinson's.

== Socio-economic impact ==
Mobility issues associated with falls and freezing of gait have a devastating impact in the lives of PD patients. Fear of falling in itself can have an incapacitating effect in PD patients and can result in social seclusion leaving patients largely isolated leading to depression. Immobility can also lead to osteoporosis which in-turn facilitates future fracture development. This then becomes a vicious circle with falls leading to immobility and immobility facilitating future falls. Hip fractures from falls are the most common form of fracture among PD patients. Fractures increase treatment costs associated with health care expenditures in PD. Also, when gait is affected it often heralds the onset of Lewy body dementia.
