= Der Philosophische Arzt =

Der Philosophische Arzt is a medical publication published in the late 18th century by Melchior Adam Weikard, a prominent German physician and philosopher to the Russian Empress, Catherine II.

The first edition of Der Philosophische Arzt was first published in 1775, but was written perhaps as early as 1770. It was initially published anonymously as was the second edition, though it was widely believed that Weikard was the author. The reason for doing so is unclear but was probably due to anticipated critical reactions to its publication from several sources. A principal one was the Prince-Bishop of Fulda, to whom Weikard served as physician and in a Catholic region where Weikard worked as a spa doctor being supported by the state. According to Otto Schmitt's biography of Weikard published in 1970, the reaction of organized religion to the publication of his textbook was widespread condemnation. This was likely due to his attacks in the textbook on various religious practices for curing medical illnesses. According to Schmidt, the attacks against Weikard continued throughout his career but his patron, Prince Heinrich von Bibra, maintained an amicable relationship with him and supported him financially late in his career despite many people who criticized the Prince for doing so.
