= Melchior Adam Weikard =

German physician (1742–1803)

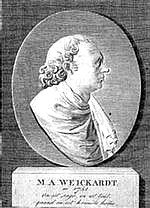
Melchior Adam Weikard.jpg

Melchior Adam Weikard was born on April 27, 1742, near Fulda Germany. He was a physician and a philosopher. Weikard wrote the earliest reference to the behavioral disorder attention deficit hyperactivity disorder (ADHD). He was progressive for his time, believing that illnesses have physical causes and that they are not a result of moral wrongs or the spiritual influences. Weikard died near his birthplace on July 25, 1803.

== Early life ==
Weikard grew up around Fulda and, at the age of six, developed a spinal deformity. In secondary school, at the Frobenius-Gymnasium in Hammelburg, Weikard studied in the modern-day equivalent of the STEM program. Weikard then went on to study physics, philosophy, and medicine at the University of Würzburg. He did not have kind things to say about his education. Weikard was nearsighted, physically deformed, and missed two years of school which made his experience arduous. Weikard claimed to have teachers who taught out of date material in secondary school and at university claimed to have bad teaching from the professors. It was also said that because he studied at Würzburg his ability was doubted since it was a smaller less prestigious school. Later in his life, Weikard argued for getting rid of small Catholic universities, like the one he studied at, which did not have the funding for good teachers. He instead recommended sending talented boys farther away to better schools in bigger cities that had the proper resources.

== Adult life ==
Despite his reported lack of proficient teachers, he succeeded in his career. In 1763, Weikard became a physician in Fulda and in 1764, he worked at the government-run resort spa in the office of Bruckenau until 1776. In 1770, Weikard became the physician to Prince-Bishop Heinrich von Bibra. During this time, he also earned the rank of Professor of Medicine at the University of Fulda.

Weikard was quite the rebel in his adult life. He lived in a Catholic territory but seems to have been indifferent to the church's teachings. Weikard believed in a God, but he criticized the idea that demons and witches caused ills and evil. Instead he believed in physical causes of illnesses. He also criticized philosophers’ attempts to reconcile materialism with Christianity. He challenged the assumption of a soul and, in a last act of defiance, refused sacraments on his deathbed. One of the consequences of him not believing in a soul or immaterial influence was he argued that all cognitive functioning depends on the physical state of the brain. He not only acknowledged physical factors, but also climate and education as factors affecting cognitive capabilities. At the time the belief that the presence of a good or evil star during conception or birth would determine personality was common. Since he believed the brain controlled a person he did not believe in or condone astrology. Weikard also valued evidence and objectivity more than what was usual of his time and he was not afraid of confrontation with medical and theological adversaries.

In 1790, the third edition of Der Philosophische Arzt [The Philosophical Doctor] by Melchior Adam Weikard was published. The first edition was published in 1775 and there was a second edition as well. The first and second editions of the textbook were published anonymously. Although, back then and now, many believe that Weikard wrote them. Anonymously writing the book may have been a good idea since the book was not well received. Weikard's reputation sank and it was recorded that his friends were fearful of the public backlash to being seen with him.

The church condemned the book for criticizing its remedies [evidence for this?]. Journal articles of the time were particularly harsh towards the book. Though the backlash was sharp, it did not seem to matter all that much because the book had enough success to have at least one more edition published. Through all the public outrage, Weikard's patron, Prince Heinrich von Bibra remained supportive. Many were not happy with this outcome, so the prince issued a decree prohibiting the textbook. Though he did not punish Weikard directly and even went on to financially support his retirement.

He continued to have success in his career as well. Weikard was the Physician-in-ordinary at the Russian court for Catharine II in 1784. While there, he was appointed to State Council and served in the position until he left of his own accord in 1789. In 1791 he became the personal physician of Prince-Bishop Karl Theodor von Dalberg of Mainz but stopped shortly after in 1792. Weikard then went to Mannheim to practice medicine, and two years later moved to Heilbronn. After that, he became the Imperial Chief Physician to Tsar Paul in Russia. He then retired to his home and became a Privy Councilor, Director of the Medical Institutes.

=== Der Philosophische Arzt [The Philosophical Doctor] ===
In Weikard's book, he describes a “lack of attention” disorder commonly known as attention deficit hyperactivity disorder or ADHD. He provides many details that closely match the disorder we currently know, and many of Weikard's observations hold up to modern scrutiny. Weikard characterizes the disorder as distractible by anything even a person's own imagination, taking more effort to complete tasks, flighty, careless, work has many errors, and generally disorganized. He hints at impulsivity though he does not explicitly say it. This matches the DSM-V's diagnostic criteria of inattention and hints at the hyperactivity and impulsivity criteria.

Weikard attributes the problem to “the fibers too soft or too agile and can also cause the fact that they lack the necessary strength for the constant attention.” He blamed upbringing for the lack of ability of the “fibers”. This incorrect idea of upbringing causing the disorder persisted well into the 1970s and some still believe that it is the cause today. Weikard also gives cures for this disorder. He recommends distractions to be removed, though he goes a step farther in saying being left alone in a dark room will help. This is not an ethical practice and is not recommended. He also recommends “rubbing, cold baths, steel powder, cinchona, mineral waters, horseback riding, and gymnastic exercises” along with making sure the individual learns a topic thoroughly and in a way that is interesting to them before they move on to other topics. The majority of these cures are rubbish but removing distractions and exercising are currently used to temporarily lessen symptoms and increase productivity.

Weikard also makes the correct observation that this disorder was more prevalent in children than adults. He noted that women are less attentive than men which is incorrect and was colored by the ideas of the day.

== Impact ==
After Weikard, the Scottish physician Sir Alexander Crichton wrote about ADHD in 1798. Crichton was the first person to publish a textbook only on mental diseases and he went on to write a second book on the topic. Crichton's disease of attention is also extremely consistent with today's definition. For a long time, it was recorded that Crichton had the earliest reference to ADHD. This could be attributed to the lack of translations of Weikard's work into English or simply modern scholars did not look closely at his work. Then in 2012 Barkley and Peters wrote their article about Weikard and his diagnosis. They had heard a story of a medical book that referenced a condition similar to ADHD that was written before Crichton's. They found an original copy of Weikard's book and translated it. You may note that Weikard's and Crichton's disorders are similar and only 23 years apart in publication. Barkley and Peters suggest that Crichton might have met and known Weikard since Crichton studied in cities where Weikard lived and taught. Though Crichton gives no reference to Weikard in his own texts. We now, of course, give credit to Weikard on writing the earliest reference to ADHD.
