= Eliezer Masliah =

Science fraudster

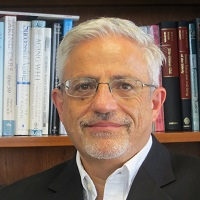
Masliah in 2016

Eliezer Masliah (born 1958 or 1959) is a neuropathologist who was the director of the division of neuroscience at the National Institute on Aging from 2016 to 2024. In September 2024, an investigation exposed image manipulation across 132 of Masliah's research papers, raising concerns about data integrity in studies influencing Alzheimer's and Parkinson's disease treatments, pharmaceutical patents, and clinical trials. As of November 2026 he has had 32 retractions.

== Background ==
He received his medical degree in 1982 from the National Autonomous University of Mexico. After postdoctoral training at University of California, San Diego (UCSD) he became a tenure-track professor at UCSD's Department of Neuroscience, with a joint appointment in Pathology. He also directed the neuropathology core of the Shirley-Marcos Alzheimer's Disease Research Center at UCSD. He was appointed head of the U.S. National Institute on Aging's Division of Neuroscience in 2016.

He has a prolific body of work — over 800 research papers, much of which is now under scrutiny for containing manipulated images to support different conclusions than the real data. In September 2024, the NIH released a statement that stated he was no longer serving in the role of Director of the Division of Neuroscience.

== Research misconduct ==
In September 2024, Masliah's work came under intense scrutiny when an investigation led by the journal Science exposed extensive image manipulation across 132 of his published research papers. A 286-page dossier compiled by forensic analysts and neuroscientists pointed to repeated instances of Western blot manipulation, image reuse, and other forms of digital editing across decades of his research. These allegations involved crucial studies related to Alzheimer's and Parkinson's disease, particularly surrounding the alpha-synuclein protein.

The dossier was sent to the HHS Office of Research Integrity, which requested that the National Institute on Aging (NIA) start a research misconduct investigation in May 2023. The NIA started their investigation in December 2023. In September 2024, the NIH confirmed that Masliah was no longer leading the Division of Neuroscience at the NIA, following the conclusion of their investigation.

The controversy includes papers that have influenced clinical trials and investment decisions in the pharmaceutical industry. 238 active patents cite papers by Masliah that contain anomalous images and data. A notable impact on the pharmaceutical industry concerns the experimental Parkinson's drug prasinezumab, developed by Prothena Biosciences in collaboration with Roche. A Phase II study reported in August 2022 found no statistically significant effect from the drug vs placebo on measures of Parkinson's disease progression. Several papers foundational to the development of prasinezumab were flagged for image manipulation. According to Google patent search, Masliah's name appears on 28 patents, including several patents filed by Prothena Biosciences, as well as earlier patents filed in conjunction with UCSD for drugs that target synucleopathies.

Research trials on the drugs cerebrolysin and minzasolmin were also found to be based on questionable data from Masliah's lab. Masliah co-authored 21 papers on the pig brain extract cerebrolysin, eight of which have been discovered to have issues. Cerebrolysin is marketed as containing "neurotrophic peptides" but researchers using high performance liquid chromatography found that it does not contain peptides, and is largely composed of amino acids and salt, with some trace protein fragments. Some of the fraudulent papers on cerebrolysin co-authored by Masliah appear to have been quite influential in boosting interest in cerebrolysin, which is used today in countries like Russia to treat stroke, dementia, and other conditions. Masliah received funding for many of his cerebrolysin studies from the maker of cerebrolysin, EVER Pharma, and collaborated with Herbert Moessler, former general manager at EVER Pharma, who incidentally has 19 of his own papers flagged for anomalies. Moessler and Masliah started a company, Neuropore, to investigate the drug minzasolmin in 2008. On December 16, 2024 UCB reported that a phase II clinical trial on minzasolmin involving 496 people showed that minzasolmin failed to demonstrate superiority over placebo in both primary and secondary endpoints.

Masliah has not publicly commented on any of the findings against him. As of November 2024 he is not listed as part of the National Institute on Aging's staff on their website, although in November 2024 his name still appeared in NIH's Network Enterprise Directory, suggesting he was still an NIH employee.
