= Amlenetug =

Clinical data
- Other names: Lu AF82422; LuAF82422
- Routes of administration: Intravenous infusion
- Drug class: Monoclonal antibody against α-synuclein

Identifiers
- CAS Number: 2850367-41-6
- PubChem SID: 472420424
- UNII: 52V6AS6U0A
- KEGG: D13126
- ChEMBL: ChEMBL4594571

Amlenetug (INN, USAN; developmental code name Lu AF82422) is a monoclonal antibody against α-synuclein which is under development for the treatment of multiple system atrophy. It is or was also under development for the treatment of Parkinson's disease, but no recent development has been reported. The drug is given by intravenous infusion. Amlenetug was originated by Genmab and Lundbeck A/S and is being developed by Lundbeck A/S. As of March 2025, it is in phase 3 clinical trials for multiple system atrophy.

== See also ==
- Anti-α-synuclein drug
- List of investigational Parkinson's disease drugs
