= C6orf62 =

Protein-coding gene in the species Homo sapiens

Identifiers
- Aliases: C6orf62, Nbla00237, XTP12, dJ30M3.2, chromosome 6 open reading frame 62
- External IDs: MGI: 2441726; HomoloGene: 11551; GeneCards: C6orf62; OMA:C6orf62 - orthologs

Gene location (Human)
Chr.	Chromosome 6 (human)
Band	6p22.3	Start	24,704,861 bp
Band	6p22.3	End	24,719,998 bp

Gene location (Mouse)
Chr.	Chromosome 13 (mouse)
Band	13|13 A3.1	Start	24,985,640 bp
Band	13|13 A3.1	End	25,000,180 bp
RNA expression pattern
Bgee	Human / Mouse (ortholog); Top expressed in: pylorus; monocyte; palpebral conjunctiva; testicle; germinal epithelium; superior vestibular nucleus; body of pancreas; cardia; lymph node; trigeminal ganglion / Top expressed in: Gonadal ridge; fetal liver hematopoietic progenitor cell; renal corpuscle; blood; ventricular zone; ciliary body; neural layer of retina; decidua; ganglionic eminence; tibiofemoral joint; More reference expression data
BioGPS	n/a
Gene ontology
Molecular function	molecular function
Cellular component	intracellular anatomical structure
Biological process	biological process
Sources:Amigo / QuickGO
Orthologs
Species	Human	Mouse
Entrez	81688	79555
Ensembl	ENSG00000112308	ENSMUSG00000019132
UniProt	Q9GZU0	Q99LU8
RefSeq (mRNA)	NM_030939	NM_024473
RefSeq (protein)	NP_112201	NP_077793
Location (UCSC)	Chr 6: 24.7 – 24.72 Mb	Chr 13: 24.99 – 25 Mb
PubMed search
- Wikidata
View/Edit Human	View/Edit Mouse

Chromosome 6 open reading frame 62 (C6orf62), also known as X-trans-activated protein 12 (XTP12), is a gene that encodes a protein of the same name. The encoded protein is predicted to have a subcellular location within the cytosol.

== Gene and Transcript ==
In the DNA, C6orf62 is 12,529 base pairs long and is located at 6q22.3. It is located on chromosome 6 on position 22.3 (6q22.3). The mature mRNA sequence is 2498 base-pairs long with 5 exons and 4 intronic regions that translates a protein that is 229 amino acids long and two predicted isoforms of 160 amino acids and 200 amino acids.

== Protein ==
The main transcript is 229 amino acids long and is encoded from 5 exonic regions. There exists two transcript variants that are 200 amino acids and 160 amino acids long. There is a domain of unknown function (DUF4566) present in all three variants and spans positions 1–226 on the main transcript. The molecular weight of C6orf62 is 27.1 kDa and its isoelectric point is at a pH of 9.24. It is located subcellularly localized throughout the cytosol.

=== Protein Interactions ===
Protein	
ELAVL1	predicted through affinity capture-RNA.
PVRL4	predicted through affinity capture-mass spectroscopy.
NADH	predicted through yeast two-hybrid screening.

== Expression ==
C6orf62 is broadly expressed within the human body, however, its protein abundance is not high. It is more heavily expressed in the gallbladder and testis, but it is not predicted to be expressed in the smooth muscle, lymph nodes, the spleen, ovaries, adipose tissue, and soft tissue.

== Homology ==
C6orf62 is highly conserved among vertebrates and has orthologs found in invertebrates.

=== Orthologs in Select Mammals ===
Genus	Species	Common name	Date of divergence (MYA)	RefSeq	AA Length	% Identity	% Similarity
Pongo	abelii	Sumatran Orangutan	15.2	NP_001126883.1	232	99	99
Ictidomys	tridecemlineatus	Ground Squirrel	88	XP_005337081.1	231	99	98
Tupaia	chinensis	Treeshrew	85	XP_006162754.1	267	84	98
Rattus	norvegicus	Brown Rat	88	NP_001017510.1	232	99	98

=== Orthologs in Select Ray-Finned Fish ===
Genus	Species	Common name	Date of divergence (MYA)	RefSeq	AA Length	% Identity	% Similarity
Salmo	salar	Salmon	435	XP_014034327.1	233	82	93
Sinocyclocheilus	rhinoceros	Golden-lined Barbell	435	XP_016388718.1	230	87	94
Hippocampus	comes	Seahorse	435	XP_019729847.1	234	80	91

=== Orthologs in Select Amphibians ===
Genus	Species	Common name	Date of divergence (MYA)	RefSeq	AA Length	% Identity	% Similarity
Nanorana	parkeri	High Himalaya Frog	353	XP_018411819.1	232	95	97
Xenopus	trpocalis	African Clawed Frog	353	NP_001120278.1	232	93	98

=== Orthologs in Select Reptiles ===
Genus	Species	Common name	Date of divergence (MYA)	RefSeq	AA Length	% Identity	% Similarity
Chrysemys	picta belli	Painted Turtle	320	XP_005281462.1	233	97	98
Python	vbivittatus	Burmese Python	320	XP_007521998.1	233	96	99
Chelonia	mydas	Green Sea Turtle	320	XP_007060449.1	231	97	98
Alligator	sinensis	Chinese Alligator	320	XP_006034488.1	232	98	99

=== Orthologs in Select Birds ===
Genus	Species	Common name	Date of divergence (MYA)	RefSeq	AA Length	% Identity	% Similarity
Tauraco	erythrolophus	Red-crested Tauraco	320	XP_009991398.1	232	97	
Taeniopygia	guttata	Zebra Finch	320	XP_002194166.1	232	98	
Manacus	vitellinus	Gold Marked Manakin	320	XP_017925511.1	241	98	

Orthologs in Select Invertebrates

Genus	Species	Common name	Date of divergence (MYA)	RefSeq	AA Length	% Identity	% Similarity
Ciona	intestinalis	Sea Squirt	677	XP_002119736.1	233	38	62
Crassostrea	gigas	Pacific Oyster	758	XP_011438527.1	231	62	80
Hellobdella	robusta	Glossiphoniidae Leech	758	XP_009016977.1	264	35	51
Octopus	bimaculoides	Two-Spot Octopus	758	XP_014780369.1	197	60	79
Saccoglossus	kowalevskii	Acorn Worm	627	XP_002741666.1	230	66	83
