= KH-3 =

KH-3 may refer to:

- CORONA (satellite)
- KH-3 (drug)
