= Beta-synuclein =

Protein-coding gene in the species Homo sapiens

SNCB

Identifiers
- Aliases: SNCB, entrez:6620, synuclein beta
- External IDs: OMIM: 602569; MGI: 1889011; GeneCards: SNCB

Gene location (Human)
Chr.	Chromosome 5 (human)
Band	5q35.2	Start	176,620,082 bp
Band	5q35.2	End	176,630,556 bp

Gene location (Mouse)
Chr.	Chromosome 13 (mouse)
Band	13 B1|13 29.28 cM	Start	54,906,673 bp
Band	13 B1|13 29.28 cM	End	54,914,408 bp
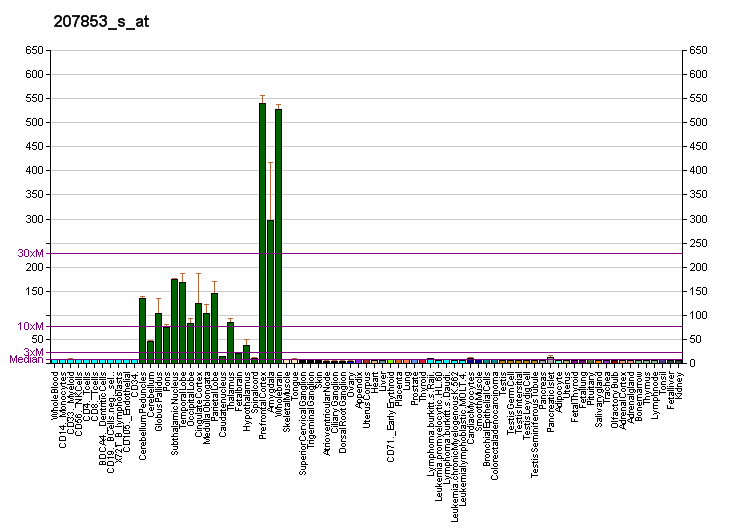
RNA expression pattern
Bgee	Human / Mouse (ortholog); Top expressed in: right hemisphere of cerebellum; right frontal lobe; Brodmann area 10; anterior cingulate cortex; dorsolateral prefrontal cortex; paraflocculus of cerebellum; Brodmann area 9; frontal pole; amygdala; hypothalamus / Top expressed in: dentate gyrus of hippocampal formation granule cell; neural layer of retina; primary visual cortex; superior frontal gyrus; perirhinal cortex; entorhinal cortex; CA3 field; cerebellar cortex; central gray substance of midbrain; superior colliculus; More reference expression data
BioGPS	More reference expression data
Gene ontology
Molecular function	phospholipase inhibitor activity; calcium ion binding; transition metal ion binding; cuprous ion binding
Cellular component	inclusion body; synapse; cytoplasm; cytosol; presynapse
Biological process	negative regulation of neuron apoptotic process; synapse organization; dopamine metabolic process; chemical synaptic transmission; negative regulation of catalytic activity; response to metal ion; synaptic vesicle endocytosis
Sources:Amigo / QuickGO
Orthologs
Databases	NCBI: entry; OMA: entry
Species	Human	Mouse
Entrez	6620	104069
Ensembl	ENSG00000074317	ENSMUSG00000034891
UniProt	Q16143	Q91ZZ3
RefSeq (mRNA)	NM_001001502; NM_003085; NM_001318034; NM_001318035; NM_001318036 NM_001318037; NM_001363140	NM_033610; NM_001362407
RefSeq (protein)	NP_001001502; NP_001304963; NP_001304964; NP_001304965; NP_001304966 NP_003076; NP_001350069	NP_291088; NP_001349336
Location (UCSC)	Chr 5: 176.62 – 176.63 Mb	Chr 13: 54.91 – 54.91 Mb
PubMed search
- Wikidata
View/Edit Human	View/Edit Mouse

Beta-synuclein is a protein that in humans is encoded by the SNCB gene.

The protein encoded by this gene is highly homologous to alpha-synuclein. These proteins are abundantly expressed in the brain and putatively inhibit phospholipase D2 selectively. The encoded protein, which may play a role in neuronal plasticity, is abundant in neurofibrillary lesions of patients with Alzheimer's disease. This protein has been shown to be highly expressed in the substantia nigra of the brain, a region of neuronal degeneration in patients with Parkinson's disease; however, no direct relation to Parkinson's disease has been established. Two transcript variants encoding the same protein have been found for this gene.

Beta-synuclein is a synuclein protein found primarily in brain tissue and is seen mainly in presynaptic terminals. Beta-synuclein is predominantly expressed in the neocortex, hippocampus, striatum, thalamus, and cerebellum. It is not found in Lewy bodies, but it is associated with hippocampal pathology in PD and DLB.

Beta-synuclein is suggested to be an inhibitor of alpha-synuclein aggregation, which occurs in neurodegenerative diseases such as Parkinson's disease. Thus, beta-synuclein may protect the central nervous system from the neurotoxic effects of alpha-synuclein and provide a novel treatment of neurodegenerative disorders.

== See also ==
- Synuclein
