= Cinpanemab =

Experimental monoclonal antibody

Monoclonal antibody
- Type: ?
- Target: α-Synuclein

Clinical data
- Other names: BIIB054; BIIB-054; NI-202; NI202

Identifiers
- CAS Number: 2094516-02-4
- DrugBank: DB16127
- UNII: W83JGQ40XX

Cinpanemab (INN, USAN; developmental code names BIIB054, NI-202) is an anti-α-synuclein drug acting as a monoclonal antibody against α-synuclein which was under development for the treatment of Parkinson's disease. It showed no significant influence on disease progression in a 52-week phase 2 clinical trial. The drug reached phase 2 clinical trials but was discontinued in 2021 due its lack of effectiveness. It was under development by Biogen.

== See also ==
- List of investigational Parkinson's disease drugs
- Prasinezumab
