= Anti-α-synuclein drug =

Drugs that inhibit α-synuclein

- Drug class

Class identifiers
- Synonyms: α-Synuclein inhibitor
- Mechanism of action: Block or inhibit α-synuclein
- Biological target: α-Synuclein
- Chemical class: Monoclonal antibodies; Vaccines; Others

Legal status

An anti-α-synuclein drug, or an α-synuclein inhibitor, is a drug which blocks or inhibits α-synuclein. α-Synuclein is a protein which is thought to be involved in the development and progression of α-synucleinopathies including Parkinson's disease, dementia with Lewy bodies, and multiple system atrophy. Anti-α-synuclein drugs are under development for treatment of Parkinson's disease and other α-synuclein-related diseases. Examples include the monoclonal antibodies prasinezumab and cinpanemab, which both failed to show effectiveness in slowing the progression of Parkinson's disease in phase 2 clinical trials. Other anti-α-synuclein drugs, like the monoclonal antibodies exidavnemab and amlenetug, the α-synuclein vaccines PD01A and PD03A, and the small-molecule α-synuclein misfolding and aggregation inhibitors minzasolmin and emrusolmin, are also under development. Memantine is also being studied as a potential disease-modifying treatment for Parkinson's disease by inhibiting cell-to-cell transmission of α-synuclein and is in a phase 3 trial for this purpose.

== See also ==
- Anti-amyloid antibodies
- Anti-tau drug
- List of investigational Parkinson's disease drugs
