= Olivopontocerebellar atrophy-deafness syndrome =

- Specialty: Medical genetics
- Complications: Hearing impairment, cerebellar ataxia
- Usual onset: Infancy
- Duration: Lifelong
- Causes: Genetic mutation
- Risk factors: Being of Omani ancestry
- Prevention: none
- Deaths: -

Olivopontocerebellar atrophy-deafness syndrome is a rare genetic disorder characterized by olivopontocerebellar atrophy which begins in infancy, sensorineural hearing loss, and speech delay. Additional findings include cerebellar ataxia. Inheritance pattern varies among families.

It has been described in 11 Omani children. The pedigrees of these children couldn't identify a solid mode of inheritance: 8 of the 11 children were suspected to be sporadic cases, while the pedigrees of 3 of the 11 children pointed to autosomal recessive inheritance.
