= SRI-42127 =

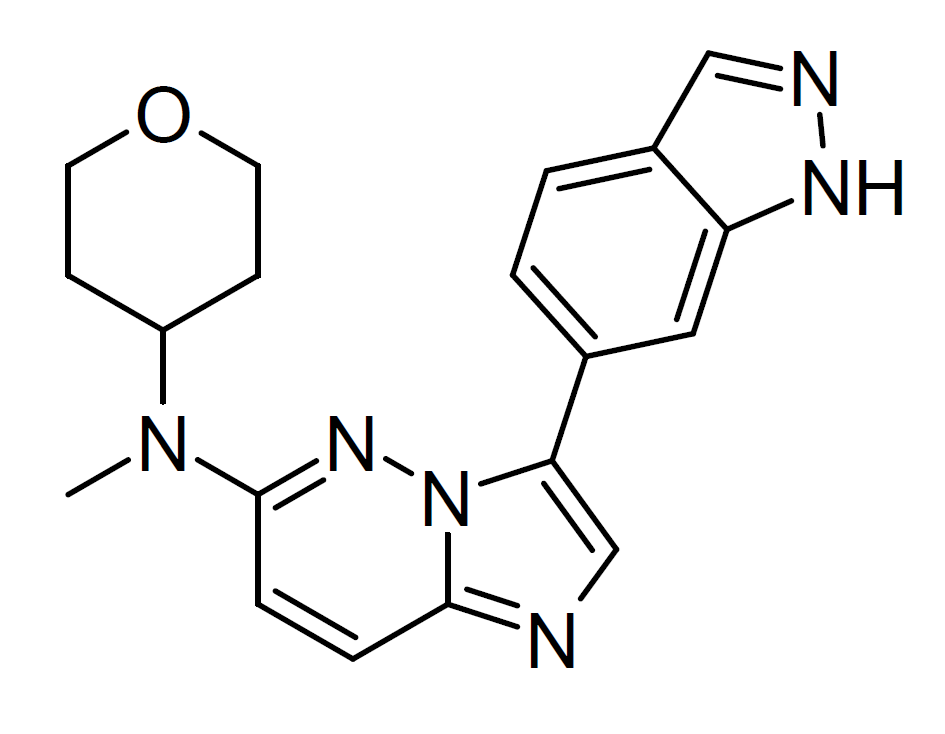

Identifiers
- IUPAC name: 3-(1H-indazol-6-yl)-N-methyl-N-(oxan-4-yl)imidazo[1,2-b]pyridazin-6-amine
- CAS Number: 2727872-68-4
- PubChem CID: 163415849
- ChemSpider: 128921334

Chemical and physical data
- Formula: C_{19}H_{20}N_{6}O
- Molar mass: 348.410 g·mol^{−1}
- 3D model (JSmol): Interactive image
- SMILES: CN(C1CCOCC1)C2=NN3C(=NC=C3C4=CC5=C(C=C4)C=NN5)C=C2
- InChI: InChI=1S/C19H20N6O/c1-24(15-6-8-26-9-7-15)19-5-4-18-20-12-17(25(18)23-19)13-2-3-14-11-21-22-16(14)10-13/h2-5,10-12,15H,6-9H2,1H3,(H,21,22); Key:AEHZEVSNZUVPNR-UHFFFAOYSA-N

SRI-42127 is an experimental drug which acts to inhibit translocation of the RNA-binding HuR protein. HuR translocation promotes the production of inflammatory cytokines in glial cells, and inhibiting HuR has applications both in the treatment of some forms of cancer, and also neuropathic pain.

== See also ==
- CMLD-2
- KH-3
