= Minzasolmin =

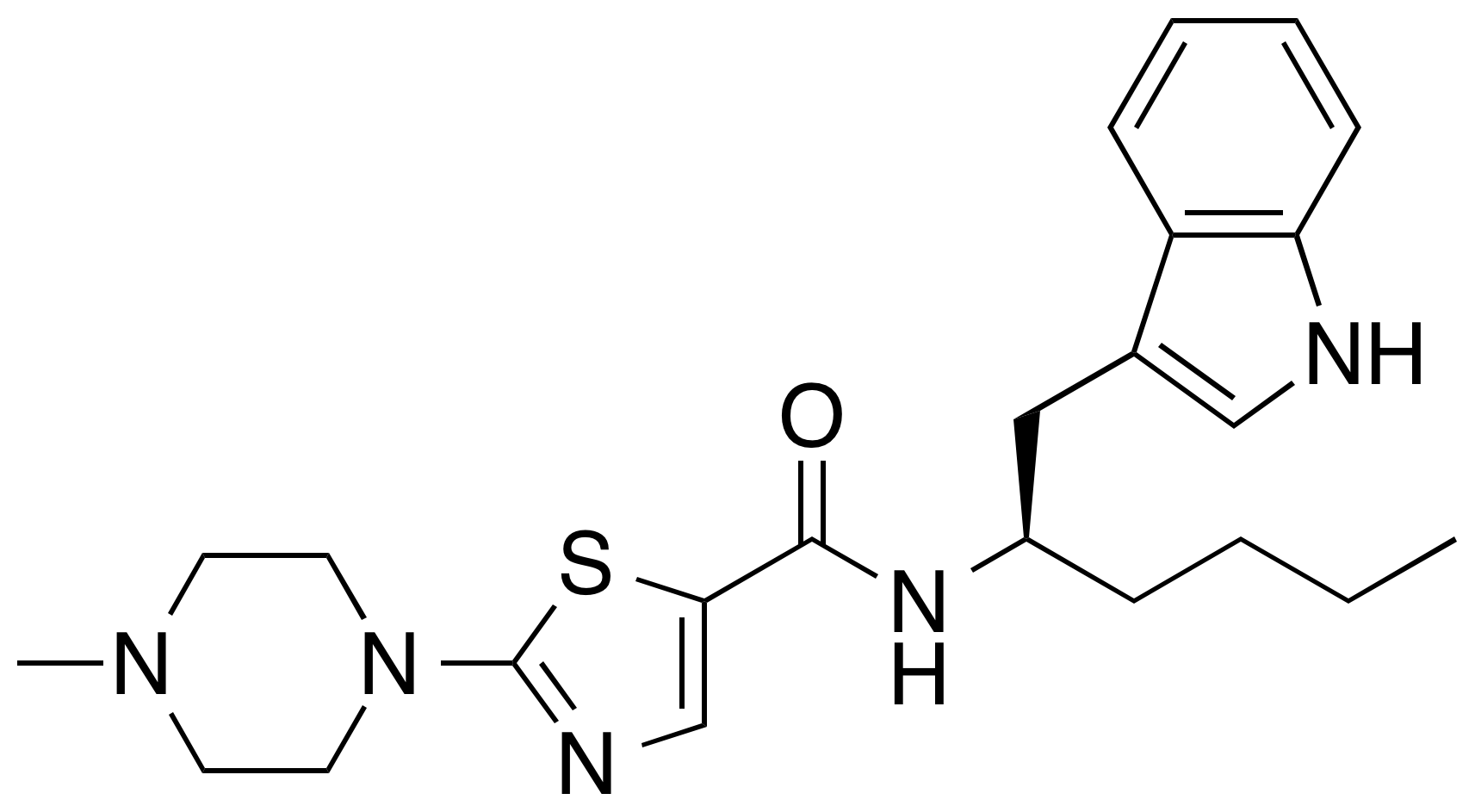

Names
- IUPAC name N-[(2R)-1-(1H-indol-3-yl)hexan-2-yl]-2-(4-methylpiperazin-1-yl)-1,3-thiazole-5-carboxamide

Identifiers
CAS Number	1802518-92-8
3D model (JSmol)	Interactive image
ChEMBL	ChEMBL5095072
ChemSpider	115010423
KEGG	D12796
PubChem CID	118279413
UNII	3N0435TG2D
- InChI: InChI=1S/C23H31N5OS/c1-3-4-7-18(14-17-15-24-20-9-6-5-8-19(17)20)26-22(29)21-16-25-23(30-21)28-12-10-27(2)11-13-28/h5-6,8-9,15-16,18,24H,3-4,7,10-14H2,1-2H3,(H,26,29)/t18-/m1/s1 Key: GDFWCSZNQVAQGR-GOSISDBHSA-N
- SMILES: CCCC[C@H](CC1=CNC2=CC=CC=C21)NC(=O)C3=CN=C(S3)N4CCN(CC4)C

Properties
Chemical formula	C_{23}H_{31}N_{5}OS
Molar mass	425.60 g·mol^{−1}
- Except where otherwise noted, data are given for materials in their standard state (at 25 °C [77 °F], 100 kPa). Infobox references

Minzasolmin (development names DLX313 and UCB0599) is an experimental small-molecule drug in development for Parkinson's disease that is designed to prevent misfolding of α-synuclein. On December 16, 2024 UCB reported the results of a phase II clinical trial on minzasolmin for Parkinson's involving 496 people, stating that the drug failed to demonstrate superiority over placebo in both primary and secondary endpoints.

== See also ==
- Anti-α-synuclein drug
- List of investigational Parkinson's disease drugs
