= Synuclein =

Identifiers
- Symbol: Synuclein
- Pfam: PF01387
- InterPro: IPR001058
- SCOP2: 1xq8 / SCOPe / SUPFAM
- OPM superfamily: 150
- OPM protein: 1xq8
Available protein structures:
- PDB: IPR001058 PF01387 (ECOD; PDBsum)
- AlphaFold: IPR001058; PF01387

Synucleins are a family of soluble proteins common to vertebrates, primarily expressed in neural tissue and in certain tumors.

The name is a blend of the words "synapse" and "nucleus", as it was first found in the synapses in the electromotor nucleus of the electric ray.

== Family members ==
The synuclein family includes three known proteins: alpha-synuclein, beta-synuclein, and gamma-synuclein. Interest in the synuclein family began when alpha-synuclein was found to be mutated in several families with autosomal dominant Parkinson's disease.

All synucleins have in common a highly conserved alpha-helical lipid-binding motif with similarity to the class-A2 lipid-binding domains of the exchangeable apolipoproteins. Synuclein family members are not found outside vertebrates, although they have some conserved structural similarity with plant 'late-embryo-abundant' proteins.

- Alpha-synuclein InterPro: IPR002460
- Beta-synuclein InterPro: IPR002461
- Gamma-synuclein InterPro: IPR002462

== Function ==
Normal cellular functions have not been determined for any of the synuclein proteins. Some data suggest a role in the regulation of membrane stability and/or turnover. Mutations in alpha-synuclein are associated with early-onset familial Parkinson's disease and the protein aggregates abnormally in Parkinson's disease, Lewy body disease, and other neurodegenerative diseases. The gamma-synuclein protein's expression in breast tumors is a marker for tumor progression.

== Human proteins containing this domain ==
SNCA; SNCB; SNCG;
