= ELAV-like protein 1 =

Protein found in humans

ELAVL1
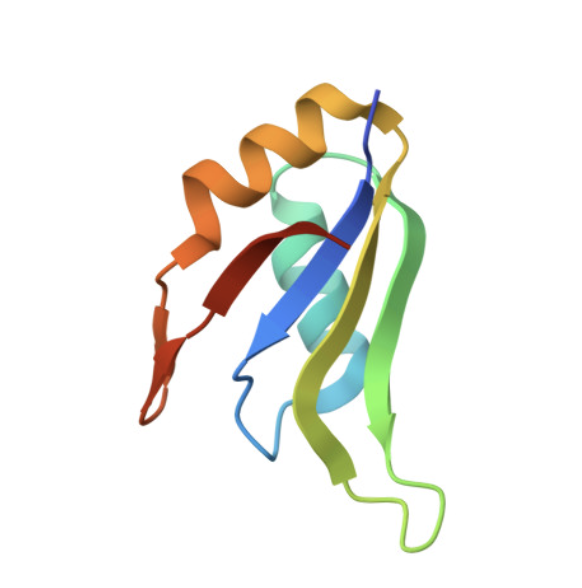

Identifiers
- Aliases: ELAVL1, ELAV1, HUR, Hua, MelG, ELAV like RNA binding protein 1, HuR
- External IDs: OMIM: 603466; MGI: 1100851; GeneCards: ELAVL1
Available structures
PDB	Ortholog search: PDBe RCSB
PDB	List of PDB id codes 3HI9, 4ED5, 4EGL, 4FXV

Gene location (Human)
Chr.	Chromosome 19 (human)
Band	19p13.2	Start	7,958,573 bp
Band	19p13.2	End	8,005,659 bp

Gene location (Mouse)
Chr.	Chromosome 8 (mouse)
Band	8 A1.1|8 2.0 cM	Start	4,335,382 bp
Band	8 A1.1|8 2.0 cM	End	4,375,413 bp
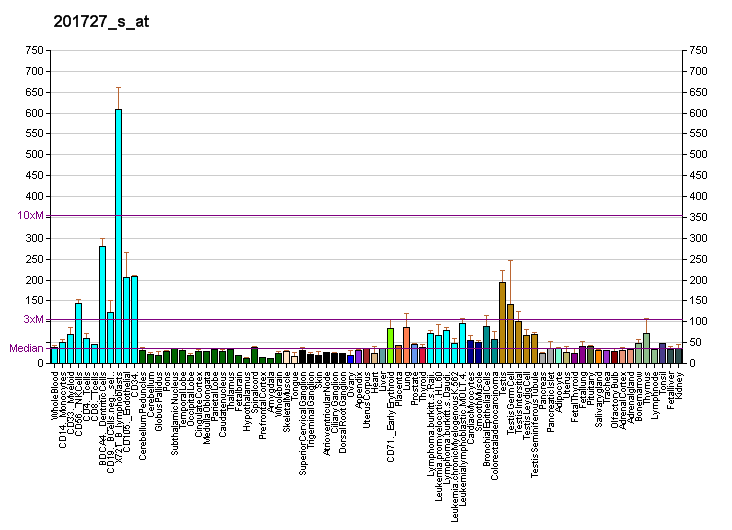

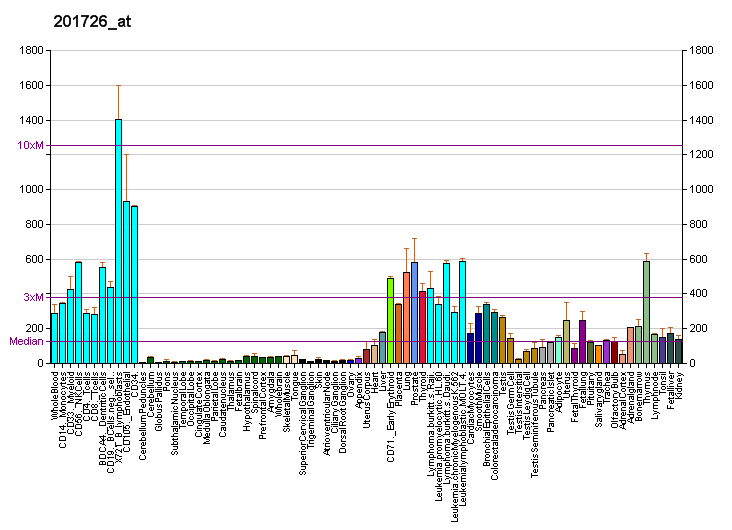
RNA expression pattern
Bgee	Human / Mouse (ortholog); Top expressed in: endothelial cell; secondary oocyte; pericardium; mucosa of sigmoid colon; ventricular zone; corpus epididymis; periodontal fiber; renal medulla; parotid gland; caput epididymis / Top expressed in: endocardial cushion; abdominal wall; mandibular prominence; maxillary prominence; somite; epiblast; atrioventricular valve; ventricular zone; molar; cumulus cell; More reference expression data
BioGPS	More reference expression data
Gene ontology
Molecular function	protein homodimerization activity; mRNA 3'-UTR binding; protein binding; RNA binding; nucleic acid binding; double-stranded RNA binding; protein kinase binding; mRNA binding; mRNA 3'-UTR AU-rich region binding; miRNA binding
Cellular component	cytoplasm; cytosol; membrane; nucleoplasm; nucleus; ribonucleoprotein complex; cytoplasmic stress granule; postsynapse; glutamatergic synapse
Biological process	regulation of mRNA stability; regulation of stem cell population maintenance; positive regulation of translation; multicellular organism development; mRNA stabilization; 3'-UTR-mediated mRNA stabilization; mRNA splicing, via spliceosome; negative regulation of gene silencing by miRNA; protein homooligomerization
Sources:Amigo / QuickGO
Orthologs
Databases	NCBI: entry; OMA: entry
Species	Human	Mouse
Entrez	1994	15568
Ensembl	ENSG00000066044	ENSMUSG00000040028
UniProt	Q15717	P70372
RefSeq (mRNA)	NM_001419	NM_010485
RefSeq (protein)	NP_001410	NP_034615
Location (UCSC)	Chr 19: 7.96 – 8.01 Mb	Chr 8: 4.34 – 4.38 Mb
PubMed search
- Wikidata
View/Edit Human	View/Edit Mouse

ELAV-like protein 1 or HuR (human antigen R) is a protein that in humans is encoded by the ELAVL1 gene.

The protein encoded by this gene is a member of the ELAVL protein family. This encoded protein contains 3 RNA-binding domains and binds cis-acting AU-rich elements in 3' untranslated regions. One of its best-known functions is to stabilize mRNAs in order to regulate gene expression. Various post-translational modifications of HuR influence its subcellular localization and stability of binding to mRNAs.

== Structure ==
Of the RNA-binding ELAV/Hu family of proteins in mammals, HuR is the only ubiquitously expressed one, whereas the other three are primarily found in neuronal tissue. Having a well-conserved primary structure to its family members, HuR has two adjacent RNA recognition motifs (RRMs) proximal to the N-terminus, followed by a flexible hinge region next to a final RRM at the C-terminus. The RRM domains of HuR each contain two alpha helices with several antiparallel beta sheets in their secondary structure, a 20 amino-acid long N-terminus before RRM1 and RRM2, and a 12 amino acid linker connecting them. The hinge region connecting RRM1,2 to RRM3 is 60 amino acids long.

=== RNA Binding ===
The RRM1 domain appears to be the principal RNA-binding portion with RRM2 contributing some more contacts. According to crystal structure studies, RRM1,2 domains correspond to a "moderately specific" predicted consensus sequence. Additionally, RRM3 contributes to dimerization and oligomerization of HuR, supporting binding to AU-rich elements of RNA by the other domains, but RRM3 itself has moderate binding strength to RNA. RRM3 has been shown to bind to long poly-A tails and AU-rich RNAs.

== Function ==
This RNA-binding protein has been found to be involved in a number of valuable cellular processes in mammals, including embryonic development, stress responses, and the immune system. Post-translational modifications of HuR, including phosphorylation, NEDDylation, methylation, and ubiquitination each modulate the localization and expression of the protein in unique ways. Modifications such as methylation and ubiquitination alter the affinity of HuR to RNA. As an important regulator of post-transcriptional regulation, HuR destabilization from the mRNA is associated with degradation of the transcript.

Phosphorylation of HuR can occur by cyclin-dependent kinases (cdks), impacting its localization within the cell in a cell cycle-dependent fashion. Additionally, checkpoint kinase 2 plays a significant role in phosphorylating HuR during genotoxic stress, promoting dissociation of HuR from its target mRNA transcript.

Additionally, the ubiquitination of HuR by an E3 ligase in many cases results in proteasomal degradation. For instance, the esophageal tumor suppressor ECRG2, ubiquitinates HuR during DNA damage, promoting its degradation. However, in other cases, ubiquitination promotes dissociation of HuR from its transcript, such as ubiquitination of certain lysine residues of the RRM3 domain leading to detachment from the mRNA transcript of P21 and other tumor suppressors.

Moreover, as is frequent in other mammalian proteins, HuR is methylated at arginine residues. For instance, protein arginine methyltransferase enzymes (PRMTs) methylate HuR to promote mRNA stabilization of certain target transcripts, such as SIRT1 in HeLa cells.

HuR has been shown to inhibit biogenesis of miR-7. Small molecules have been shown to target HuR/RNA interactions with a functional outcome on the downstream targets.

== Cancer ==
Although HuR has a vital role in transcriptosomal regulation, there is an apparent up-regulation of HuR in several types of cancer that correlates with a malignant or metastatic status that has increased the relevance of HuR as a potential therapeutic target for a number of cancer studies. The abundance of HuR suggests a tumorigenic promotion of angiogenesis, cellular proliferation, and anti-apoptotic properties in cancer cells, purportedly due to the impact of mRNA stabilization and its ubiquitous presence in human tissue.

== Inhibitors ==
- CMLD-2
- KH-3
- SRI-42127
