= Prasinezumab =

Experimental monoclonal antibody

Monoclonal antibody
- Type: ?
- Target: α-Synuclein

Clinical data
- Other names: NEOD002; NEOD-002; PRX002; PRX-002; RG7935; RG-7935; RO7046015; RO-7046015

Identifiers
- CAS Number: 1960462-19-4
- DrugBank: DB14788
- UNII: P3Z0Z3P1ZI

Prasinezumab (INN, USAN; developmental code names NEOD002, PRX-002, RG-7935, RO-7046015) is an anti-α-synuclein drug acting as a monoclonal antibody against α-synuclein which is under development for the treatment of Parkinson's disease. No significant effect on disease progression was seen in a 52-week phase 2 clinical trial. In any case, the trial was extended and development of the drug continues. There have been concerns about research misconduct and data fabrication relevant to prasinezumab. As of May 2024, prasinezumab is in phase 2 clinical trials for Parkinson's disease. It is under development by Prothena Biosciences and Roche.

== See also ==
- Cinpanemab
