= Gamma-synuclein =

Protein-coding gene in the species Homo sapiens

SNCG

Identifiers
- Aliases: SNCG, BCSG1, SR, synuclein gamma
- External IDs: OMIM: 602998; MGI: 1298397; GeneCards: SNCG

Gene location (Human)
| Chr. | Chromosome 10 (human) |
| Band | 10q23.2 | Start | 86,958,599 bp |
| Band | 10q23.2 | End | 86,963,258 bp |

Gene location (Mouse)
| Chr. | Chromosome 14 (mouse) |
| Band | 14 B|14 20.81 cM | Start | 34,092,231 bp |
| Band | 14 B|14 20.81 cM | End | 34,096,746 bp |
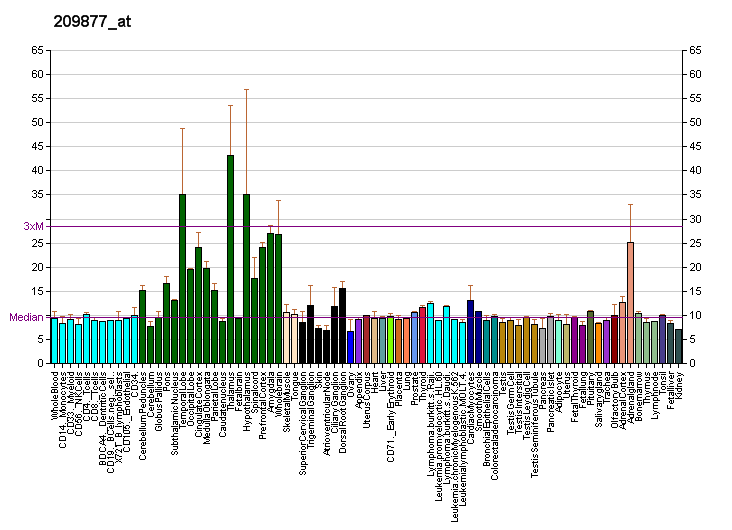
RNA expression pattern
| Bgee | Human / Mouse (ortholog); Top expressed in: right adrenal cortex; left adrenal cortex; popliteal artery; tibial arteries; right frontal lobe; amygdala; anterior cingulate cortex; left coronary artery; right coronary artery; lateral nuclear group of thalamus / Top expressed in: facial motor nucleus; white adipose tissue; lactiferous gland; spinal ganglia; superior cervical ganglion; anterior horn of spinal cord; neural layer of retina; sciatic nerve; trigeminal ganglion; lumbar spinal ganglion; More reference expression data |
| BioGPS | More reference expression data |
Gene ontology
| Molecular function | protein binding |
| Cellular component | cytoplasm; microtubule organizing center; perinuclear region of cytoplasm; axon; soma; spindle; extracellular exosome; cytoskeleton |
| Biological process | protein secretion; adult locomotory behavior; regulation of dopamine secretion; synapse organization; regulation of neurotransmitter secretion; chemical synaptic transmission |
Sources:Amigo / QuickGO
Orthologs
| Databases | NCBI: entry; OMA: entry |
| Species | Human | Mouse |
| Entrez | 6623 | 20618 |
| Ensembl | ENSG00000173267 | ENSMUSG00000023064 |
| UniProt | O76070 | Q9Z0F7 |
| RefSeq (mRNA) | NM_003087; NM_001330120 | NM_011430 |
| RefSeq (protein) | NP_001317049; NP_003078 | NP_035560 |
| Location (UCSC) | Chr 10: 86.96 – 86.96 Mb | Chr 14: 34.09 – 34.1 Mb |
| PubMed search |
- Wikidata
| View/Edit Human | View/Edit Mouse |

Gamma-synuclein is a protein that in humans is encoded by the SNCG gene.

Synuclein-gamma is a member of the synuclein family of proteins, which are believed to be involved in the pathogenesis of neurodegenerative diseases. High levels of SNCG have been identified in advanced breast carcinomas suggesting a correlation between overexpression of SNCG and breast tumor development. Gamma-synuclein is a synuclein protein found primarily in the peripheral nervous system (in primary sensory neurons, sympathetic neurons, and motor neurons) and retina. It is also detected in the brain, ovarian tumors, and in the olfactory epithelium. Gamma-synuclein is the least conserved of the synuclein proteins.

Gamma-Synucleins expression in breast tumors is a marker for tumor progression as mammalian gamma-synuclein was first identified as breast cancer-specific gene 1 (BCSG1). A change in the expression of gamma-synuclein has been observed in the retina of patients with Alzheimer's disease. The normal cellular function of gamma-synuclein remains unknown.

== Interactions ==
Gamma-synuclein has been shown to interact with BUB1B.

== See also ==
- Synuclein
