= CMLD-2 =

Identifiers
- IUPAC name: 5,7-dimethoxy-8-[1-(4-methoxyphenyl)-3-oxo-3-pyrrolidin-1-ylpropyl]-4-phenylchromen-2-one
- CAS Number: 958843-91-9
- PubChem CID: 16746438
- ChemSpider: 20577668
- ChEMBL: ChEMBL1499653

Chemical and physical data
- Formula: C_{31}H_{31}NO_{6}
- Molar mass: 513.590 g·mol^{−1}
- 3D model (JSmol): Interactive image
- SMILES: COC1=CC=C(C=C1)C(CC(=O)N2CCCC2)C3=C(C=C(C4=C3OC(=O)C=C4C5=CC=CC=C5)OC)OC
- InChI: InChI=1S/C31H31NO6/c1-35-22-13-11-21(12-14-22)23(17-27(33)32-15-7-8-16-32)29-25(36-2)19-26(37-3)30-24(18-28(34)38-31(29)30)20-9-5-4-6-10-20/h4-6,9-14,18-19,23H,7-8,15-17H2,1-3H3; Key:PROGRNRRJJYCNX-UHFFFAOYSA-N

CMLD-2 is an experimental drug which acts as an inhibitor of the RNA-binding HuR protein. Elevated levels of HuR are found in many forms of cancer, and CMLD-2 is being researched for potential applications in cancer treatment. It also has anti-inflammatory effects, and may also be useful for the treatment of neuropathic pain, as well as asthma, and Hepatitis B.

== See also ==
- KH-3
- SRI-42127
