= Synucleinopathy =

- Other names: α-synucleinopathies
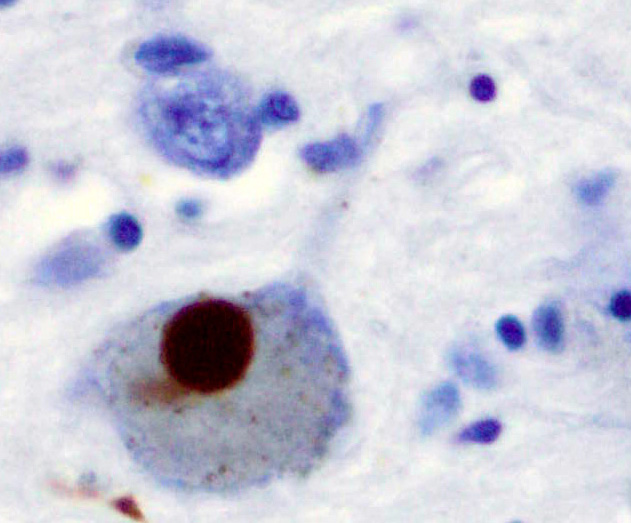
- Positive α-synuclein staining (brown) of a Lewy body in the substantia nigra of an individual with Parkinson's disease
- Specialty: Neurology
- Symptoms: Autonomic dysfunction, motor impairments, cognitive and sleep issues, parkinsonism, memory loss, hallucinations
- Duration: Long term
- Types: Parkinson's disease, dementia with Lewy bodies, multiple system atrophy
- Causes: Unknown

Synucleinopathies are neurodegenerative diseases characterised by the abnormal accumulation of aggregates of alpha-synuclein protein in neurons, nerve fibres or glial cells. The synucleinopathies include Parkinson's disease (PD), dementia with Lewy bodies (DLB), and multiple system atrophy (MSA). Other rare disorders, such as various neuroaxonal dystrophies, also have α-synuclein pathologies.

== Classification ==
The synucleinopathies include Parkinson's disease (PD), dementia with Lewy bodies (DLB), and multiple system atrophy (MSA). Other rare disorders, such as various neuroaxonal dystrophies, also have α-synuclein pathologies.

== Signs and symptoms ==
The synucleinopathies have shared features of parkinsonism, impaired cognition, sleep disorders, and visual hallucinations.

Synucleinopathies can overlap with tauopathies, possibly because of interaction between the synuclein and tau proteins.

REM sleep behavior disorder (RBD) is a parasomnia in which individuals with RBD lose the paralysis of muscles (atonia) that is normal during rapid eye movement (REM) sleep, and act out their dreams or have other abnormal movements or vocalizations. Abnormal sleep behaviors may appear decades before any other symptoms, often as an early sign of a synucleinopathy. On autopsy, 94 to 98% of individuals with polysomnography-confirmed RBD are found to have a synucleinopathy—most commonly DLB or PD. Other symptoms of the specific synucleinopathy usually manifest within 15 years of the diagnosis of RBD, but may emerge up to 50 years after RBD diagnosis.

Alpha-synuclein deposits can affect the cardiac muscle and blood vessels. Almost all people with synucleinopathies have cardiovascular dysfunction, although most are asymptomatic.

From chewing to defecation, alpha-synuclein deposits affect every level of gastrointestinal function. Symptoms include upper gastrointestinal tract dysfunction such as delayed gastric emptying or lower gastrointestinal dysfunction, such as constipation and prolonged stool transit time.

Urinary retention, waking at night to urinate, increased urinary frequency and urgency, and over- or underactive bladder are common in people with synucleinopathies. Sexual dysfunction usually appears early in synucleinopathies, and may include erectile dysfunction, and difficulties achieving orgasm or ejaculating.

== Mechanism ==
The pathological aggregation of alpha-synuclein plays a key role in neurodegenerative disease. The misfolding and aggregation of alpha-synuclein form toxic fibrils, which in turn form pathological inclusions, such as Lewy bodies. These protein deposits are a hallmark of synucleinopathies, and may interrupt crucial neuronal processes, such as functions of synaptic vesicles, leading to neuronal death. While PD and DLB are characterized by neuronal aggregates of alpha-synuclein, MSA is characterized by glial aggregates, featuring glial cytoplasmic inclusions rather than Lewy bodies.

Alpha-synuclein is encoded by the SNCA gene, and rare mutations in this gene can lead to dysfunctions of the protein structure. Post-translational modifications are also implicated in the aggregation of alpha-synuclein, mostly occurring in the C-terminus. Phosphorylation, acetylation, ubiquitination, oxidation, and other modifications alter the structure and charge of alpha-synuclein, which can in turn lead to the formation of Lewy bodies.

Alpha-synuclein has a prion-like molecular spread and is suggested to be released through rare exocytosis pathways. This release with exosomes on their way to degradation in lysosomes suggests this process may be calcium-dependent, and therefore suggests propagation of misfolded alpha-synuclein between neurons synaptically connected. Neuronal death caused by aggregated alpha-synuclein may also further accelerate the formation of these toxic aggregates, which can then trigger a selective progression of neuronal death through impairment of the mitochondria, alteration of calcium homeostasis, and lysosomal dysfunction.

Early synaptic and plastic alterations mediated by alpha-synuclein, as well as the mechanisms of inflammation and synaptic dysfunction that occurs before neurodegeneration, are of key interest for investigating possible therapies for synucleinpathies.

== Diagnosis ==
=== Differential diagnosis ===
Persons with PD are typically less caught up in their visual hallucinations than those with DLB. There is a lower incidence of tremor at rest in DLB than in PD, and signs of parkinsonism in DLB are more symmetrical. In MSA, autonomic dysfunction appears earlier and is more severe, and is accompanied by uncoordinated movements, while visual hallucinations and fluctuating cognition are less common than in DLB. Urinary difficulties are one of the earliest symptoms with MSA, and are often severe.

== Management ==
As of 2016, there are no medications that stop or improve the progression of synucleinopathies; treatments are limited to managing symptoms. Symptomatic therapies include medications for motor symptoms, treatments for autonomic dysfunction, and management of sleep or cognitive problems. Non-pharmacological approaches such as physical therapy, occupational therapy, and speech therapy are also commonly used.

Since alpha-synuclein is involved in the synucleinopathies, many potential disease-modifying treatments target this protein and its role in early inflammation and synaptic dysfunction.

== See also ==
- Proteopathy
- Anti-α-synuclein drug
