= KH-3 (drug) =

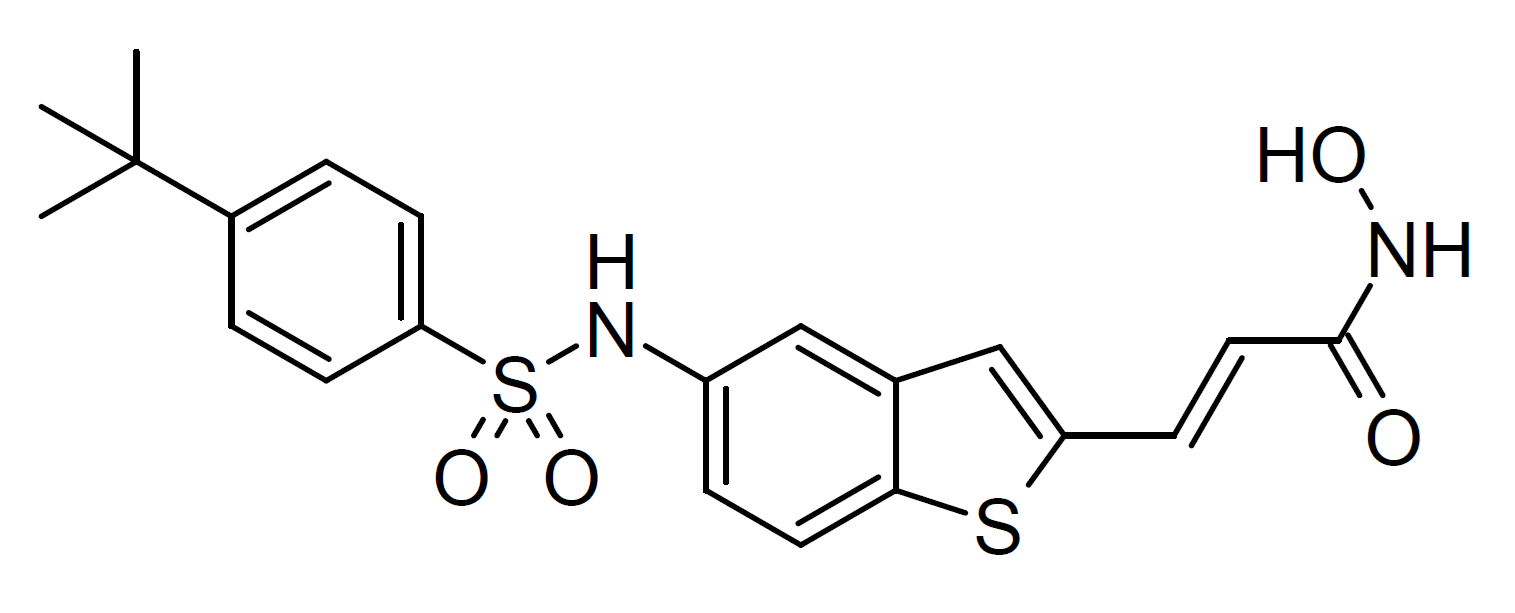

Identifiers
- IUPAC name: (E)-3-[5-[(4-tert-butylphenyl)sulfonylamino]-1-benzothiophen-2-yl]-N-hydroxyprop-2-enamide
- CAS Number: 1215115-03-9
- PubChem CID: 45138018
- ChemSpider: 114849422
- ChEMBL: ChEMBL5404494

Chemical and physical data
- Formula: C_{21}H_{22}N_{2}O_{4}S_{2}
- Molar mass: 430.54 g·mol^{−1}
- 3D model (JSmol): Interactive image
- SMILES: CC(C)(C)C1=CC=C(C=C1)S(=O)(=O)NC2=CC3=C(C=C2)SC(=C3)/C=C/C(=O)NO
- InChI: InChI=1S/C21H22N2O4S2/c1-21(2,3)15-4-8-18(9-5-15)29(26,27)23-16-6-10-19-14(12-16)13-17(28-19)7-11-20(24)22-25/h4-13,23,25H,1-3H3,(H,22,24)/b11-7+; Key:RIYPLPNXICDUCS-YRNVUSSQSA-N

KH-3 is an experimental drug which acts as an inhibitor of the RNA-binding HuR protein. Elevated levels of HuR are found in many forms of cancer, and KH-3 is being researched for potential applications in cancer treatment.

== See also ==
- CMLD-2
- SRI-42127
