= PLK2 =

Protein-coding gene in the species Homo sapiens

Identifiers
- Aliases: PLK2, SNK, hPlk2, hSNK, polo like kinase 2
- External IDs: OMIM: 607023; MGI: 1099790; GeneCards: PLK2
Available structures
PDB	Ortholog search: PDBe RCSB
PDB	List of PDB id codes 4I5M, 4I5P, 4I6B, 4I6F, 4I6H, 4RS6, 4XB0
Enzyme activity
EC #	BRENDA	ExPASy	KEGG	MetaCyc
2.7.11.21	↗	↗	↗	↗

Gene location (Human)
Chr.	Chromosome 5 (human)
Band	5q11.2	Start	58,453,982 bp
Band	5q11.2	End	58,460,139 bp

Gene location (Mouse)
Chr.	Chromosome 13 (mouse)
Band	13|13 D2.1	Start	110,531,580 bp
Band	13|13 D2.1	End	110,537,378 bp
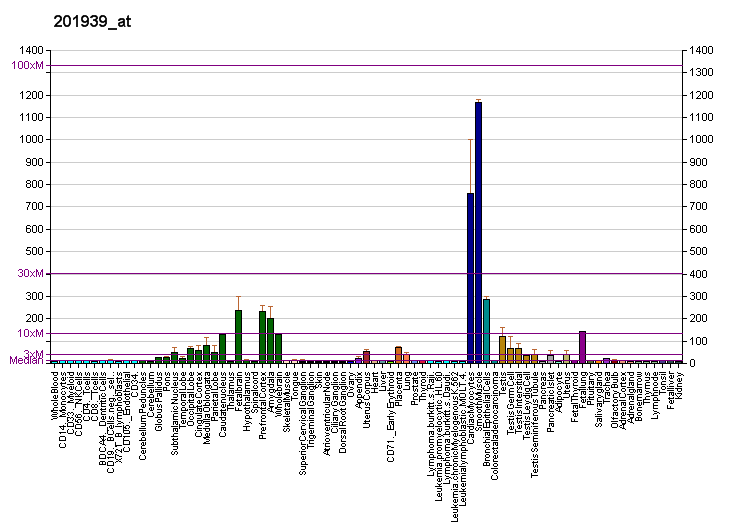
RNA expression pattern
Bgee	Human / Mouse (ortholog); Top expressed in: spleen; apex of heart; canal of the cervix; ectocervix; islet of Langerhans; epithelium of colon; skin of abdomen; Achilles tendon; gallbladder; tibial nerve / Top expressed in: CA3 field; Region I of hippocampus proper; perirhinal cortex; entorhinal cortex; primary motor cortex; primary visual cortex; olfactory tubercle; choroid plexus of fourth ventricle; superior frontal gyrus; left lung lobe; More reference expression data
BioGPS	More reference expression data
Gene ontology
Molecular function	transferase activity; nucleotide binding; protein kinase activity; protein-containing complex binding; signal transducer activity; ATP-dependent protein binding; kinase activity; protein binding; ATP binding; protein serine/threonine kinase activity
Cellular component	cytoplasm; centrosome; cell projection; intracellular anatomical structure; dendrite; centriole; chromatin; cytoskeleton; cytosol
Biological process	positive regulation of protein catabolic process; positive regulation of autophagy; phosphorylation; mitotic cell cycle checkpoint signaling; G1 phase; mitotic spindle organization; Rap protein signal transduction; regulation of centriole replication; negative regulation of apoptotic process; memory; regulation of synaptic plasticity; protein phosphorylation; peptidyl-serine phosphorylation; long-term depression; mitotic cell cycle; positive regulation of I-kappaB kinase/NF-kappaB signaling; Ras protein signal transduction; positive regulation of protein binding; negative regulation of dendritic spine development; positive regulation of proteasomal ubiquitin-dependent protein catabolic process; long-term potentiation; DNA damage response, signal transduction by p53 class mediator resulting in cell cycle arrest
Sources:Amigo / QuickGO
Orthologs
Databases	NCBI: entry; OMA: entry
Species	Human	Mouse
Entrez	10769	20620
Ensembl	ENSG00000145632	ENSMUSG00000021701
UniProt	Q9NYY3	P53351
RefSeq (mRNA)	NM_006622; NM_001252226	NM_152804
RefSeq (protein)	NP_001239155; NP_006613	NP_690017
Location (UCSC)	Chr 5: 58.45 – 58.46 Mb	Chr 13: 110.53 – 110.54 Mb
PubMed search
- Wikidata
View/Edit Human	View/Edit Mouse

Serine/threonine-protein kinase PLK2 is an enzyme that in humans is encoded by the PLK2 gene.

Serum-inducible kinase is a member of the 'polo' family of serine/threonine protein kinases that have a role in normal cell division. [supplied by OMIM]
