= Cerebrolysin =

Experimental drug for neurodegenerative disorders

Clinical data
- Trade names: 速利清
- Other names: FPF-1070, 脑蛋白水解物 [cerebroprotein hydrolysate]
- AHFS/Drugs.com

Identifiers
- CAS Number: 12656-61-0
- DrugBank: DB16599
- UNII: 37KZM6S21G

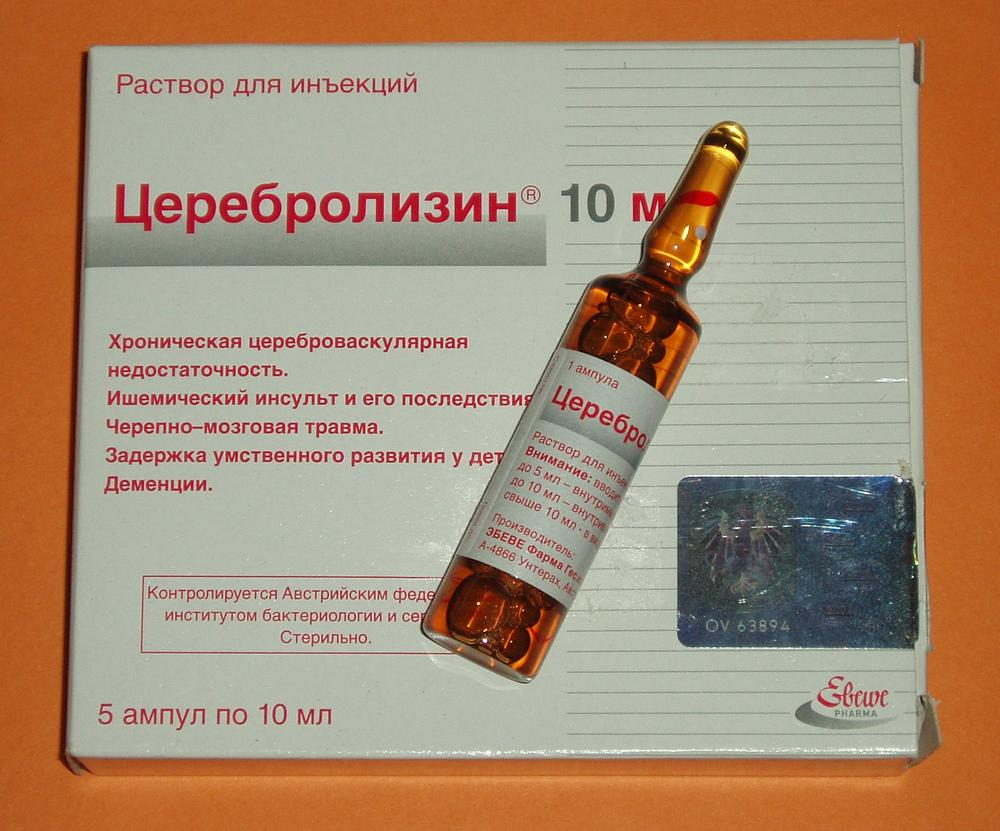
Cerebrolysin packaged in Russia

Cerebrolysin (developmental code name FPF-1070) is an experimental mixture of enzymatically-treated peptides derived from pig brain whose constituents can include brain-derived neurotrophic factor (BDNF), glial cell line-derived neurotrophic factor (GDNF), nerve growth factor (NGF), and ciliary neurotrophic factor (CNTF). Although it is under preliminary study for its potential to treat various brain diseases, it is used as a therapy in dozens of countries in Eurasia.

Cerebrolysin has been studied for potential treatment of several neurodegenerative diseases, with only preliminary research, as of 2023. No clear benefit in the treatment of acute stroke has been found, and an increased rate of spontaneous adverse effects requiring hospitalization is reported. Some positive effects have been reported when cerebrolysin is used to treat vascular dementia.

== Research ==
=== Stroke ===
A 2023 review indicated that cerebrolysin or cerebrolysin-like peptide mixtures from cattle brain likely provide no benefit for preventing all-cause death in acute ischemic stroke, and that higher quality studies are needed. In addition, cerebrolysin might cause a higher rate of spontaneous adverse events requiring hospitalization.

Studies of ischemic stroke in Asian subpopulations found an absence of benefit. A 2020 study suggested a lack of benefit in hemorrhagic stroke related to cerebral aneurysm.

=== Dementia ===
Reviews of preliminary research indicate a possible improvement in cognitive function using cerebrolysin for vascular dementia and Alzheimer's disease, although further high-quality research is needed.

=== Other ===
Early studies have suggested potential use of cerebrolysin with a wide variety of neurodegenerative disorders, including traumatic brain injury, schizophrenia, multiple sclerosis, cerebral palsy and spinal cord injury although research is still preliminary.

== Adverse effects ==
Upon injection, adverse effects of cerebrolysin include nausea, dizziness, headache, and sweating. It is not recommended for use in people with epilepsy, kidney disease, or hypersensitivity to the compound constituents.

In trials studying the use of cerebrolysin after acute stroke, there was no increased risk of "serious adverse events" requiring hospitalization. These were specifically defined as "...any untoward medical occurrence that, at any dose, resulted in death, [was] life-threatening, required inpatient hospitalisation or resulted in prolongation of existing hospitalisation, resulted in persistent or significant disability/incapacity, [was] a congenital anomaly/birth defect, or [was] a medically important event or reaction".

== Pharmacology ==
Laboratory studies indicate there may be neurotrophic effects of cerebrolysin similar to endogenous mechanisms, although its specific molecular effects are not clear.

Cerebrolysin is given by injection. Some of the peptides in cerebrolysin are short-lived once in the blood (for example, the half-life of BDNF is only 10 minutes).

== Regulatory ==
Although cerebrolysin is used in Russia, Eastern European countries, China, and other Asian countries, its status as a government-approved drug is unclear. It is only available by prescription from a physician.

As of October 2020, cerebrolysin was not an approved drug in the United States.
