= Multiple system atrophy =

Neurodegenerative disorder

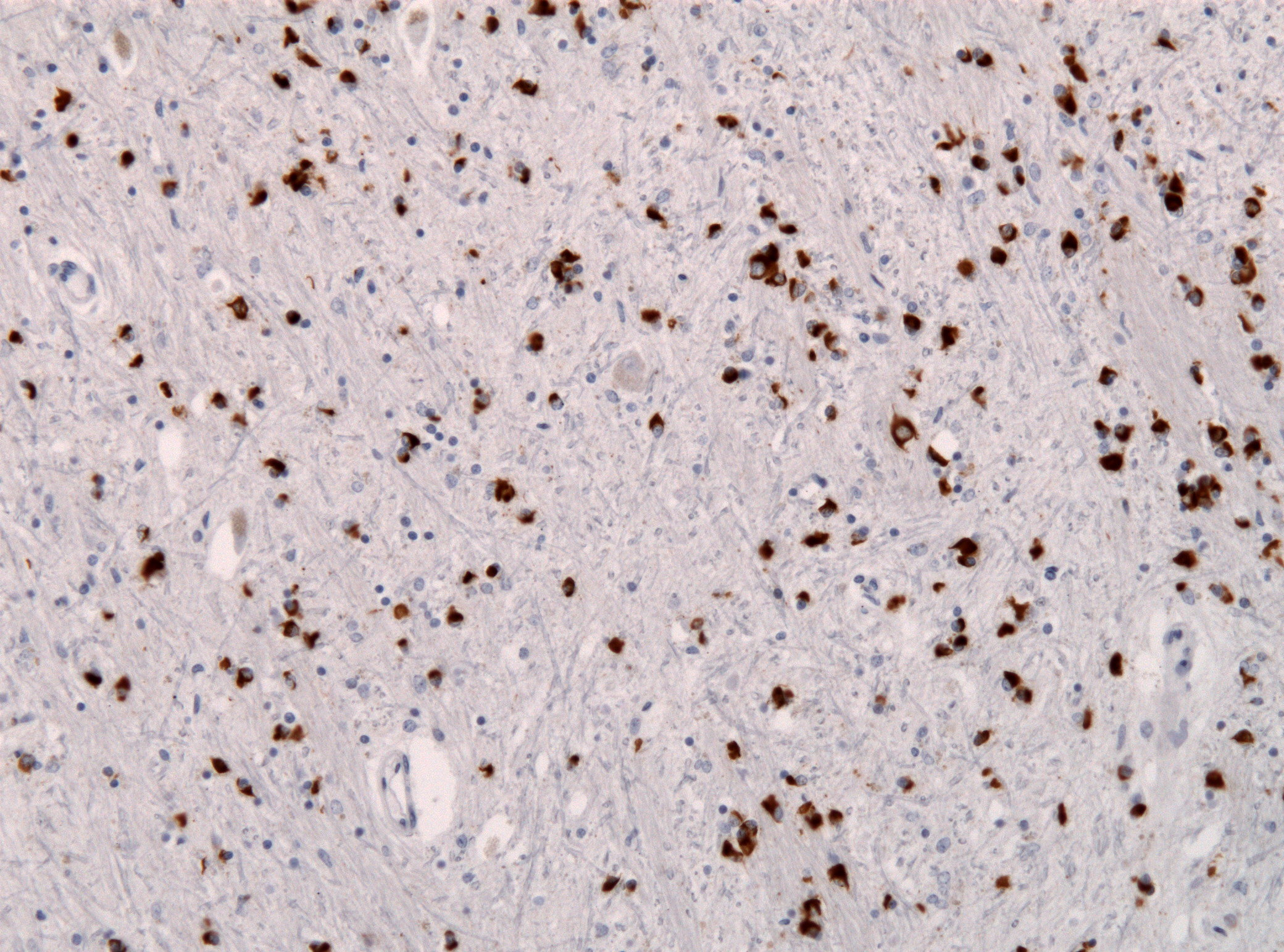
- Alpha-synuclein immunohistochemistry of the brain showing many glial inclusion bodies
- Specialty: Neurology
- Symptoms: Parkinsonism, xerostomia, dysautonomia, ataxia
- Complications: Cardiac arrest, infections, aspiration pneumonia
- Usual onset: 50–60 years
- Duration: Long term
- Types: MSA-P; MSA-C
- Causes: Unknown
- Diagnostic method: MRI, CT scan, autopsy
- Treatment: Physical therapy, hospice care
- Medication: L-DOPA, fludrocortisone, midodrine
- Prognosis: Life expectancy 6–12 years after onset of symptoms
- Frequency: 5 per 100,000 people

Multiple system atrophy (MSA) is a rare neurodegenerative disorder characterized by tremors, slow movement, muscle rigidity, postural instability (collectively known as parkinsonism), autonomic dysfunction and ataxia. This is caused by progressive degeneration of neurons in several parts of the brain including the basal ganglia, inferior olivary nucleus, and cerebellum. MSA was first described in 1960 by Milton Shy and Glen Drager and is also known as Shy–Drager syndrome.

Many people affected by MSA experience dysfunction of the autonomic nervous system, which commonly manifests as orthostatic hypotension, impotence, loss of sweating, dry mouth, urinary retention and incontinence. Palsy of the vocal cords is an important and sometimes initial clinical manifestation of the disorder.

A prion of the alpha-synuclein protein within affected neurons may cause MSA. About 55% of MSA cases occur in men, with those affected first showing symptoms at the age of 50–60 years. MSA often presents with some of the same symptoms as Parkinson's disease. However, those with MSA generally show little response to the dopamine agonists used to treat Parkinson's disease and only about 9% of MSA patients with tremor exhibit a true parkinsonian pill-rolling tremor (an involuntary, rhythmic movement of the thumb and index finger suggesting the rolling of a pill between them).

MSA is distinct from multisystem proteinopathy, a more common muscle-wasting syndrome. MSA is also different from multiple organ dysfunction syndrome, sometimes referred to as multiple organ failure, and from multiple organ system failures, an often-fatal complication of septic shock and other severe illnesses or injuries.

== Signs and symptoms ==
MSA is characterized by autonomic dysfunction and at least one motor abnormality (clinically established MSA criteria 2022):

- autonomic dysfunction: Post-void urinary residual volume ≥100 mL (usually by ultrasound); unexplained urinary urge incontinence; or neurogenic orthostatic hypotension (≥20/10 mmHg blood pressure drop) within 3 minutes (usually by head‐up tilt)
- parkinsonism (muscle rigidity +/ tremor and slow movement: MSA-P)
- cerebellar ataxia (Poor coordination/unsteady walking: MSA-C)

A variant with combined features of MSA and dementia with Lewy bodies may also exist. There have also been occasional instances of frontotemporal lobar degeneration associated with MSA.

=== Initial presentation ===
The most common first sign of MSA is the appearance of an "akinetic-rigid syndrome" (i.e. slowness of initiation of movement resembling Parkinson's disease) found in 62% at first presentation. Other common signs at onset include problems with balance (cerebellar ataxia) found in 22% at first presentation, followed by genito-urinary symptoms (9%); both men and women often experience urgency, increased frequency, incomplete bladder emptying, or an inability to pass urine (retention). About 1 in 5 MSA patients experience a fall in their first year of disease.

For men, the first sign can be erectile dysfunction. Women have also reported reduced genital sensitivity.

=== Progression ===
As the disease progresses, one of three groups of symptoms predominates. These are:

1. Parkinsonism – slow, stiff movement, writing becomes small and spidery
2. Cerebellar dysfunction – difficulty coordinating movement and balance
3. Autonomic nervous system dysfunction – impaired automatic body functions, including one, some, or all of the following:

- postural or orthostatic hypotension, resulting in dizziness or fainting upon standing up
- urinary incontinence or urinary retention
- impotence
- constipation
- vocal cord paralysis
- dry mouth and skin
- trouble regulating body temperature due to sweating deficiency in all parts of the body
- loud snoring, abnormal breathing or inspiratory stridor during sleep
- other sleep disorders including sleep apnea, REM behavior disorder
- double vision
- muscle twitches
- cognitive impairment

== Genetics ==
Variations in the gene that encodes alpha-synuclein may play a role in MSA.

One study found a correlation between the deletion of genes in a specific genetic region and the development of MSA in a group of Japanese patients. The region in question includes the SHC2 gene which, in mice and rats, appears to have some function in the nervous system. The authors of this study hypothesized that there may be a link between the deletion of the SHC2 and the development of MSA.

A follow-up study was unable to replicate this finding in American MSA patients. The authors of the study concluded that "Our results indicate that SHC2 gene deletions underlie few, if any, cases of well-characterized MSA in the US population. This is in contrast to the Japanese experience reported by Sasaki et al., likely reflecting heterogeneity of the disease in different genetic backgrounds."

Another study investigated the frequency of RFC1 intronic repeat expansions, a phenomenon implicated in CANVAS (a disease with a diagnostic overlap with MSA). The study concluded that these repeats were absent in pathologically confirmed MSA, suggesting an alternative genetic cause.

== Pathophysiology ==
The defining pathologic feature of multiple system atrophy is the presence of inclusion bodies (known as glial cytoplasmic inclusions or Papp-Lantos bodies) consisting of alpha-synuclein in oligodendrocytes. In addition, neurons are lost in several regions of the nervous system, particularly in the basal ganglia, inferior olivary nuclei, cerebellum, pons, and spinal cord. Reactive astrocytes and microglia are prominent in damaged areas of the central nervous system, especially in regions with abundant oligodendroglial inclusions. Neuronal cytoplasmic inclusions also are present in MSA, although these are much less numerous than are oligodendroglial inclusions. Inclusions sometimes occur in the cell nucleus of neurons and oligodendrocytes. Outside of the central nervous system, alpha‐synuclein inclusions may be found in Schwann cells of cranial, spinal and autonomic nerves and in the enteric nervous system.

The major proteinaceous component of glial and neuronal inclusions in MSA is alpha-synuclein that is phosphorylated at serine residue 129. The conformation of alpha-synuclein in MSA is different from that of alpha-synuclein in Lewy bodies, indicative of variant proteopathic strains. In addition to variations in the gene for alpha-synuclein, a variety of other potential genetic and environmental risk factors have been proposed.

The origin of the alpha-synuclein that forms inclusions in oligodendrocytes is uncertain. Compared to neurons, oligodendrocytes produce little or no alpha-synuclein themselves, suggesting that these cells take up the protein that is generated by neurons. For example, it has been proposed that the α-synuclein inclusions found in oligodendrocytes result from the pruning and engulfment of diseased axonal segments containing aggregated α-synuclein, i.e., of Lewy neurites. Research has shown that the strain of the protein generated by oligodendrocytes causes a more aggressive type of disease than does the Lewy body strain. The factors in oligodendrocytes that induce the formation of especially potent alpha-synuclein seeds are not known.

Along with the primary protein alpha-synuclein, glial cytoplasmic inclusions contain several other types of protein as well as lysosomes and peroxisomes. Tau proteins (the main components of neurofibrillary tangles) have been found in some glial cytoplasmic inclusions.

== Diagnosis ==
=== Clinical ===
Clinical diagnostic criteria were defined in 1998 and updated in 2007 and in 2022. Certain signs and symptoms of MSA also occur with other disorders, such as Parkinson's disease, making the diagnosis more difficult.

Features characteristic of OPCA include progressive cerebellar ataxia, leading to clumsiness in body movements, veering from midline when walking, wide-based stance, and falls without signs of paralysis or weakness. Clinical presentation can vary greatly between patients, but mostly affects speech, balance and walking. Other possible neurological problems include spasmodic dysphonia, hypertonia, hyperreflexia, rigidity, dysarthria, dysphagia and neck dystonic posture. Dysarthria is characterized by increased pauses of irregular duration, impaired coordination of vocal pitch, prolonged syllables and an overall irregular speech rhythm. Diagnosis may be based on a thorough medical exam; the presence of signs and symptoms; imaging studies; various laboratory tests; and an evaluation of the family history.

=== Radiologic ===
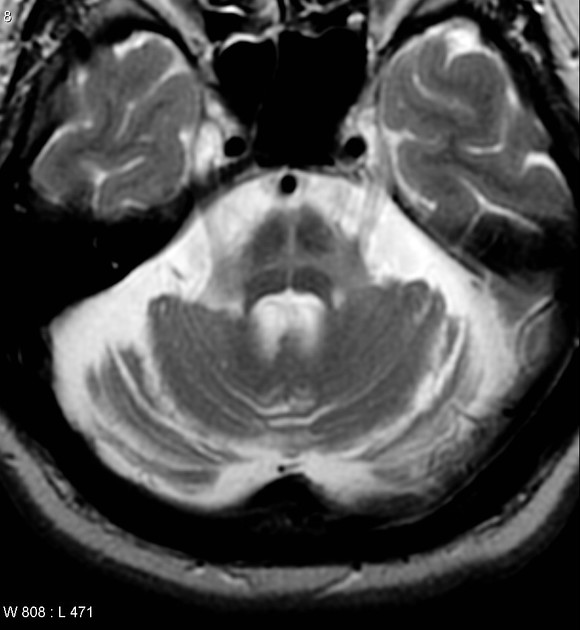
The "Hot Cross Bun" sign, found in MSA with MRI

Both MRI and CT scanning may show a decrease in the size of the cerebellum and pons in those with cerebellar features (MSA-C). The putamen is hypointense on T2-weighted MRI and may show an increased deposition of iron in the Parkinsonian (MSA-P) form. In MSA-C, a "hot cross bun" sign is sometimes found; it reflects atrophy of the pontocerebellar tracts that give T2 hyper intense signal intensity in the atrophic pons.

MRI changes are not required to diagnose the disease as these features are often absent, especially early in the course of the disease. Additionally, the changes can be quite subtle and are usually missed by examiners who are not experienced with MSA.

=== Pathologic ===
Pathological diagnosis can only be made at autopsy by finding abundant glial cytoplasmic inclusions (GCIs) on histological specimens of the central nervous system.

Olivopontocerebellar atrophy can be used as a pathological term to describe degeneration of neurons in specific areas of the brain – the cerebellum, pons, and inferior olivary nucleus. OPCA is present in several neurodegenerative syndromes, including inherited and non-inherited forms of ataxia (such as the hereditary spinocerebellar ataxia known as Machado–Joseph disease) and MSA, with which it is primarily associated.

Contrary to most other synucleinopathies, which develop α-synuclein inclusions primarily in neuronal cell populations, MSA presents with extensive pathological α-synuclein inclusions in the cytosol of oligodendrocytes (glial cytoplasmic inclusions), with limited pathology in neurons. MSA also differs from other synucleinopathies in its regional pathological presentation, with α-synuclein positive inclusions detected predominantly in the striatum, midbrain, pons, medulla and cerebellum, rather than the brainstem, limbic and cortical regions typically effected in Lewy inclusion diseases. However, recent studies using novel, monoclonal antibodies specific for C-terminally truncated α-synuclein (αSynΔC) have now shown that neuronal α-synuclein pathology is more abundant than previously thought. One group revealed robust α-synuclein pathology in the pontine nuclei and medullary inferior olivary nucleus upon histological analysis of neurological tissue from MSA patients. Histopathological investigation on six cases of pathologically confirmed MSA, using antibodies directed at a variety of α-synuclein epitopes, revealed substantial variation in α-synuclein protein deposition across both cases and brain regions within cases, providing evidence for 'strains' of aggregated conformers that may differentially promote pathological prion-like spread.

In 2020, researchers at The University of Texas Health Science Center at Houston concluded that protein misfolding cyclic amplification could be used to distinguish between two progressive neurodegenerative diseases, Parkinson's disease and multiple system atrophy, being the first process to give an objective diagnosis of Multiple System Atrophy instead of just a differential diagnosis.

=== Classification ===
MSA is one of several neurodegenerative diseases known as synucleinopathies: they have in common an abnormal accumulation of alpha-synuclein protein in various parts of the brain. Other synucleinopathies include Parkinson's disease, the Lewy body dementias, and other more rare conditions.

==== Old terminology ====
Olivopontocerebellar atrophy
- Other names: Multiple system atrophy – cerebellar subtype
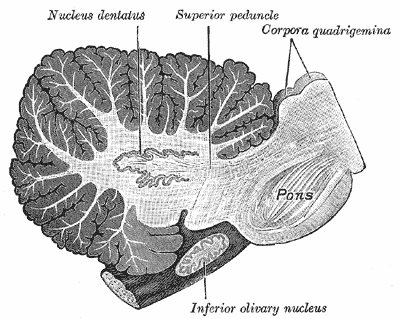
- Sagittal section through right cerebellar hemisphere. The right olive has also been cut sagittally.
- Specialty: Neurology
- Frequency: 0.005%

Historically, many terms were used to refer to this disorder, based on the predominant systems presented. These terms were discontinued by consensus in 1996 and replaced with MSA and its subtypes, but awareness of these older terms and their definitions is helpful to understanding the relevant literature prior to 1996. These include striatonigral degeneration (SND), olivopontocerebellar atrophy (OPCA), and Shy–Drager syndrome. A table describing the characteristics and modern names of these conditions follows:

| Historical Name | Characteristics | Modern name and abbreviation |
|---|---|---|
| Striatonigral degeneration | predominating Parkinson's-like symptoms | MSA-P, "p" = parkinsonian subtype |
| Sporadic olivopontocerebellar atrophy (OPCA) | characterized by progressive ataxia (an inability to coordinate voluntary muscular movements) of the gait and arms and dysarthria (difficulty in articulating words) | MSA-C, "c" = cerebellar dysfunction subtype |
| Shy–Drager syndrome | characterized by Parkinsonism plus a more pronounced failure of the autonomic nervous system. | No modern equivalent – this terminology fell out of favour and was not specified in the 2007 consensus paper. The earlier consensus of 1998 referred to MSA-A, "a" = autonomic dysfunction subtype but this subtype is no longer used. |

The term olivopontocerebellar atrophy was originally coined by Joseph Jules Dejerine and André Thomas. It was subdivided as:

| Number | OMIM | Alt. name | Inheritance |
|---|---|---|---|
| OPCA type 2 | 258300 | Fickler-Winkler type OPCA | autosomal recessive |
| OPCA type 5 | 164700 | OPCA with dementia and extrapyramidal signs | autosomal dominant |

Non-hereditary diseases formerly categorized as olivopontocerebellar atrophy have were reclassified as forms of MSA as well as to four hereditary types, that have been currently reclassified as four different forms of spinocerebellar ataxia:

| Hereditary OPCA type | OPCA name | SCA # | Gene | OMIM |
|---|---|---|---|---|
| OPCA type 1 | "Menzel type OPCA" | SCA1 | ATXN1 | 164400 |
| OPCA type 2, autosomal dominant | "Holguin type OPCA" | SCA2 | ATXN2 | 183090 |
| OPCA type 3 | "OPCA with retinal degeneration" | SCA7 | ATXN7 | 164500 |
| OPCA type 4 | "Schut-Haymaker type OPCA" | SCA1 | ATXN1 | 164400 |

==== Current terminology ====
The current terminology and diagnostic criteria for the disease were established at a 2007 conference of experts and set forth in a position paper. This Second Consensus Statement defines two categories of MSA, based on the predominant symptoms of the disease at the time of evaluation. These are:

- MSA with predominant parkinsonism (MSA-P) – defined as MSA where extrapyramidal features predominate. It is sometimes termed striatonigral degeneration, a parkinsonian variant.
- MSA with cerebellar features (MSA-C) – defined as MSA in which cerebellar ataxia predominates. It is sometimes termed sporadic olivopontocerebellar atrophy.

== Management ==
=== Supervision ===
Ongoing care from a neurologist specializing in movement disorders is recommended, because the complex symptoms of MSA are often not familiar to less-specialized neurologists. Hospice/homecare services can be very useful as disability progresses.

=== Drug therapy ===
Levodopa (L-Dopa), a drug used in the treatment of Parkinson's disease, improves parkinsonian symptoms in a small percentage of MSA patients. A recent trial reported that only 1.5% of MSA patients experienced any improvement at all when taking levodopa, their improvement was less than 50%, and even that improvement was a transient effect lasting less than one year. Poor response to L-Dopa has been suggested as a possible element in the differential diagnosis of MSA from Parkinson's disease.The drug riluzole is ineffective in treating MSA or PSP.

=== Rehabilitation ===
Management by rehabilitation professionals including physiatrists, physiotherapists, occupational therapists, speech therapists, and others for difficulties with walking/movement, daily tasks, and speech problems is essential.

Physiotherapists can help to maintain the patient's mobility and will help to prevent contractures. Instructing patients in gait training will help to improve their mobility and decrease their risk of falls. A physiotherapist may also prescribe mobility aids such as a cane or a walker to increase the patient's safety.

Speech therapists may assist in assessing, treating and supporting speech (dysarthria) and swallowing difficulties (dysphagia). Speech changes mean that alternative communication may be needed, for example, communication aids or word charts.Early intervention of swallowing difficulties is particularly useful to allow for discussion around tube feeding further in the disease progression. At some point in the progression of the disease, fluid and food modification may be implemented.

=== Avoidance of postural hypotension ===
One particularly serious problem, the drop in blood pressure upon standing up (with risk of fainting and thus injury from falling), often responds to fludrocortisone, a synthetic mineralocorticoid. Another common drug treatment is the alpha-agonist midodrine.

Non-drug treatments include "head-up tilt" (elevating the head of the whole bed by about 10 degrees), salt tablets or increasing salt in the diet, generous intake of fluids, and pressure (elastic) stockings. Avoidance of triggers of low blood pressure, such as hot weather, alcohol, and dehydration, are crucial. The patient can be taught to move and transfer from sitting to standing slowly to decrease risk of falls and limit the effect of postural hypotension. Instruction in ankle pumping helps to return blood in the legs to the systemic circulation. Other preventative measures are raising the head of the bed by 8 in (20.3 cm), and the use of compression stockings and abdominal binders.

==== Supine hypertension ====
In addition to orthostatic hypotension, supine hypertension, where the BP is excessively high lying down, is a frequent problem in multiple system atrophy. Treatment of one symptom can easily aggravate the other, and supine hypertension in such patients has been linked to the same cardiovascular complications as essential hypertension.

=== Support ===
Social workers and occupational therapists can also help with coping with disability through the provision of equipment and home adaptations, services for caregivers and access to healthcare services, both for the person with MSA as well as family caregivers.

== Prognosis ==
The average lifespan after the onset of symptoms in patients with MSA is 6–10 years. Approximately 60% of patients require a wheelchair within five years of onset of the motor symptoms, and few patients survive beyond 12 years. The disease progresses without remission at a variable rate. Those who present at an older age, those with parkinsonian features, and those with severe autonomic dysfunction have a poorer prognosis. Those with predominantly cerebellar features and those who display autonomic dysfunction later have a better prognosis.

=== Causes of death ===
The most common causes of death are sudden death and death caused by infections, which include urinary catheterization infections, feeding tube infections, and aspiration pneumonia. Some deaths are caused by cachexia, also known as wasting syndrome.

== Epidemiology ==
Multiple system atrophy is estimated to affect approximately 5 per 100,000 people. At autopsy, many patients diagnosed during life with Parkinson's disease are found actually to have MSA, suggesting that the actual incidence of MSA is higher than that estimate. While some suggest that MSA affects slightly more men than women (1.3:1), others suggest that the two sexes are equally likely to be affected. The condition most commonly presents in persons aged 50–60.

== Research ==
Mesenchymal stem cell therapy may delay the progression of neurological deficits in patients with MSA-cerebellar type.

== Notable cases ==
- Nikolai Andrianov was a Soviet/Russian gymnast who held the record for men for the most Olympic medals at 15 (7 gold medals, 5 silver medals, 3 bronze medals) until Michael Phelps surpassed him at the 2008 Beijing Summer Olympics.
- Todd J. Campbell (1956–2021), United States district judge and counsel to former Vice President Al Gore.
- Singer and songwriter Johnny Cash wrote in his autobiography that he was diagnosed with Shy–Drager in 1997.
- Ronald Green (1944–2012), American-Israeli basketball player
- Joseph C. Howard Sr. (1922–2000) was the first African American to serve as a United States district judge of the United States District Court for the District of Maryland.
- Kenneth More British actor, originally diagnosed with Parkinson's disease.
- Chef Kerry Simon died from complications of MSA.
- David Colin Sherrington FRS (1945–2014), noted polymer chemist, who was diagnosed in 2012 and died from pneumonia two years later.
- Karsten Heuer (1968–2024) Canadian Biologist, Conservationist, Filmmaker and Author.

== See also ==
- Olivopontocerebellar atrophy-deafness syndrome
