= Alpha-synuclein =

Protein found in humans

SNCA
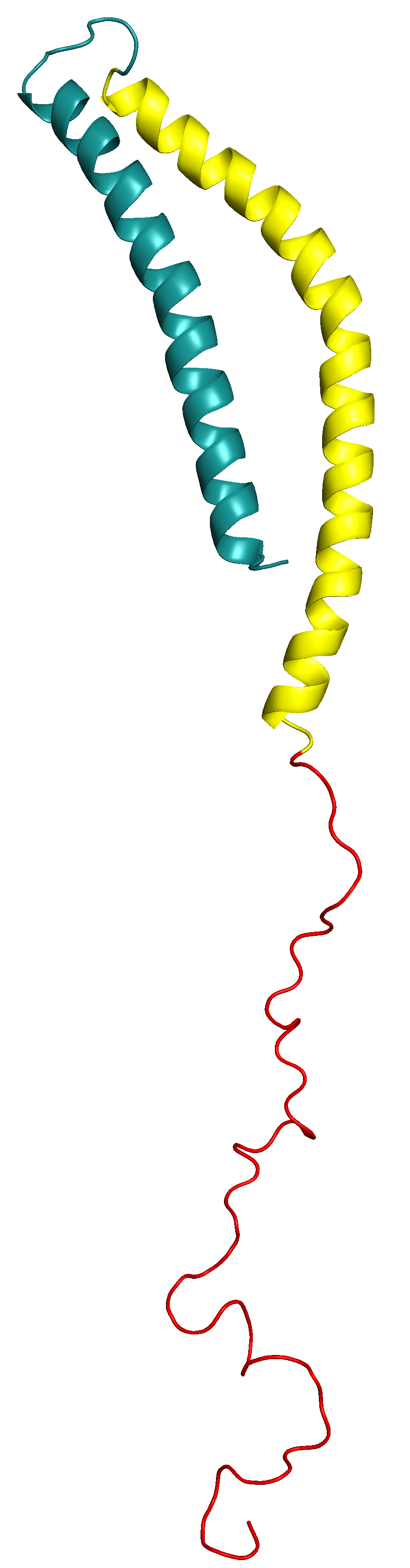

Identifiers
- Aliases: SNCA, NACP, PARK1, PARK4, PD1, synuclein alpha
- External IDs: OMIM: 163890; MGI: 1277151; GeneCards: SNCA
Available structures
PDB	Ortholog search: PDBe RCSB
PDB	List of PDB id codes 1XQ8, 2JN5, 2KKW, 2M55, 2X6M, 3Q25, 3Q26, 3Q27, 3Q28, 3Q29, 4BXL, 4R0U, 4R0W, 4RIK, 4RIL, 4ZNN, 5CRW, 2N0A

Gene location (Human)
Chr.	Chromosome 4 (human)
Band	4q22.1	Start	89,700,345 bp
Band	4q22.1	End	89,838,315 bp

Gene location (Mouse)
Chr.	Chromosome 6 (mouse)
Band	6 B3|6 29.15 cM	Start	60,708,559 bp
Band	6 B3|6 29.15 cM	End	60,806,839 bp
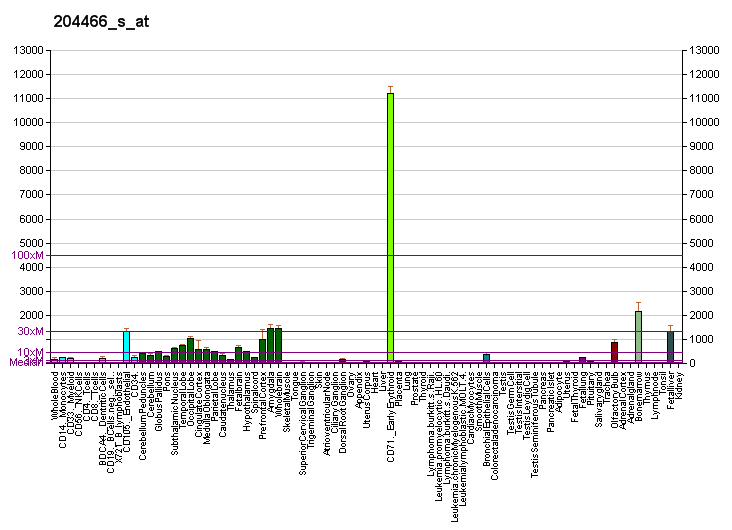

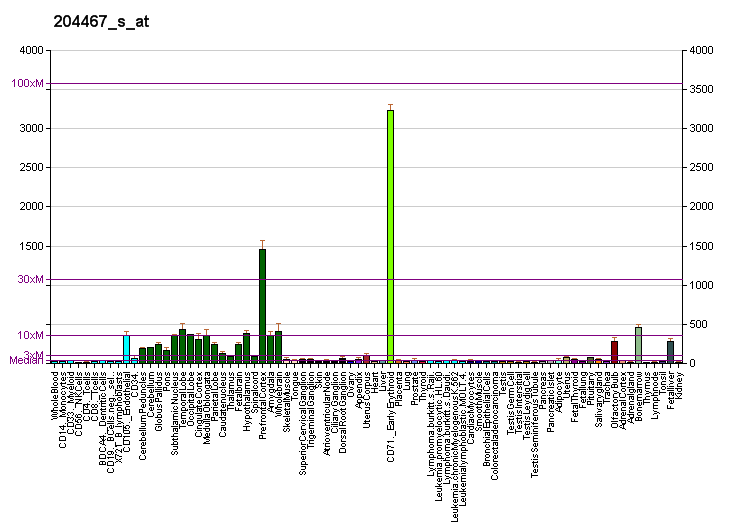
RNA expression pattern
Bgee	Human / Mouse (ortholog); Top expressed in: trabecular bone; orbitofrontal cortex; pons; Brodmann area 46; endothelial cell; Brodmann area 23; tendon of biceps brachii; postcentral gyrus; middle temporal gyrus; monocyte / Top expressed in: dentate gyrus of hippocampal formation granule cell; subiculum; fetal liver hematopoietic progenitor cell; nucleus accumbens; dorsal striatum; barrel cortex; anterior amygdaloid area; ventral tegmental area; hippocampus proper; habenula; More reference expression data
BioGPS	More reference expression data
Gene ontology
Molecular function	calcium ion binding; protein N-terminus binding; ferrous iron binding; phospholipid binding; metal ion binding; fatty acid binding; oxidoreductase activity; magnesium ion binding; histone binding; zinc ion binding; cysteine-type endopeptidase inhibitor activity involved in apoptotic process; protein binding; kinesin binding; tau protein binding; copper ion binding; microtubule binding; alpha-tubulin binding; phosphoprotein binding; phospholipase D inhibitor activity; beta-tubulin binding; identical protein binding; dynein complex binding; Hsp70 protein binding; cuprous ion binding; enzyme binding; protein domain specific binding; phospholipase binding; actin binding; SNARE binding
Cellular component	postsynapse; cytoplasm; cytosol; membrane; synapse; extracellular region; mitochondrion; actin cytoskeleton; perinuclear region of cytoplasm; cytoskeleton; nucleus; rough endoplasmic reticulum; ribosome; synaptic vesicle; mitochondrial respiratory chain complex I; platelet alpha granule membrane; terminal bouton; lysosome; Golgi apparatus; intracellular membrane-bounded organelle; growth cone; plasma membrane; axon; cell cortex; inclusion body; nuclear outer membrane; axon terminus; cell junction; cytoplasmic vesicle membrane; extracellular space; supramolecular fiber; soma; mitochondrial outer membrane; mitochondrial inner membrane; mitochondrial intermembrane space; mitochondrial matrix; presynapse; synaptic vesicle membrane
Biological process	negative regulation of neuron apoptotic process; negative regulation of norepinephrine uptake; response to interleukin-1; response to interferon-gamma; regulation of glutamate secretion; response to magnesium ion; synaptic transmission, dopaminergic; regulation of reactive oxygen species biosynthetic process; positive regulation of protein serine/threonine kinase activity; cellular response to epinephrine stimulus; positive regulation of synaptic transmission; cellular response to copper ion; regulation of synaptic vesicle recycling; activation of cysteine-type endopeptidase activity involved in apoptotic process; response to cocaine; positive regulation of glutathione peroxidase activity; negative regulation of platelet-derived growth factor receptor signaling pathway; negative regulation of serotonin uptake; regulation of dopamine secretion; regulation of long-term neuronal synaptic plasticity; response to iron(II) ion; behavioral response to cocaine; regulation of locomotion; adult locomotory behavior; positive regulation of neurotransmitter secretion; cellular response to fibroblast growth factor stimulus; positive regulation of peptidyl-serine phosphorylation; regulation of acyl-CoA biosynthetic process; positive regulation of endocytosis; synaptic vesicle endocytosis; excitatory postsynaptic potential; regulation of neuronal synaptic plasticity; mitochondrial membrane organization; negative regulation of mitochondrial electron transport, NADH to ubiquinone; chemical synaptic transmission; negative regulation of protein phosphorylation; negative regulation of exocytosis; positive regulation of hydrogen peroxide catabolic process; negative regulation of microtubule polymerization; calcium ion homeostasis; mitochondrial ATP synthesis coupled electron transport; positive regulation of inositol phosphate biosynthetic process; dopamine biosynthetic process; synapse organization; negative regulation of dopamine metabolic process; positive regulation of release of sequestered calcium ion into cytosol; negative regulation of apoptotic process; regulation of reactive oxygen species metabolic process; regulation of neurotransmitter secretion; negative regulation of dopamine uptake involved in synaptic transmission; negative regulation of transcription by RNA polymerase II; microglial cell activation; dopamine uptake involved in synaptic transmission; response to lipopolysaccharide; protein destabilization; neutral lipid metabolic process; negative regulation of thrombin-activated receptor signaling pathway; membrane organization; negative regulation of transporter activity; negative regulation of cysteine-type endopeptidase activity involved in apoptotic process; regulation of phospholipase activity; negative regulation of chaperone-mediated autophagy; ageing; receptor internalization; negative regulation of monooxygenase activity; fatty acid metabolic process; dopamine metabolic process; regulation of neuron death; positive regulation of apoptotic process; synaptic vesicle transport; cellular response to oxidative stress; phospholipid metabolic process; negative regulation of histone acetylation; regulation of macrophage activation; positive regulation of receptor recycling; long-term potentiation; apoptotic process; supramolecular fiber organization; regulation of presynapse assembly; positive regulation of inflammatory response; positive regulation of neuron death; negative regulation of neuron death; response to desipramine; regulation of transmembrane transporter activity; regulation of norepinephrine uptake; synaptic vesicle exocytosis; SNARE complex assembly; positive regulation of exocytosis; protein complex oligomerization; protein tetramerization; synaptic vesicle priming
Sources:Amigo / QuickGO
Orthologs
Databases	NCBI: entry; OMA: entry
Species	Human	Mouse
Entrez	6622	20617
Ensembl	ENSG00000145335	ENSMUSG00000025889
UniProt	P37840	O55042
RefSeq (mRNA)	NM_000345; NM_001146054; NM_001146055; NM_007308; NM_001375285 NM_001375286; NM_001375287; NM_001375288; NM_001375290	NM_001042451; NM_009221
RefSeq (protein)	NP_000336; NP_001139526; NP_001139527; NP_009292; NP_001362214 NP_001362215; NP_001362216; NP_001362217; NP_001362219	NP_001035916; NP_033247
Location (UCSC)	Chr 4: 89.7 – 89.84 Mb	Chr 6: 60.71 – 60.81 Mb
PubMed search
- Wikidata
View/Edit Human	View/Edit Mouse

Alpha-synuclein (aSyn) is a protein that in humans is encoded by the SNCA gene. It is a neuronal protein involved in the regulation of synaptic vesicle trafficking and the release of neurotransmitters.

Alpha-synuclein is abundant in the brain, with smaller amounts present in the heart, muscles, and other tissues. Within the brain, it is primarily localized to the axon terminals of presynaptic neurons. There, it interacts with phospholipids and other proteins. Presynaptic terminals release neurotransmitters from specialized compartments called synaptic vesicles, a process essential for neuronal communication and normal brain function.

In Parkinson's disease and related synucleinopathies, abnormal, insoluble forms of alpha-synuclein accumulate within neurons as inclusions known as Lewy bodies. Mutations in the SNCA gene are linked to familial forms of Parkinson's disease. During the process of seeded nucleation, alpha-synuclein adopts a cross-beta sheet structure characteristic of amyloid fibrils.

The human alpha-synuclein protein consists of 140 amino acids. A fragment of alpha-synuclein, known as the non-amyloid beta component (NAC) of Alzheimer's disease amyloid, was initially isolated from an amyloid-rich brain fraction and shown to derive from a precursor protein named NACP. NACP was subsequently identified as the human homologue of synuclein from the electric ray genus Torpedo, leading to its renaming as human alpha-synuclein.

== Tissue expression ==
Alpha-synuclein is a synuclein protein primarily found in neural tissue, making up as much as one percent of all proteins in the cytosol of brain cells. It is expressed highly in neurons within the frontal cortex, hippocampus, striatum, and olfactory bulb, but can also be found in the non-neuronal glial cells.

It has been established that alpha-synuclein is extensively localized in the nucleus of mammalian brain neurons, suggesting a role of alpha-synuclein in the nucleus. Synuclein is however found predominantly in the presynaptic termini, in both free or membrane-bound forms, with roughly 15% of synuclein being membrane-bound at any moment in neurons.

It has also been shown that alpha-synuclein is localized in neuronal mitochondria. Alpha-synuclein is highly expressed in the mitochondria in olfactory bulb, hippocampus, striatum and thalamus, where the cytosolic alpha-synuclein is also rich. However, the cerebral cortex and cerebellum are two exceptions, which contain rich cytosolic alpha-synuclein but very low levels of mitochondrial alpha-synuclein. It has been shown that alpha-synuclein is localized in the inner membrane of mitochondria, and that the inhibitory effect of alpha-synuclein on complex I activity of the mitochondrial respiratory chain is dose-dependent. Thus, it is suggested that alpha-synuclein in mitochondria is differentially expressed in different brain regions and the background levels of mitochondrial alpha-synuclein may be a potential factor affecting mitochondrial function and predisposing some neurons to degeneration.

At least three isoforms of synuclein are produced through alternative splicing. The majority form of the protein, and the one most investigated, is the full-length protein of 140 amino acids. Other isoforms are alpha-synuclein-126, which lacks residues 41-54 due to loss of exon 3; and alpha-synuclein-112, which lacks residues 103-130 due to loss of exon 5.

=== In the enteric nervous system (ENS) ===
First characterisations of aSyn aggregates in the ENS of PD patients has been performed on autopsied specimens in the late 1980s. It is yet unknown if the microbiome changes associated with PD are consequential to the illness process or main pathophysiology, or both.

Individuals diagnosed with various synucleinopathies often display constipation and other GI dysfunctions years prior to the onset of movement dysfunction. Abnormal misfolding and aggregation of alpha-synuclein in the enteric nervous system and its correlation with gut dysbiosis, have been reported in the literature.

Alpha synuclein potentially connects the gut-brain axis in Parkinson's disease patients. Common inherited Parkinson disease is associated with mutations in the alpha-synuclein (SNCA) gene. In the process of seeded nucleation, alpha-synuclein acquires a cross-sheet structure similar to other amyloids.

The Enterobacteriaceae, which are quite common in the human gut, can create curli, which are functional amyloid proteins. The unfolded amyloid CsgA, which is secreted by bacteria and later aggregates extracellularly to create biofilms, mediates adherence to epithelial cells, and aids in bacteriophage defense, forms the curli fibers. Oral injection of curli-producing bacteria can also boost formation and aggregation of the amyloid protein Syn in old rats and nematodes. Host inflammation responses in the intestinal tract and periphery are modulated by curli exposure. Studies in biochemistry show that endogenous, bacterial chaperones of curli are capable of briefly interacting with Syn and controlling its aggregation.

The clinical and pathological findings support the hypothesis that aSyn disease in PD occurs via a gut-brain pathway. For early diagnosis and early management in the phase of creation and propagation of aSyn, it is therefore of utmost importance to identify pathogenic aSyn in the digestive system, for example, by gastrointestinal tract (GIT) biopsies.

According to a growing body of research, intestinal dysbiosis may be a major factor in the development of Parkinson's disease by encouraging intestinal permeability, gastrointestinal inflammation, and the aggregation and spread of asyn.

Not just the CNS but other peripheral tissues, such as the GIT, have physiological aSyn expression as well as its phosphorylated variants. As suggested by Borghammer and Van Den Berge (2019), one approach is to recognise the possibility of PD subtypes with various aSyn propagation methods, including either a peripheral nervous system (PNS)-first or a CNS-first route.

While the GI tract has been linked to other neurological disorders such autism spectrum disorder, depression, anxiety, and Alzheimer's disease, protein aggregation and/or inflammation in the gut represent a new topic of investigation in synucleinopathies.

== Structure ==
Alpha-synuclein in solution is considered to be an intrinsically disordered protein, i.e. it lacks a single stable 3D structure. As of 2014, an increasing number of reports suggest, however, the presence of partial structures or mostly structured oligomeric states in the solution structure of alpha-synuclein even in the absence of lipids. This trend is also supported by a large number of single molecule (optical tweezers) measurements on single copies of monomeric alpha-synuclein as well as covalently enforced dimers or tetramers of alpha-synuclein.

Alpha-synuclein is specifically upregulated in a discrete population of presynaptic terminals of the brain during a period of acquisition-related synaptic rearrangement. It has been shown that alpha-synuclein significantly interacts with tubulin, and that alpha-synuclein may have activity as a potential microtubule-associated protein, like tau. Evidence suggests that alpha-synuclein functions as a molecular chaperone in the formation of SNARE complexes. In particular, it simultaneously binds to phospholipids of the plasma membrane via its N-terminus domain and to synaptobrevin-2 via its C-terminus domain, with increased importance during synaptic activity. Indeed, there is growing evidence that alpha-synuclein is involved in the functioning of the neuronal Golgi apparatus and vesicle trafficking.

Apparently, alpha-synuclein is essential for normal development of the cognitive functions. Knock-out mice with the targeted inactivation of the expression of alpha-synuclein show impaired spatial learning and working memory.

=== Interaction with lipid membranes ===
Experimental evidence has been collected on the interaction of alpha-synuclein with membrane and its involvement with membrane composition and turnover. Yeast genome screening has found that several genes that deal with lipid metabolism and mitochondrial fusion play a role in alpha-synuclein toxicity. Conversely, alpha-synuclein expression levels can affect the viscosity and the relative amount of fatty acids in the lipid bilayer.

Alpha-synuclein is known to directly bind to lipid membranes, associating with the negatively charged surfaces of phospholipids. Alpha-synuclein forms an extended helical structure on small unilamellar vesicles. A preferential binding to small vesicles has been found. The binding of alpha-synuclein to lipid membranes has complex effects on the latter, altering the bilayer structure and leading to the formation of small vesicles. Alpha-synuclein has been shown to bend membranes of negatively charged phospholipid vesicles and form tubules from large lipid vesicles. Using cryo-EM it was shown that these are micellar tubes of ~5-6 nm diameter. Alpha-synuclein has also been shown to form lipid disc-like particles similar to apolipoproteins. EPR studies have shown that the structure of alpha synuclein is dependent on the binding surface. The protein adopts a broken-helical conformation on lipoprotein particles while it forms an extended helical structure on lipid vesicles and membrane tubes. Studies have also suggested a possible antioxidant activity of alpha-synuclein in the membrane.

Photomicrographs of regions of substantia nigra in a patient showing Lewy bodies and Lewy neurites in various magnifications

Membrane interaction of alpha-synuclein modulates or affects its rate of aggregation. The membrane-mediated modulation of aggregation is very similar to that observed for other amyloid proteins such as IAPP and abeta. Aggregated states of alpha-synuclein permeate the membrane of lipid vesicles. They are formed upon interaction with peroxidation-prone polyunsaturated fatty acids (PUFA) but not with monounsaturated fatty acids and the binding of lipid autoxidation-promoting transition metals such as iron or copper provokes oligomerization of alpha-synuclein. The aggregated alpha-synuclein has a specific activity for peroxidized lipids and induces lipid autoxidation in PUFA-rich membranes of both neurons and astrocytes, decreasing resistance to apoptosis. Lipid autoxidation is inhibited if the cells are pre-incubated with isotope-reinforced PUFAs (D-PUFA).

== Function ==
Although the function of alpha-synuclein is not well understood, studies suggest that it plays a role in restricting the mobility of synaptic vesicles, consequently attenuating synaptic vesicle recycling and neurotransmitter release. An alternate view is that alpha-synuclein binds to VAMP2 (a synaptobrevin) and stabilizes SNARE complexes; though recent studies indicate that alpha-synuclein–VAMP2 binding is critical for alpha-synuclein-mediated attenuation of synaptic vesicle recycling, connecting the two seemingly divergent views. It may also help regulate the release of dopamine, a type of neurotransmitter that is critical for controlling the start and stop of voluntary and involuntary movements.

Alpha-synuclein modulates DNA repair processes, including repair of double-strand breaks (DSBs). DNA damage response markers co-localize with alpha-synuclein to form discrete foci in human cells and mouse brain. Depletion of alpha-synuclein in human cells causes increased introduction of DNA DSBs after exposure to bleomycin and reduced ability to repair these DSBs. In addition, alpha-synuclein knockout mice display a higher level of DSBs, and this problem can be alleviated by transgenic reintroduction of human alpha-synuclein. Alpha-synuclein promotes the DSB repair pathway referred to as non-homologous end joining. The DNA repair function of alpha-synuclein appears to be compromised in Lewy body inclusion bearing neurons, and this may trigger cell death.

=== Proneurogenic function of alpha-synuclein ===
In some neurodegenerative diseases, alpha-synuclein produces insoluble inclusion bodies. These diseases, known as synucleinopathies, are connected with either higher levels of normal alpha-synuclein or its mutant variants. The normal physiological role of Snca, however, has not yet been thoroughly explained. In fact, physiological Snca has been demonstrated to have a neuroprotective impact by inhibiting apoptosis induced by several types of apoptotic stimuli, or by regulating the expression of proteins involved in apoptotic pathways. Recently it has been demonstrated that up-regulation of alpha-synuclein in the dentate gyrus (a neurogenic niche where new neurons are generated throughout life) activates stem cells, in a model of premature neural aging. This model shows reduced expression of alpha-synuclein and reduced proliferation of stem cells, as is physiologically observed during aging. Exogenous alpha-synuclein in the dentate gyrus is able to rescue this defect. Moreover, alpha-synuclein also boosts the proliferation of dentate gyrus progenitor neural cells in wild-type young mice. Thus, alpha-synuclein represents an effector for neural stem and progenitor cell activation. Similarly, alpha-synuclein has been found to be required to maintain stem cells of the subventricular zone another neurogenic niche, in a cycling state.

== Sequence ==
Alpha-synuclein primary structure is usually divided in three distinct domains:

- Residues 1-60: An amphipathic N-terminal region dominated by four 11-residue repeats including the consensus sequence KTKEGV. This sequence has a structural alpha helix propensity similar to apolipoproteins-binding domains. It is a highly conserved terminal that interacts with acidic lipid membranes, and all the discovered point mutations of the SNCA gene are located within this terminal.
- Residues 61-95: A central hydrophobic region which includes the non-amyloid-β component (NAC) region, involved in protein aggregation. This domain is unique to alpha-synuclein among the synuclein family.
- Residues 96-140: a highly acidic and proline-rich region which has no distinct structural propensity. This domain plays an important role in the function, solubility and interaction of alpha-synuclein with other proteins.

== Autoproteolytic activity ==
The use of high-resolution ion-mobility mass spectrometry (IMS-MS) on HPLC-purified alpha-synuclein in vitro has shown alpha-synuclein to be autoproteolytic (self-proteolytic), generating a variety of small molecular weight fragments upon incubation. The 14.46 kDa protein was found to generate numerous smaller fragments, including 12.16 kDa (amino acids 14–133) and 10.44 kDa (40–140) fragments formed through C- and N-terminal truncation and a 7.27 kDa C-terminal fragment (72–140). The 7.27 kDa fragment, which contains the majority of the NAC region, aggregated considerably faster than full-length alpha-synuclein. It is possible that these autoproteolytic products play a role as intermediates or cofactors in the aggregation of alpha-synuclein in vivo.

== Clinical significance ==
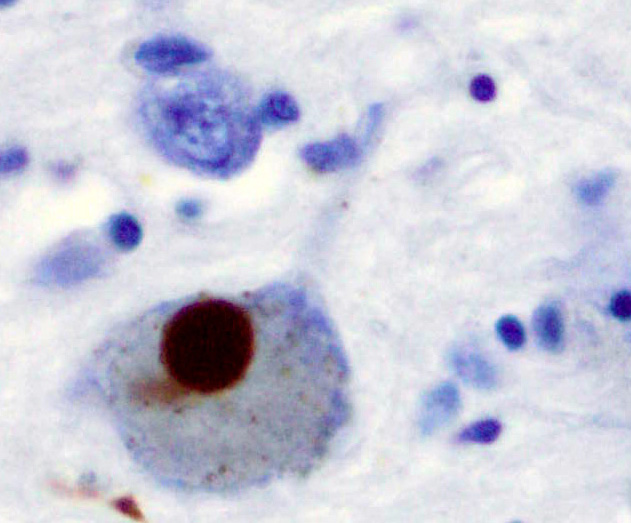
Positive α-Synuclein staining of a Lewy body from a patient who had Parkinson's disease.

Alpha synuclein, having no single, well-defined tertiary structure, is an intrinsically disordered protein, with a pI value of 4.7, which, under certain pathological conditions, can misfold in a way that exposes its core hydrophobic residues to the intracellular milieu, thus providing the opportunity for hydrophobic interactions to occur with a similar, equally exposed protein. This could lead to self assembly and subsequent aggregation into large, insoluble fibrils known as amyloids. The conversion of soluble alpha synuclein into highly ordered, cross-β sheet, fibrillar structures does not, as previously thought, follow a two-step mechanism, rather, occurs through a series of transient, soluble oligomeric intermediates. In 2011, two groups published their findings that unmutated α-synuclein forms a stably folded tetramer that resists aggregation, asserting that this folded tetramer represented the relevant in vivo structure in cells, thereby relieving alpha synuclein of its disordered status. Proponents of the tetramer hypothesis argued that in vivo cross-linking in bacteria, primary neurons and human erythroleukemia cells confirmed the presence of labile, tetrameric species. However, despite numerous in-cell NMR reports demonstrating that alpha synuclein is indeed monomeric and disordered in intact E. coli cells, it is still a matter of debate in the field despite an ever growing mountain of conflicting reports. Nevertheless, alpha-synuclein aggregates to form insoluble fibrils in pathological conditions characterized by Lewy bodies, such as Parkinson's disease, dementia with Lewy bodies and multiple system atrophy. These disorders are known as synucleinopathies. In vitro models of synucleinopathies revealed that aggregation of alpha-synuclein may lead to various cellular disorders including microtubule impairment, synaptic and mitochondrial dysfunctions, oxidative stress as well as dysregulation of Calcium signaling, proteasomal and lysosomal pathway. Alpha-synuclein is the primary structural component of Lewy body fibrils. Occasionally, Lewy bodies contain tau protein; however, alpha-synuclein and tau constitute two distinctive subsets of filaments in the same inclusion bodies. Alpha-synuclein pathology is also found in both sporadic and familial cases with Alzheimer's disease. The alpha-synuclein seed amplification assay (SAA) using cerebrospinal fluid demonstrated high diagnostic performance in distinguishing synucleinopathies with Lewy bodies from control subjects. Additionally, SAA kinetics are associated with cognitive impairment and predict the development of dementia.

The aggregation mechanism of alpha-synuclein is uncertain. There is evidence of a structured intermediate rich in beta structure that can be the precursor of aggregation and, ultimately, Lewy bodies. A single molecule study in 2008 suggests alpha-synuclein exists as a mix of unstructured, alpha-helix, and beta-sheet-rich conformers in equilibrium. Mutations or buffer conditions known to improve aggregation strongly increase the population of the beta conformer, thus suggesting this could be a conformation related to pathogenic aggregation. One theory is that the majority of alpha-synuclein aggregates are located in the presynapse as smaller deposits which causes synaptic dysfunction. Among the strategies for treating synucleinopathies are compounds that inhibit aggregation of alpha-synuclein. It has been shown that the small molecule cuminaldehyde inhibits fibrillation of alpha-synuclein. The Epstein-Barr virus has been implicated in these disorders.

In rare cases of familial forms of Parkinson's disease, there is a mutation in the gene coding for alpha-synuclein. Five point mutations have been identified thus far: A53T, A30P, E46K, H50Q, and G51D; however, in total, nineteen mutations in the SNCA gene have been associated with parkinsonism: A18T, A29S, A53E, A53V, E57A, V15A, T72M, L8I, V15D, M127I, P117S, M5T, G93A, E83Q, and A30G.

It has been reported that some mutations influence the initiation and amplification steps of the aggregation process. Genomic duplication and triplication of the gene appear to be a rare cause of Parkinson's disease in other lineages, although more common than point mutations. Hence certain mutations of alpha-synuclein may cause it to form amyloid-like fibrils that contribute to Parkinson's disease. Over-expression of human wild-type or A53T-mutant alpha-synuclein in primates drives deposition of alpha-synuclein in the ventral midbrain, degeneration of the dopaminergic system and impaired motor performance. Although the accumulation and aggregation of alpha-synuclein in most Parkinson's disease patients primarily result from posttranscriptional mechanisms, targeting its production remains a potential therapeutic approach. Research indicates that microRNA-7 and the naturally occurring small molecule quercetin can reduce alpha-synuclein levels under experimental conditions.

Certain sections of the alpha-synuclein protein may play a role in the tauopathies.

In children with autism spectrum disorders, the serum levels of alpha-synuclein have been reported to be significantly higher. A correlation to higher levels of e.coli and pro-inflammatory gut microbiome in those patients and an approach through disease modifying polysaccharides has been reported in clinical pilot studies.

A prion form of the protein alpha-synuclein may be a causal agent for the disease multiple system atrophy.

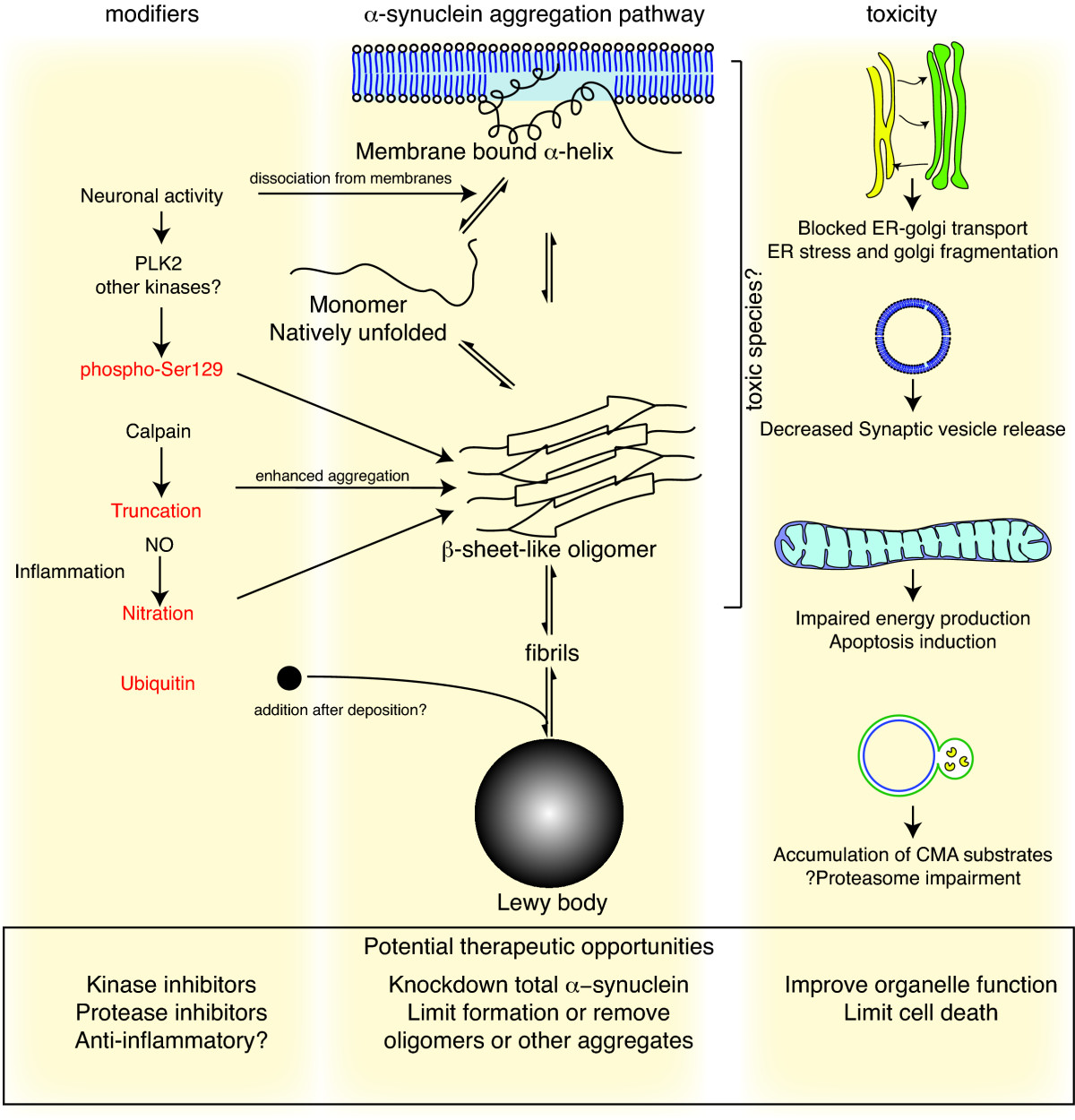
Events in α-synuclein toxicity.

Self-replicating "prion-like" amyloid assemblies of alpha-synuclein have been described that are invisible to the amyloid dye Thioflavin T and that can acutely spread in neurons in vitro and in vivo.

Antibodies against alpha-synuclein have replaced antibodies against ubiquitin as the gold standard for immunostaining of Lewy bodies. The central panel in the figure to the right shows the major pathway for protein aggregation. Monomeric α-synuclein is natively unfolded in solution but can also bind to membranes in an α-helical form. It seems likely that these two species exist in equilibrium within the cell, although this is unproven. From in vitro work, it is clear that unfolded monomer can aggregate first into small oligomeric species that can be stabilized by β-sheet-like interactions and then into higher molecular weight insoluble fibrils. In a cellular context, there is some evidence that the presence of lipids can promote oligomer formation: α-synuclein can also form annular, pore-like structures that interact with membranes, allowing small molecules to be translocated from one side of the membrane to the other through the hollow oligomer. The deposition of α-synuclein into pathological structures such as Lewy bodies is probably a late event that occurs in some neurons. On the left hand side are some of the known modifiers of this process. Electrical activity in neurons changes the association of α-synuclein with vesicles and may also stimulate polo-like kinase 2 (PLK2), which has been shown to phosphorylate α-synuclein at Ser129. Other kinases have also been proposed to be involved. As well as phosphorylation, truncation through proteases such as calpains, and nitration, probably through nitric oxide (NO) or other reactive nitrogen species that are present during inflammation, all modify synuclein such that it has a higher tendency to aggregate. The addition of ubiquitin (shown as a black spot) to Lewy bodies is probably a secondary process to deposition. On the right are some of the proposed cellular targets for α-synuclein mediated toxicity, which include (from top to bottom) ER-golgi transport, synaptic vesicles, mitochondria and lysosomes and other proteolytic machinery. In each of these cases, it is proposed that α-synuclein has detrimental effects, listed below each arrow, although at this time it is not clear if any of these are either necessary or sufficient for toxicity in neurons.

== Protein-protein interactions ==
Alpha-synuclein has been shown to interact with

- Dopamine transporter,
- Parkin (ligase),
- Phospholipase D1,
- SNCAIP,
- Tau protein.
- Beta amyloid

== See also ==
- Synuclein
- Contursi Terme - the village in Italy where a mutation in the α-synuclein gene led to a family history of Parkinson's disease
- Anti-α-synuclein drug
