= George H. W. Bush vomiting incident =

1992 incident in Japan

CNN master tape video frame depicting President George H. W. Bush vomiting on Japanese Prime Minister Kiichi Miyazawa

While attending a banquet hosted by Prime Minister of Japan Kiichi Miyazawa on January 8, 1992, President of the United States George H. W. Bush fainted after vomiting onto Miyazawa's lap at around 20:20 JST. The incident took place at the Naikaku Sōri Daijin Kōtei in Tokyo, the Prime Minister's personal residential quarters. Doctors later attributed the incident to a case of acute gastroenteritis.

== Background ==
George H.W. Bush marked the New Year of 1992 with a twelve-day trip to Asia and the Pacific to discuss the United States' post-Cold War readjustment of economic relations and policies. On January 8, 1992, he and U.S. ambassador to Japan Michael Armacost played a doubles tennis match against Emperor of Japan Akihito and his son, Crown Prince Naruhito; the emperor and crown prince won.

== Incident ==
That evening, Bush attended a state event for 135 diplomats held at the Japanese Prime Minister's residence. Between the second and third courses, Bush, who had been scheduled to give remarks at the dinner, fainted in his chair while vomiting onto Miyazawa's trousers. First Lady Barbara Bush held a napkin to her husband's mouth until the United States Secret Service took over. While still on the floor, Bush quipped to his personal physician, Burton J. Lee III: "Roll me under the table until the dinner's over." He assured dinner guests he had "influenza" and left for the evening. Barbara Bush later gave a speech in President Bush's place where she affectionately teased Armacost over the tennis game, joking that defeat was something the Bush family was not used to.

The following day, January 9, spokesman Marlin Fitzwater said Bush had a mild case of gastroenteritis and was feeling fine. That afternoon, Bush held a news conference with Akihito at the Akasaka Palace.

== Aftermath ==
The incident was widely reported, coming just weeks before the beginning of the 1992 Republican Party presidential primaries, and became fodder for the nation's comedians. Footage of the President vomiting was broadcast on the ABC network. The incident was parodied by Saturday Night Live in a mockumentary sketch reminiscent of documentaries covering the John F. Kennedy assassination and the 1991 film JFK, in which Barbara Bush tries to escape the banquet by crawling across the table in a manner similar to how then-First Lady Jacqueline Kennedy Onassis crawled out of the limousine in which her husband was shot.

Shortly after the incident, an Idaho man named James Edward Smith called CNN posing as the president's physician, claiming Bush had died. A CNN employee entered the information into a centralized computer used by both CNN and its sister network CNN Headline News, and Headline News nearly aired it before it could be verified. Smith was subsequently questioned by the Secret Service and hospitalized at a private mental health facility for psychiatric evaluation.

In Japan, Bush was remembered for this event for several years. According to the Encyclopedia of Political Communication, "The incident caused a wave of late-night television jokes and ridicule in the international community, even coining Bushu-suru (ブッシュする) which means 'to pull a Bush'".

In 2008, when asked about his infamous tank photograph, Michael Dukakis (Bush's opponent in the 1988 United States presidential election) said: "Should I have been in the tank? Probably not, in retrospect. But these days when people ask me, 'Did you get here in a tank?' I always respond by saying, 'No, and I've never thrown up all over the Japanese prime minister'."

== In popular culture ==
- The incident was parodied on the "Player's Club" episode of the sketch comedy show In Living Color, with Jim Carrey as Bush.
- The incident is spoofed in the 1993 comedy film Hot Shots! Part Deux.
- In The Simpsons episode "Two Bad Neighbors", Bush states to Homer Simpson, "I'll ruin you like a Japanese banquet."

== See also ==
- Foreign policy of the George H. W. Bush administration
- Japan-United States relations
