= The White House Doctor =

2010 book by Connie Mariano

- Book cover for Connie Mariano's The White House Doctor.
- Author: Connie Mariano
- Language: English
- Genre: Autobiography
- Publisher: Thomas Dunne Books
- Publication date: June 22, 2010
- Publication place: United States
- ISBN: 0-312-53483-3

The White House Doctor: My Patients Were Presidents – A Memoir is a book authored by Connie Mariano, the first military woman in the history of the United States to be appointed as Physician to the President, the first female director of the medical unit of the White House, and the first Filipino-American to become a rear admiral in the US Navy. With a foreword from Bill Clinton, the autobiographical book takes a look at the personal lives of three American Presidents (George H. W. Bush, Bill Clinton, and George W. Bush) and three American First Ladies (Barbara Bush, Hillary Clinton, and Laura Bush) she had taken care of while working as a White House physician. It was described as a "fascinating look into what goes on behind closed doors at 1600 Pennsylvania Avenue".
