= Richard Tubb =

United States Air Force general

Brigadier General Richard Tubb
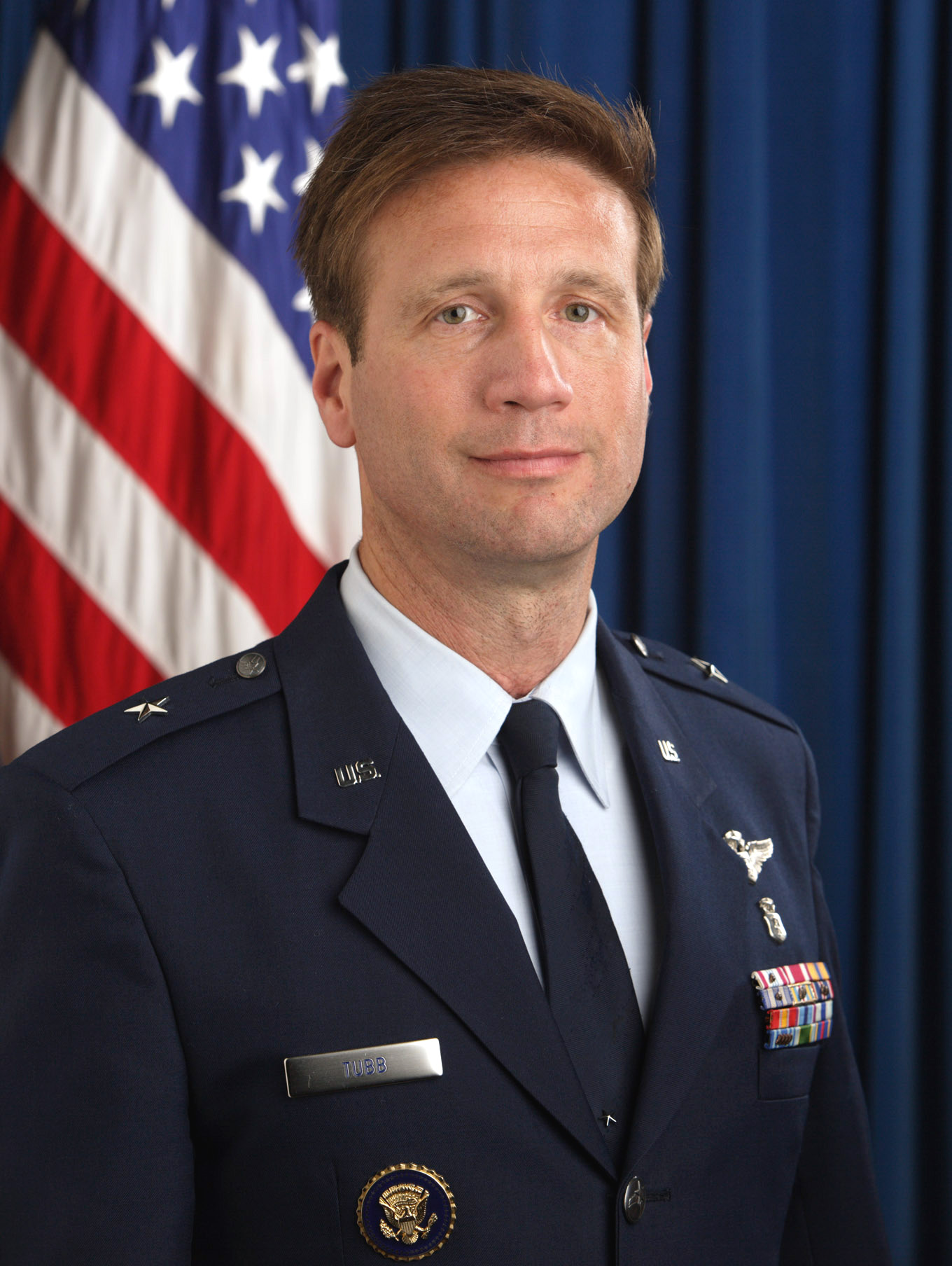
- Official portrait, 2006

Physician to the President
- In office March 9, 2002 – January 20, 2009
- President: George W. Bush
- Preceded by: Eleanor Mariano
- Succeeded by: Jeffrey Kuhlman

Personal details
- Born: Richard Jay Tubb; July 21, 1959 (age 67)
- Spouse: Kathryn Diane Hillman
- Education: United States Air Force Academy (BS); University of Wisconsin (MD)

Military service
- Allegiance: United States
- Branch/service: United States Air Force
- Years of service: 1981–2010
- Rank: Brigadier General
- Awards: Defense Meritorious Service Medal (2); Meritorious Service Medal; Air Force Commendation Medal; Air Force Achievement Medal (2); Joint Meritorious Unit Award (3); Air Force Outstanding Unit Award (2)

Richard Jay Tubb (born July 21, 1959) was the personal physician to President George W. Bush as well as being personal physician to Vice President Al Gore during the Clinton Administration. He was a brigadier general in the United States Air Force. His predecessor as White House Physician was Eleanor Mariano; Navy Captain Jeffrey Kuhlman succeeded him as Physician to the President.

Tubb may be the longest serving White House Physician in U.S. history. He was assigned to the White House Medical Unit for nearly 14 years and served in three presidential administrations from 1995 until 2009. As White House Physician, he was a Deputy Assistant to the President and Director of the White House Medical Unit, a component of the White House Military Office, that is part of the Executive Office of the President.

On January 28, 2013, Tubb was appointed a Non-Executive Director of British American Tobacco p.l.c.

Military offices
Preceded by Eleanor Mariano	Physician to the President; 2002–2009	Succeeded by Jeffrey Kuhlman
