= Chief Medical Advisor to the President =

United States federal government office

The chief medical advisor to the president was a position within the White House Office, which is part of the Executive Office of the President of the United States. Established in 2019, the position has been vacant since December 31, 2022, when Anthony Fauci stepped down.

== History ==
The position was established in 2019 by the first Trump administration. On February 2, 2019, former physician to the president Ronny Jackson was selected to serve as chief medical advisor and assistant to President Donald Trump. Jackson's job included advising Trump on public health policy. Jackson left at the end of 2019, and the Trump administration did not name a successor.

On December 4, 2020, the transition team of the incoming Biden administration announced that Anthony Fauci, then the director of the National Institute of Allergy and Infectious Diseases, would serve in the role. Fauci stepped into the job on January 21, 2021, the day after Biden took office. Fauci advised on public health policy related to the COVID-19 pandemic. In December 2022, Fauci stepped down from his position as announced four months earlier.

== Chief medical advisors ==
No.	Officeholder	Portrait	Term start	Term end	President
1	Ronny Jackson		February 2, 2019	December 1, 2019	Donald Trump
Vacant; December 1, 2019 – January 20, 2021 (1 year, 50 days)					Donald Trump
2	Anthony Fauci		January 20, 2021	December 31, 2022	Joe Biden
Vacant; December 31, 2022 – present (3 years, 314 days)
