= Burton J. Lee III =

American physician and oncologist (1930–2016)

Burton J. Lee III MD
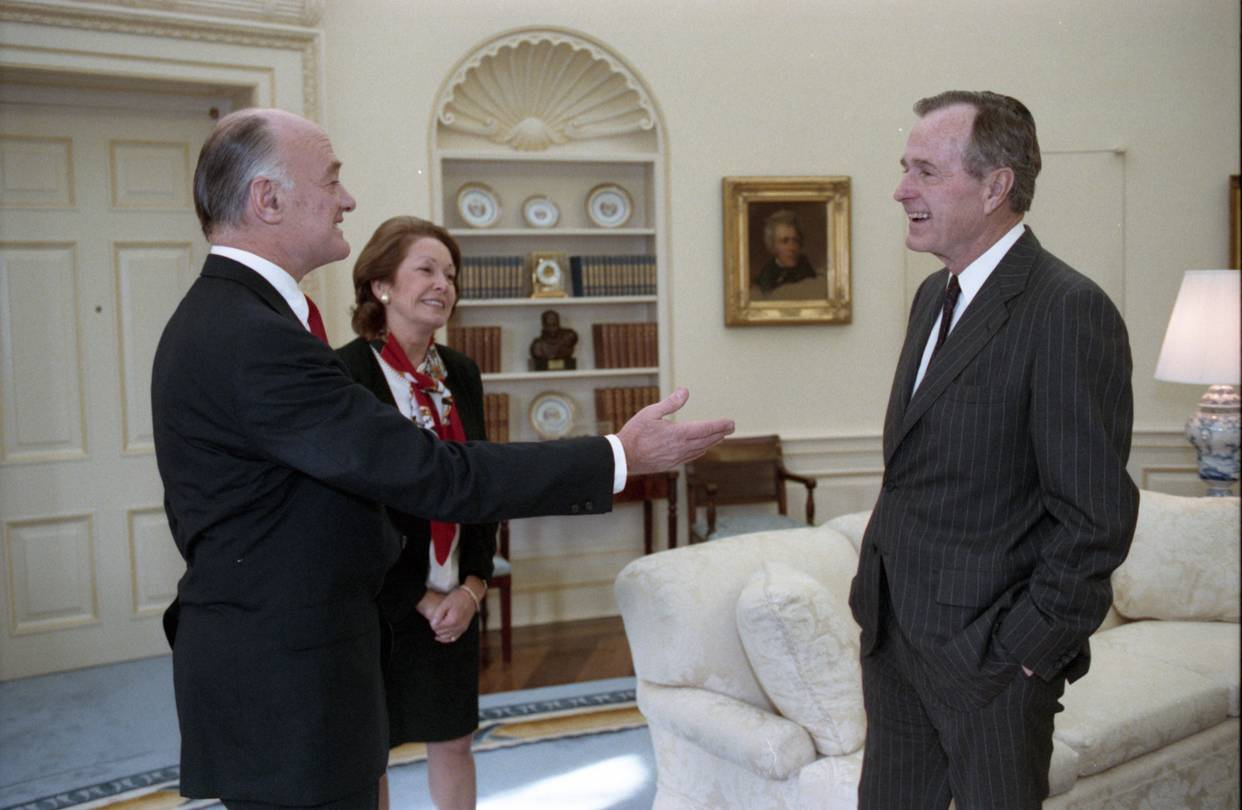
- Lee (left) with George H. W. Bush

Physician to the President
- In office March 8, 1989 – January 28, 1993 Serving with Lawrence C. Mohr, Jr.
- President: George H. W. Bush
- Preceded by: Lawrence C. Mohr, Jr. (served concurrently with Lee)
- Succeeded by: Eleanor Mariano

Personal details
- Born: Burton James Lee III; March 28, 1930 Manhattan, New York, U.S.
- Died: November 25, 2016 (aged 86) Vero Beach, Florida, U.S.
- Education: Yale University; Columbia University (MD)
- Occupation: Physician

Burton James Lee III (March 28, 1930 – November 25, 2016) was a physician and oncologist who was Physician to the President under President George H. W. Bush and Bill Clinton. He also served on the President's Commission on the HIV Epidemic.

== Early life and education ==
Burton James Lee III was born on March 28, 1930, in Manhattan, New York City, New York, to Burton J. Lee II and his wife, the former Rosamond Saltonstall Auchincloss. He and his twin sister, Rosamond Saltonstall Lee, were the eldest of four children born to the couple. His other siblings were Susannah (born 1932) and Mary Josephine (born 1937). His parents, who wed in New York City on June 20, 1929, were important members of high society. His father was a banker, and his mother a member of one of the most prominent families of New England. His paternal grandfather, Burton James Lee, had been an oncologist and the first clinical director at Memorial Sloan Kettering Cancer Center after its relocation. His childhood idol was his maternal grandfather, Charles Auchincloss.

As a youth, Lee attended the Buckley School on New York City's Upper East Side, and then graduated from Phillips Academy in Andover, Massachusetts. He entered Yale University, where he received his bachelor's degree in 1952. While at Yale, he became close friends with Jonathan Bush, George H. W. Bush's younger brother, and with Nicholas F. Brady, the future Secretary of the Treasury under George H. W. Bush. This led to a close friendship with George H. W. Bush. He received his M.D. from Columbia University College of Physicians and Surgeons in 1956. Lee interned at Bellevue Hospital in New York City.

About 1945 or 1946, Rosamond and Burton Lee, Jr. divorced. Rosamond married Thomas Campbell Plowden-Wardlaw, a prominent New York attorney, on July 2, 1954, and died on November 4, 1971.

Burton Lee, Jr. married Margaret DeWolf Erskine on January 11, 1947. The couple had four children (Jared E., Timothy M., Marion Rogers, and Cecelia DeWolf), leaving Lee a large, extended family of seven siblings. Burton J. Lee, Jr. died suddenly of a heart attack in July 1962, while step-mother Margaret Erskine Lee died in 2005.

== Career ==
Lee joined the medical staff at Memorial Sloan-Kettering Cancer Center in 1960. In 1961, Lee enlisted in the U.S. Army Medical Corps, and served for two years in West Germany. Leaving the Army in 1963, he volunteered for Medico International, and spent time in Algeria administering to refugees, people injured in the country's civil war, and victims of torture. Returning to the United States, Lee rejoined the staff at Memorial Sloan Kettering Cancer Center, where he worked as an oncologist and chemotherapist. He took a special interest in treating patients with Hodgkin's lymphoma, leukemia, and lymphoma, and oversaw the treatment of more than 1,500 patients. By 1989, he had risen to become senior attending physician at the Hospital for Allied Diseases at Memorial Sloan-Kettering. Lee became well known for having unorthodox views on Hodgkin's disease. He argued that while the cancer could be put into remission, the cause of the illness was poorly understood and the damage to the immune system remained untreated. His views were so controversial that Memorial Sloan-Kettering officials barred him from talking to the National Cancer Institute for 10 years.

Lee was a prolific author, having contributed to or solely-authored more than 120 articles and medical books by 1989. In the fall of 1988, Lee published an editorial in the Journal of the American Medical Association in which he attacked the medical profession for putting greed ahead of patients by ordering too many tests. He also accused physicians of neglecting patient care while using patients for research, and advocated changes to medical practice laws to allow physician assistants and registered nurses to perform some medical procedures and assessments currently prohibited to them. The article was widely debated within the profession, and generated a back-and-forth discussion in the journal's letters page between Lee and his critics.

=== 1987 AIDS commission ===
On July 23, 1987, through his connections with then-Vice President Bush, Lee was appointed by President Ronald Reagan to the President's Commission on the HIV Epidemic. Lee himself said that, as the panel's only practicing physician, "I was going to die before I let that commission fail..." Lee personally reviewed much of the medical literature on HIV and AIDS, and insisted that the commission visit AIDS patients in hospitals and hospices. Aware of how cancer patients are often discriminated against, Lee was greatly disturbed by the much greater discrimination AIDS patients faced. He was particularly moved by the plight of Ryan White, a boy who became infected with HIV while receiving treatment for his hemophilia. Dr. Frank Lilly, a geneticist and openly gay member of the commission, described Lee as a "receptive learner" on HIV and AIDS issues, even though his only experience with AIDS had been the treatment of HIV-infected individuals who had cancer, and commission executive director Polly Gault said Lee played a critical role in overcoming divisions among commission members and in drafting its final report. Lee cast the critical vote in approving the commission's report, which passed 7-to-6.

Lee was widely viewed as helping to turn the commission away from being a rubber stamp for anti-gay conservative views and toward championing improved research on HIV/AIDS and treatment of AIDS patients. Lee later credited the militant HIV/AIDS group ACT UP with making many positive contributions to the commission's work.

=== Physician to the president ===
Through his friendships with Jonathan Bush and Nicholas F. Brady, Lee became a close friend of George H. W. Bush. Lee's stepdaughter and Bush's daughter, Dorothy, were roommates at Boston College.

Elected president of the United States in 1988, George H. W. Bush considered appointing Lee to be Surgeon General of the United States, but Lee's support for abortion rights was incompatible with Bush's position and he was not nominated for the position. Bush also considered Lee for the role of Special Assistant to the President for Health Policy, but once more Lee's abortion views cost him the job. Lee was also under consideration for the position of Commissioner of Food and Drugs after the Bush administration became dissatisfied with Food and Drug Administrator Dr. Frank Young. But Bush chose Dr. David A. Kessler for the position instead.

President Bush appointed Lee to be Physician to the President on March 8, 1989. Colleagues counseled him against taking the position, noting that many previous Physicians to the President had been pressured into keeping presidential illnesses a secret, damaging their reputations as doctors. Lee, however, told Bush that he would resign if told to conceal a serious medical issue. Lee subsequently attended an April 1989 meeting at which Bush and Vice President Dan Quayle discussed the conditions under which Bush might invoke the 25th Amendment.

Lee oversaw a staff of 16 (which included four physicians) while director of the White House Medical Unit. Lee was assisted by Colonel Lawrence C. Mohr, Jr., MD (a United States Army expert in emergency care) in providing White House healthcare. Lee had a close doctor-patient relationship with President Bush and First Lady Barbara Bush, and Lee and his wife often spent weekends with the Bushes at Camp David. Beginning in 1989, Lee prescribed the powerful drug Halcion to help President Bush sleep while traveling. Lee said Bush took the drug "rarely" over the next three years, but even so Lee's prescription of the drug was controversial. Lee's April 1990 report on President Bush's health was overwhelmingly positive. But in 1991, Bush was hospitalized for three days for shortness of breath he experienced while jogging. Lee diagnosed Bush with Graves' disease, an autoimmune disease that affects the thyroid and which had caused Bush to have an irregular heartbeat. Lee was criticized for not diagnosing the disease earlier. Lee also treated Bush for intestinal flu after the president vomited and collapsed during a dinner at the home of the Japanese Prime Minister Kiichi Miyazawa in January 1992. Bush had ignored Lee's advice to skip the dinner. Lee was criticized by a number of American physicians for the treatment Lee administered, with several arguing the president should have been hospitalized.

Lee also served as an informal advisor to Bush on a wide range of health policy issues. Lee and Bush spoke on the telephone on an almost daily basis about a wide range of health topics. When Bush solicited Lee's advice about specific policy issues, Lee would reply with a written memorandum. The Washington Post quoted unnamed White House insiders as saying that Lee's policy views were "inconsequential" and that Lee was "out of the loop". Lee was active on HIV and AIDS issues throughout the Bush administration. Lee was able to convince Bush to appoint an HIV-infected individual to the National Commission on AIDS. Lee met with a delegation of AIDS activists in the summer of 1989, and agreed to promote journalist Belinda Mason, who had become infected with HIV while receiving blood transfusions during the birth of a child. Mason later said Lee was surprised when Bush appointed her to the commission. The news media said that AIDS activists believe it was Lee who convinced Bush to make a March 29, 1989, speech condemning discrimination against people with HIV and AIDS, and that Lee helped make the HIV/AIDS nondiscrimination provisions of the Americans With Disabilities Act palatable to the administration. Lee also helped lobby for an end to immigration laws barring individuals with HIV/AIDS from visiting the United States, and he often accompanied First Lady Barbara Bush when she visited children and young adults with AIDS. Lee had serious disagreements with John H. Sununu, Bush's White House Chief of Staff, over a wide range of health policy issues which news media attributed to Lee's low level of influence on administration policy. In November 1989, Bush appointed Lee to the newly created Presidential Drug Advisory Council, whose mission was to advise the President of the United States on ways to combat illegal drugs.

Bill Clinton defeated George H. W. Bush in the U.S. presidential election of 1992. Lee agreed to stay on as Physician to the President, supervising Clinton's medical care, until Clinton appointed a new physician. Lee was abruptly fired on January 28, 1993, before a new physician had been named after he refused to inject the president with an unknown medication. Lee was told the medication was for Clinton's allergies, but no records verifying the contents of the vial could be produced. (Note: Clinton's allergist in Arkansas, Dr. Kelsy J. Caplinger, later verified that the vial did, in fact, contain allergy medication. Caplinger did not follow normal procedure in writing a physician's note about the vial, as he believed that a direct hand-off to Clinton's staff ensured the content's security and identification. The New York Times reported that Lee acted in accordance with standard medical procedures.)

=== Post-White House work ===
After leaving the White House, Lee moved to Greenville, South Carolina, where he became administrator of the Greenville Health System and established the system's first comprehensive cancer treatment program. In the late 1990s, he moved to Boston, Massachusetts, where he was a member of the board of directors of the Marine Biological Laboratory.

Lee retired and lived briefly on Martha's Vineyard, Massachusetts, before moving to Vero Beach, Florida. He served as chairman of the Indian River County Hospital District, and on the board of directors of the Whole Family Health Center. He also co-founded Alcohope, a nonprofit alcohol recovery center.

In 2005, Lee authored an editorial in The Washington Post in which he condemned military medical personnel who participated in the torture of individuals taken prisoner during the war on terror.

== Personal life and death ==
Lee married Pauline Herzog in 1953. Their marriage ended in divorce. The couple had three children: Chip, Jackie, and Roz. Lee then married Ann Kelly, and was step-father to her three children from her first marriage: Debbie, Wendy, and Leigh.

Lee died of bladder cancer at his home in Vero Beach on November 25, 2016, aged 86.

Military offices
Preceded by Lawrence C. Mohr, Jr.	Physician to the President; 1989–1993	Succeeded by Eleanor Mariano
