= Ronny Jackson =

American physician and politician (born 1967)

- Official portrait, 2025

Member of the U.S. House of Representatives from Texas's 13th district
- Incumbent
- Assumed office January 3, 2021
- Preceded by: Mac Thornberry

1st Chief Medical Advisor to the President
- In office February 2, 2019 – December 1, 2019
- President: Donald Trump
- Preceded by: Position established
- Succeeded by: Anthony Fauci

Physician to the President
- In office July 25, 2013 – March 28, 2018
- President: Barack Obama; Donald Trump
- Preceded by: Jeffrey Kuhlman
- Succeeded by: Sean Conley

Personal details
- Born: Ronny Lynn Jackson; May 4, 1967 (age 59) Levelland, Texas, U.S.
- Party: Republican
- Spouse: Jane Ely
- Children: 3
- Education: South Plains College (AS); Texas A&M University, Galveston (BS); University of Texas Medical Branch (MD)
- Website: House website Campaign website

Military service
- Branch/service: United States Navy
- Years of service: 1995–2019
- Rank: Rear admiral (lower half) (Note: Jackson retired as a rear admiral (lower half) in 2019, but his rank was subsequently reduced to captain by the Navy in 2022, after an investigation by the Department of Defense Office of Inspector General substantiated allegations of misconduct against Jackson. Though the demotion was retroactive, it was entered into Jackson's official service record and reduced the amount he was entitled to collect in annual pension payouts. In 2025, Navy secretary John Phelan intervened to have Jackson's rank restored.)
- Unit: Medical Corps
- Battles/wars: Iraq War
- Awards: Defense Superior Service Medal; Legion of Merit; Navy and Marine Corps Commendation Medal (4)
- Jackson's voice Jackson on naming the U.S. Post Office building in Canyon, Texas, after rancher Gary Fletcher. Recorded November 14, 2022

Ronny Lynn Jackson (born May 4, 1967) is an American physician, politician, and former United States Navy officer who has served as the U.S. representative for Texas's 13th congressional district since 2021. A member of the Republican Party, his district is based in Amarillo and includes the Texas panhandle and much of northeast Texas, as far as Denton.

Jackson joined the White House Medical Unit in the mid-2000s under George W. Bush, and served as physician to the president from 2013 to 2018 under Barack Obama and Donald Trump.

In March 2018, Trump nominated Jackson to be U.S. secretary of veterans affairs to succeed David Shulkin, but Jackson withdrew the following month amid allegations of misconduct and mismanagement during his service in the White House. In February 2019, Trump appointed Jackson assistant to the president and chief medical advisor, a new position in the Executive Office.

Jackson retired from the Navy as a rear admiral (lower half) in December 2019. In 2020, he was elected to the U.S. House of Representatives. In 2021, an investigation by the Defense Department inspector general found that Jackson had engaged in various inappropriate behaviors as an admiral; the following year, the Navy retroactively demoted him to the rank of captain. Jackson continued to represent himself as an admiral until his demotion was brought to light in 2024. In 2025, his rank of rear admiral (lower half) was restored.

== Early life and education ==
Jackson was born to Waymon and Norma Jackson and raised in Levelland, Texas. As a child, he was interested in aquatic activities, including swimming and waterskiing. He has two siblings, Gary and Stacy Jackson, who are both employed in Levelland's Covenant Hospital. He earned an Associate of Science from South Plains College in 1988 and a Bachelor of Science in marine biology from Texas A&M University at Galveston in 1991. He attended medical school at the University of Texas Medical Branch, receiving his Doctor of Medicine in 1995.

== Military career ==
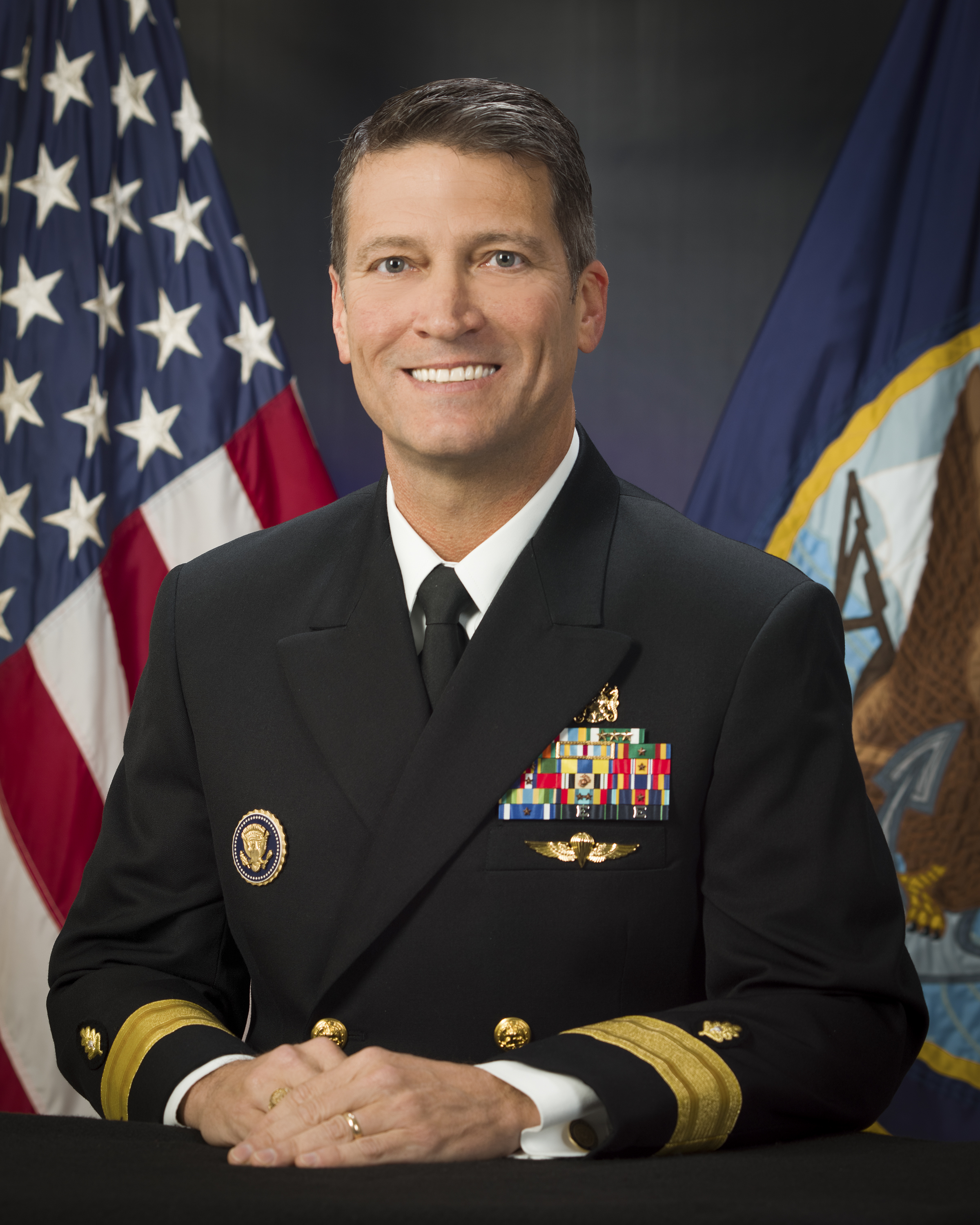
Then-Rear Admiral Ronny Jackson while serving as physician to the President, in October 2016

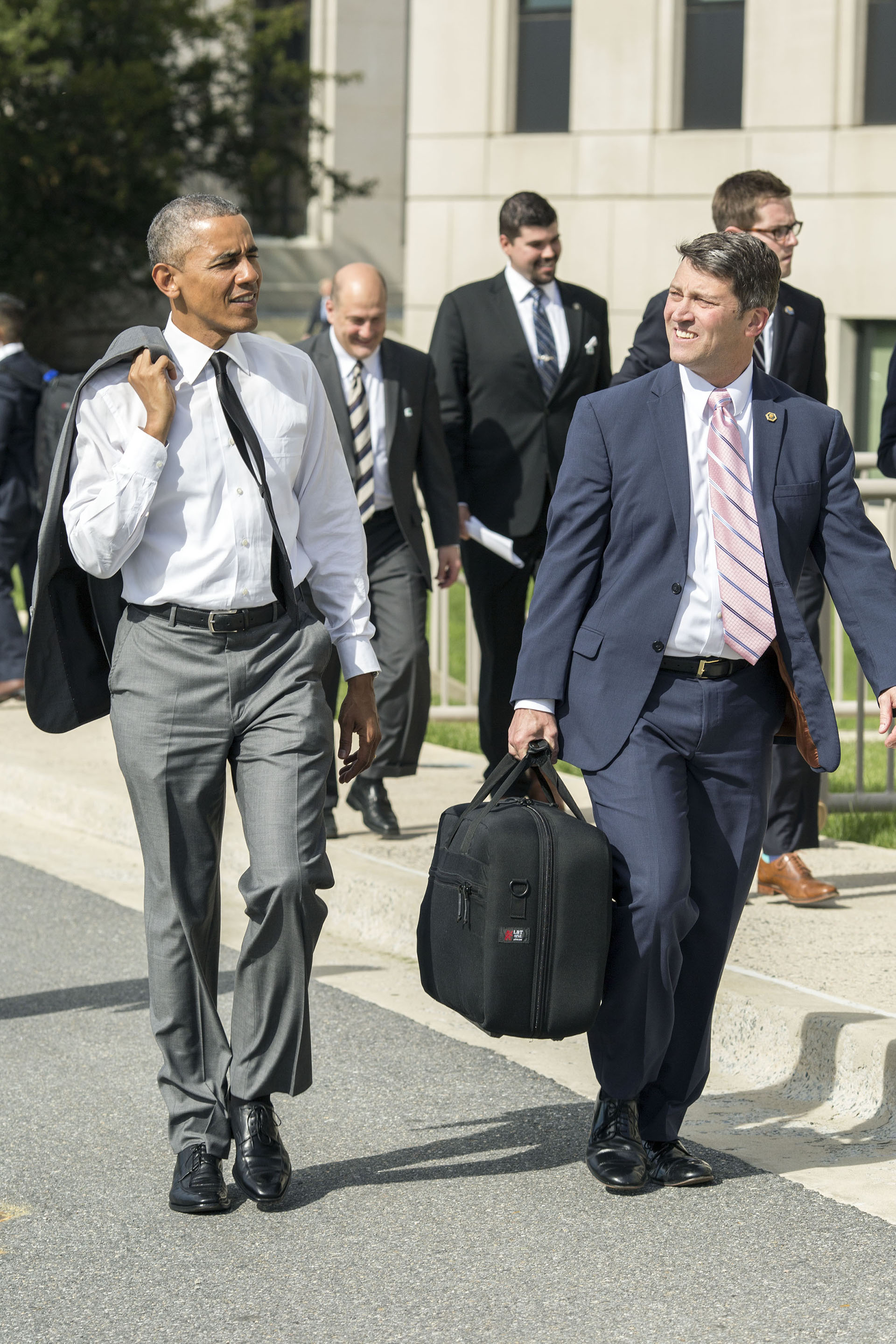
Jackson departs Walter Reed National Military Medical Center with President Barack Obama in 2015

Jackson became a Navy officer after graduating from medical school in 1995. He graduated from the Undersea Medical Officer Program in 1996. Jackson had a series of operational postings, as officer-in-charge and diving medical officer at Explosive Ordnance Disposal Mobile Unit 8 at the naval base in Sigonella, Sicily, and diving safety officer at the Naval Safety Command in Norfolk, Virginia. In 2001, he started a residency in emergency medicine, which he completed in 2004. He was a clinical faculty physician in the Emergency Medical Residency Program at the Naval Medical Center Portsmouth for an additional year before being deployed to Iraq in 2005, where he worked as emergency medicine physician with a surgical shock trauma platoon in Taqaddum.

In June 2006, Jackson became a physician in the White House Medical Unit (WHMU), ultimately working under three presidents. He became WHMU director in May 2010, and in July 2013 was given the additional title of Physician to the President. In December 2014, Jackson's duties as WHMU director ended, but he continued to be Physician to the President. In January 2017, Jackson made headlines after treating a girl who was bitten by Sunny, one of the Obamas' dogs.

After Donald Trump was elected president in 2016, he kept Jackson on as Physician to the President. Upon taking office, Trump gave Jackson the additional title of Deputy Assistant to the President. Jackson became close to Trump after delivering an hourlong press conference in which he gave a glowing assessment of Trump's health, praising Trump's "incredibly good genes" and his performance on a cognitive test ("exceedingly well") and claiming that "if he had a healthier diet over the last 20 years, he might live to be 200 years old." Jackson was criticized for the statements and accused of misstating Trump's height and weight in order to minimize his obesity. Trump appointed Jackson as "Assistant to the President and Chief Medical Advisor" on February 2, 2019.

Jackson held the Navy rank of captain from May 1, 2010, to October 1, 2016, when he was promoted to rear admiral (lower half). Jackson was nominated for promotion to the two-star rank of rear admiral on March 20, 2018, but the Senate Committee on Armed Services returned the nomination to the president on January 3, 2019, without action. He was renominated by Trump for promotion again on January 15, 2019, but it was again returned to the president without action. Jackson retired from the Navy on December 1, 2019, as a rear admiral (lower half).

In July 2022, the Navy demoted Jackson from rear admiral (lower half) to captain for actions "not in keeping with the standards the Navy requires of its leaders", citing "substantiated allegations" in a 2018 investigation by the Defense Department's inspector general into reports that the physician had drunk alcohol while on duty, acted inappropriately, and routinely yelled at subordinates. Despite the demotion, Jackson continued to represent himself as an admiral on his congressional website through at least March 2024, when the story was first uncovered by The Washington Post. On June 13, 2025, John Phelan, the Secretary of the Navy, intervened to reverse Jackson's demotion.

=== Nomination as Secretary of Veterans Affairs (2018) ===
On March 28, 2018, Trump announced that he planned to nominate Jackson to succeed David Shulkin as Secretary of Veterans Affairs. Some senators expressed skepticism of the nomination due to Jackson's lack of management experience. Others noted the allegations about Jackson's conduct, which the administration disputed.

On April 23, the U.S. Senate Committee on Veterans' Affairs postponed a hearing on Jackson's nomination after current and former White House medical staff accused him of creating a hostile work environment, excessive drinking on the job, and dispensing medication improperly. Much of the hearing was handled by Senator Jon Tester (D-Montana), the committee's ranking member, with the support of its chairman, Republican senator Johnny Isakson. While acting as Physician to the President, Jackson earned the nicknames "the candyman" and "Dr. Feelgood" for ignoring medical procedures and dispensing drugs without prescriptions. Tester told CNN on April 24 that Jackson was known as "the candy man" at the White House, according to around 20 people who brought these concerns to the committee, because he allegedly handed out Ambien, Provigil, and other prescription drugs "like they were candy". At a press conference, Trump called Jackson "one of the finest people that I have met", hinted that Jackson might drop out, and accusing Democrats of mounting an unfair attack on his record.

On April 25, CNN reported that during an overseas trip in 2015, an intoxicated Jackson knocked on a female employee's hotel room door so noisily that the Secret Service stopped him to prevent him from waking President Obama. Secret Service officials said they had no record of such an incident.

Jackson withdrew from consideration for Secretary of Veterans Affairs on April 26, 2018, after the Senate Committee on Veterans Affairs began formally investigating the allegations. Senator Johnny Isakson, the Republican chairman of the Veterans Affairs Committee, defended Tester's grilling, saying he had no problem with Tester's handling of Jackson's nomination.

Jackson insisted that the allegations were "completely false and fabricated" and said he was withdrawing because the controversy had become a distraction for Trump and his agenda. Jackson returned to work in the White House Medical Unit but did not return to his position as Trump's personal physician; he was replaced in that position by Navy officer Sean Conley, who had taken over that role a month earlier in an acting capacity. The 115th Congress returned his nomination to Trump on January 3, 2019, without it being considered in the Senate Committee on Armed Services.

=== Inspector General investigation ===
In May 2018, after receiving 12 complaints about Jackson's conduct, the Department of Defense Office of Inspector General (OIG) opened an investigation. The investigation stalled from October 2018 to August 2019 because the Trump White House Counsel's Office objected to the investigation and considered invoking executive privilege, but ultimately did not.

OIG investigators interviewed Jackson and 78 witnesses. The OIG noted that its interview of Jackson "was limited in scope and unproductive" because lawyers in the White House Counsel's office insisted upon participating in the interview and "instructed Jackson not to answer any questions concerning events after his appointment as the Physician to the President in July 2013."

In March 2021, the OIG issued its report. It documented Jackson's inappropriate interactions with subordinates and heavy drinking while on duty. The OIG concluded, by a preponderance of the evidence, that Jackson had "made sexual and denigrating statements about one of his female medical subordinates to another of his subordinates"; that Jackson "drank alcohol with his subordinates in Manila, became intoxicated, and, while in his hotel room, engaged in behavior that witnesses described as screaming and yelling, and behavior that some complained might wake the President"; and that Jackson took Ambien (a sleep medication) during official travel, "raising concerns about his potential incapacity to provide proper medical care during this travel." In addition to findings that Jackson had "engaged in inappropriate conduct involving the use of alcohol" during two presidential trips, the report also found that he "disparaged, belittled, bullied, and humiliated subordinates"; "created a negative WHMU work environment"; and "failed to conduct himself in an exemplary manner and made an unfavorable impact on the overall WHMU command climate." On March 2, 2021, the inspector general briefed members of Congress on its review.

After the report was issued, Jackson said that the allegations were a "political hit job because I stood with President Trump" and that they "resurrected those same false allegations from my years with the Obama Administration because I have refused to turn my back on President Trump."

== U.S. House of Representatives ==
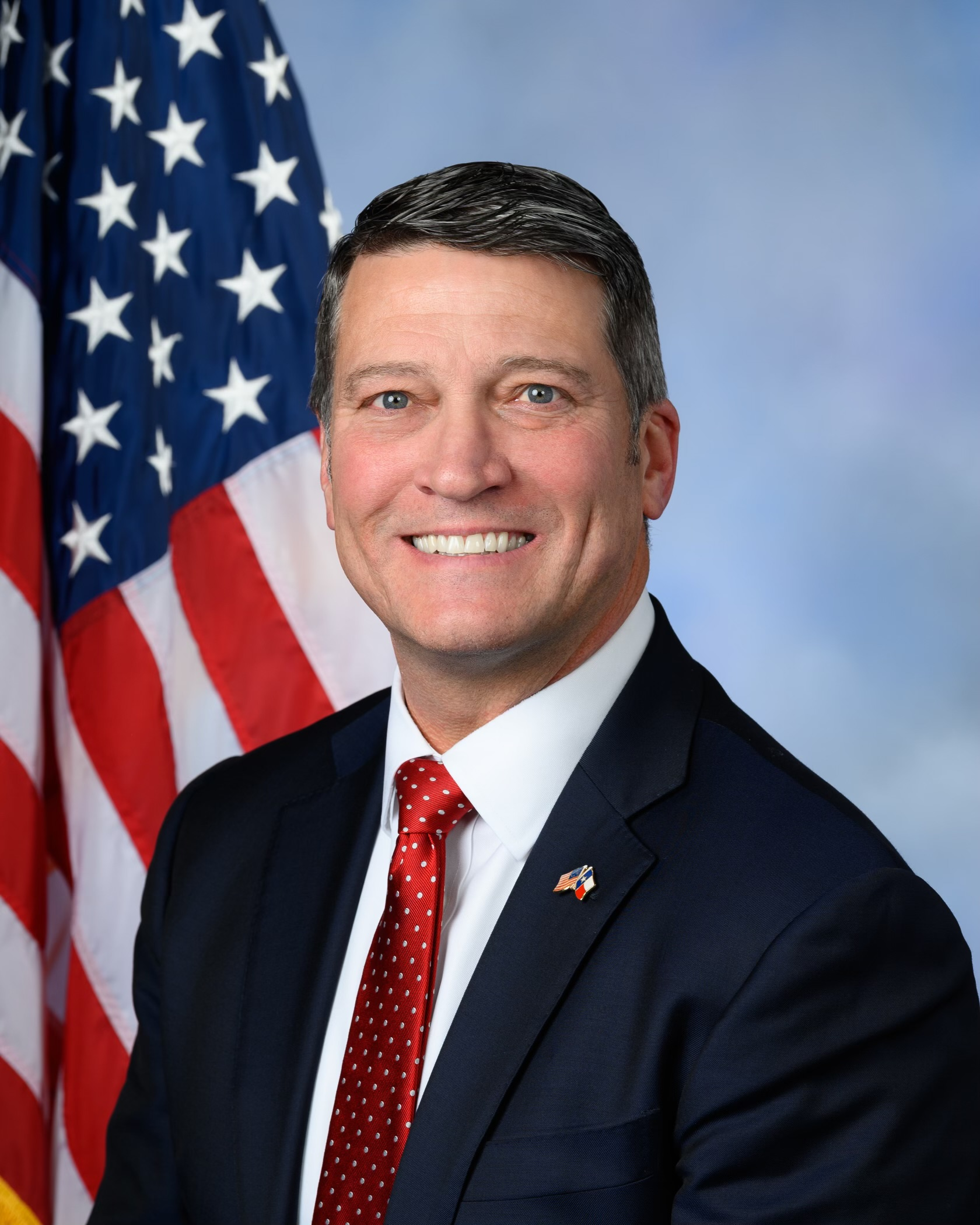
Official portrait from the 117th Congress

=== Elections ===
==== 2020 ====
On December 9, 2019, Jackson filed to run for Congress in Texas's 13th congressional district. The seat came open when 13-term incumbent Republican Mac Thornberry announced he would not seek reelection in 2020. Jackson finished in second place in the Republican primary, behind former Texas Cattle Feeders Association lobbyist Josh Winegarner, and the two faced off in a July 14 runoff election for the nomination. Jackson defeated Winegarner, 55.58% to 44.42%. According to The New York Times, Jackson "ran a campaign based on his close relationship with President Trump". He leveraged that relationship to obtain assistance from two top officials with Trump's reelection campaign, Justin Clark and Bill Stepien.

In May 2020, Jackson claimed without evidence that Obama had spied on Trump's 2016 presidential campaign, and accused him of "[weaponizing] the highest levels of our government to spy on President Trump." Jackson added, "Every Deep State traitor deserves to be brought to justice for their heinous actions."

Jackson opposed mask mandates to halt the spread of COVID-19. He has said, "I think that wearing a mask is a personal choice, and I don't particularly want my government telling me that I have to wear a mask."

Jackson won the general election, taking 79.4% of the vote to Democratic nominee Gus Trujillo's 18.5%. Since Thornberry was elected in the 1994 Republican wave, no Democrat has crossed the 40% mark in the district, and only three have managed 30%.

=== Tenure ===
Jackson attended the January 6 "Stop the Steal" rally at the White House Ellipse. During the January 6 attack on the Capitol, he was inside the Capitol when members of the Oath Keepers militia allegedly exchanged text messages about protecting Jackson because he had supposedly had "critical data". Oathkeeper leader Stewart Rhodes replied, writing: "Give him my cell". Rhodes was later charged with seditious conspiracy, convicted, and sentenced to 18 years in federal prison. Later on January 6, 2021, during the certification of the 2020 election, Jackson objected to certifying Arizona's and Pennsylvania's electoral votes.

On May 19, 2021, Jackson voted against legislation to establish the formation of a January 6 commission meant to investigate the storming of the U.S. Capitol. On May 2, 2022, the January 6 committee released a letter to Jackson requesting he meet with the committee; in response, Jackson released a statement calling the committee "illegitimate".

In late February 2021, Jackson and a dozen other Republican House members skipped votes and enlisted others to vote for them, attributing their absences to ongoing COVID-19 pandemic. However, he and the other members were actually attending the Conservative Political Action Conference, which was held simultaneously with their absences. In response, the Campaign for Accountability, a liberal ethics watchdog group, filed a complaint with the House Committee on Ethics and requested an investigation into those absences by Jackson and the other lawmakers.

Jackson, along with all other Senate and House Republicans, voted against the American Rescue Plan Act of 2021.

In June 2021, Jackson was one of 14 House Republicans to vote against legislation to establish June 19, or Juneteenth, as a federal holiday.

In November 2021, Jackson created a conspiracy theory that Democrats made up the Omicron variant of COVID-19 (he called it "MEV - the Midterm Election Variant") as "a reason to push unsolicited nationwide mail-in ballots" and to "cheat" in the upcoming midterm elections.

In May 2022, the Office of Congressional Ethics reported that there was "substantial reason" to believe that Jackson had used campaign funds for personal use, to pay for unlimited access for himself and his wife to the Amarillo Club, a private dining club in Amarillo, Texas. Jackson refused to cooperate with the Congressional investigation, and his campaign's treasurer and accounting firm refused to provide requested documents to investigators. In December 2024, Jackson was cleared by the House Ethics Committee. While the committee stated that there was evidence suggesting Jackson's campaigns did not entirely adhere to campaign finance regulations, the committee said “However, there was no evidence that any member intentionally misused campaign funds for their personal benefit."

In December 2022, according to The Intercept, Jackson falsely claimed that California representative Katie Porter had asserted that "pedophilia is not a crime" but "an identity", referring to an edited video of a congressional hearing.

Jackson endorsed Trump's campaign in the 2024 presidential election.

Jackson was among the 71 Republicans who were joined by 46 Democrats to vote against final passage of the Fiscal Responsibility Act of 2023 in the House. Republicans voting against it contended it did not cut spending enough, while Democrats objected to the increased work requirements for program recipients.

In July 2024, Jackson introduced the Wildfire Victim Tax Relief and Recovery Act which exclude Texas Panhandle wildfire relief payments provided by the United States Government from gross income so that the relief payments isn't included in income tax calculations.

==== Veterans' health ====
Jackson voted against the 2022 PACT Act, which expanded Veterans Affairs benefits to veterans exposed to toxic chemicals during their military service.

==== Transgender rights ====
In September 2025, in the aftermath of the assassination of Charlie Kirk, Jackson stated on Newsmax that transgender people should be institutionalized, calling them "a cancer that's spreading across this country."

=== 2023 Texas rodeo incident ===
In July 2023, Jackson was briefly detained by law enforcement in White Deer, Texas, during a rodeo. Video of the incident provided by the Texas Department of Public Safety showed that Jackson tried to help a teenager suffering from a seizure. After a trooper requested that he step back to allow paramedics to help her, Jackson confronted the trooper, pushed past officers who positioned themselves between him and the trooper, and was subdued and handcuffed. Rising, Jackson shouted, "You are a fucking full-on dick!" "You better recalculate, motherfucker!" "I'm gonna call the governor tomorrow and I'm gonna talk to him about this shit because this is fuckin' ridiculous." Jackson later spoke to Carson County sheriff Tam Terry, who reported that Jackson demanded that the deputies who handcuffed him be punished and threatened to go after Terry politically.

=== Committee assignments ===
For the 119th Congress:

- Committee on Agriculture
  - Subcommittee on Conservation, Research, and Biotechnology
  - Subcommittee on Livestock, Dairy, and Poultry
- Committee on Armed Services
  - Subcommittee on Intelligence and Special Operations (Chairman)
  - Subcommittee on Seapower and Projection Forces
- Committee on Foreign Affairs
  - Subcommittee on Africa
  - Subcommittee on Middle East and North Africa
  - Subcommittee on Oversight and Intelligence
- Permanent Select Committee on Intelligence
  - Subcommittee on Central Intelligence Agency
  - Subcommittee on Oversight and Investigations (Chairman)

=== Caucus memberships ===
- Republican Study Committee
- Congressional Ukraine Caucus
- Congressional Western Caucus

== Personal life ==
Jackson has a wife, Jane, and three children. Jackson is a member of the Churches of Christ.

According to Jackson, his nephew was among those injured during the attempted assassination of Donald Trump on July 13, 2024, in Butler, Pennsylvania. According to him, one of the bullets grazed his nephew’s neck.

== Awards and decorations ==
Jackson's decorations, awards, and badges include, among others:

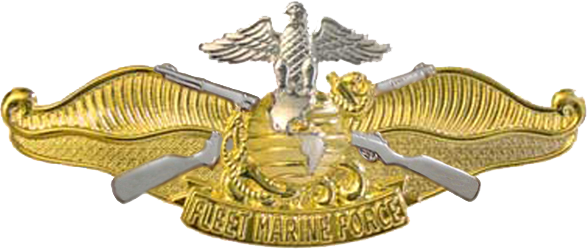

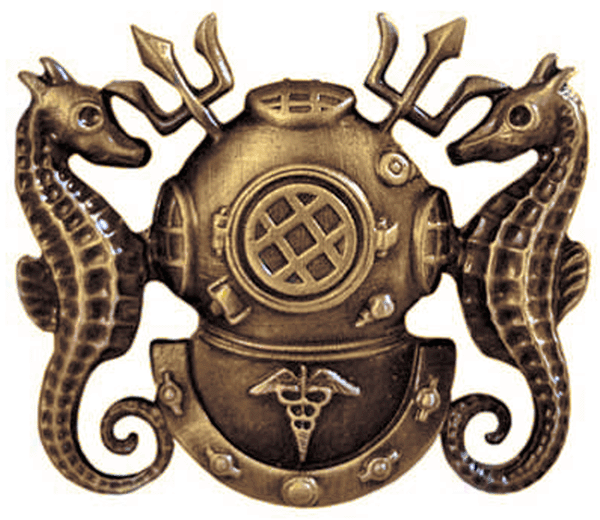

1st row	Defense Superior Service Medal		Legion of Merit	
2nd row	Navy and Marine Corps Commendation Medal w/ three 5/16" gold stars	Navy and Marine Corps Achievement Medal w/ two 5/16" gold stars	Joint Meritorious Unit Award	Navy Unit Commendation w/ one 3/16" bronze star
3rd row	Navy and Marine Corps Meritorious Unit Commendation w/ two 3/16" bronze stars	Navy Expeditionary Medal	National Defense Service Medal w/ one 3/16" bronze star	Kosovo Campaign Medal w/ one 3/16" bronze star
4th row	Iraq Campaign Medal with Fleet Marine Force Combat Operation Insignia	Global War on Terrorism Service Medal	Armed Forces Service Medal	Navy and Marine Corps Sea Service Deployment Ribbon w/ two 3/16" bronze stars
5th row	Navy and Marine Corps Overseas Service Ribbon w/ one 3/16" bronze star	NATO Medal for Yugoslavia Service w/ one 3/16" bronze star	Navy Expert Rifleman Medal	Navy Expert Pistol Shot Medal
Badges	Fleet Marine Force insignia			
Badges	Navy Diving Medical Officer Badge		Presidential Service Badge	

== See also ==
- Unsuccessful nominations to the Cabinet of the United States

== Notes ==
Military offices
Preceded by Jeffrey Kuhlman	Physician to the President; 2013–2018	Succeeded by Sean Conley
U.S. House of Representatives
Preceded by Mac Thornberry	Member of the U.S. House of Representatives from Texas's 13th congressional district 2021–present	Incumbent
U.S. order of precedence (ceremonial)
Preceded by Ashley Hinson	United States representatives by seniority 256th	Succeeded by Sara Jacobs
