= Howard McCrum Snyder =

American physician (1881-1970)

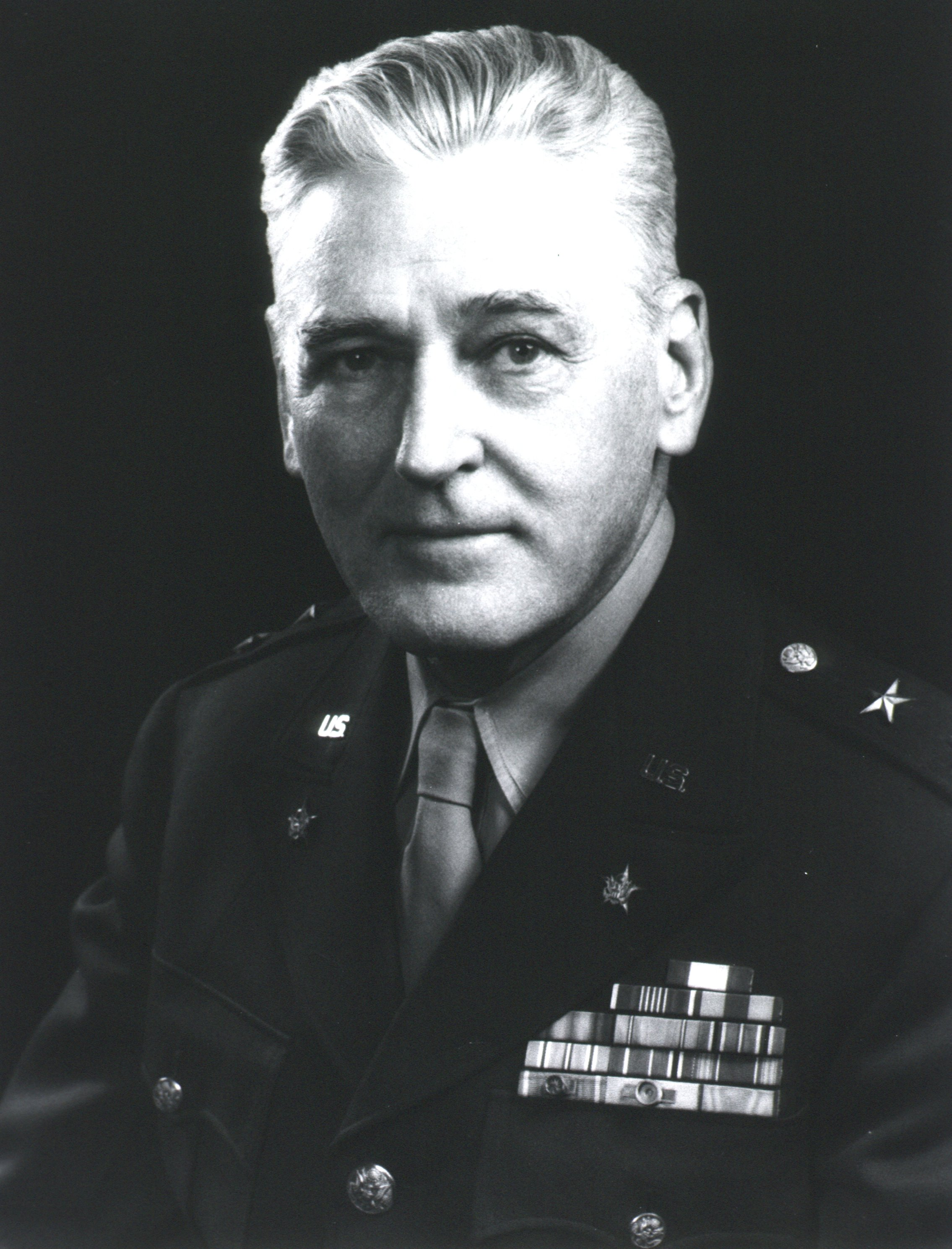

Physician to the President
- In office 1953–1961
- President: Dwight D. Eisenhower
- Preceded by: Wallace H. Graham
- Succeeded by: Janet G. Travell

Personal details
- Born: February 7, 1881 Cheyenne, Wyoming, U.S.
- Died: September 22, 1970 (aged 89) Washington, D.C., U.S.
- Spouse: Alice Elizabeth Concklin
- Children: 2
- Education: Jefferson Medical College
- Occupation: Physician

Major General Howard McCrum Snyder (February 7, 1881 – September 22, 1970) was a member of the United States Army Medical Corps, and Physician to the President for Dwight D. Eisenhower.

== Biography ==
=== Early life ===
General Snyder was born in Cheyenne, Wyoming. He was the son Albert Snyder and Priscilla McCrum. His father died when he was ten years old. He attended the University of Colorado from 1899 to 1901. Snyder then attended Jefferson Medical College and received his M.D. in 1905. He completed his medical internship at Presbyterian Hospital in Philadelphia.

He became a contract surgeon at Fort Douglas, Utah. His experience with military service was so favorable that he decided upon a military-medical career. He graduated from the U.S. Army Medical School in Washington, D.C., in June 1908 with high honors and was simultaneously commissioned a first lieutenant in the United States Army Medical Corps.

In 1909, Snyder's first military assignment took him to the Philippines where he served with the Research Board of Tropical Medicine. While in the Philippines he met he met Alice Elizabeth Concklin. They married July 12, 1910.

=== Career ===
In 1911 he returned to the United States and, in the next twenty-five years, his varied command and instructional assignments took him to numerous posts in the United States and one in Puerto Rico. From 1936 to 1940 Snyder was medical adviser to the National Guard Bureau in Washington, D.C.

From December 1940 until June 1945 Snyder was assistant to the inspector general of the War Department, a job which required him to travel to all theaters of operations during World War II. Toward the end of the war Snyder became closely acquainted with Dwight D. Eisenhower and, although technically retired because of his age in March 1945, remained on active duty in Europe as General Eisenhower's personal physician until after the surrender of Germany.

Snyder continued his association with the Eisenhower family after the war, treating Mamie Eisenhower for pneumonia in November 1945 and, after retiring from military service, remaining close to Dwight D. Eisenhower while he was president of Columbia University. Snyder became senior adviser to the Conservation of Human Resources Project and Manpower Council, a project instituted by Eisenhower in 1950 to find ways of correcting the manpower wastage identified during World War II.

In January 1951 Snyder was again called to active duty and was assigned to Supreme Headquarters, Allied Powers, Europe (SHAPE) where he soon became a special adviser to General Eisenhower. After being retired from military service once again, Snyder rode Eisenhower's campaign train in September 1952 during Eisenhower's successful bid for the presidency.

=== Physician to the President ===
After Eisenhower's inauguration as president in January 1953, Snyder was appointed to the White House staff as the Physician to the President, and remained Eisenhower's personal physician throughout the administration. Snyder's duties in the White House involved providing close personal attention to the medical needs of Eisenhower and his family, as well as the White House staff. This personal attention included accompanying the president on overseas trips and those within the United States, vacations, and golf outings. He administered medications, took temperatures, gave the president daily medical advice and recorded observations on the president's activities, disposition, and physical condition. Snyder rendered initial treatment to Dwight Eisenhower when the president suffered a heart attack in September 1955 and was at the President's side during his ileitis operation in June 1956.

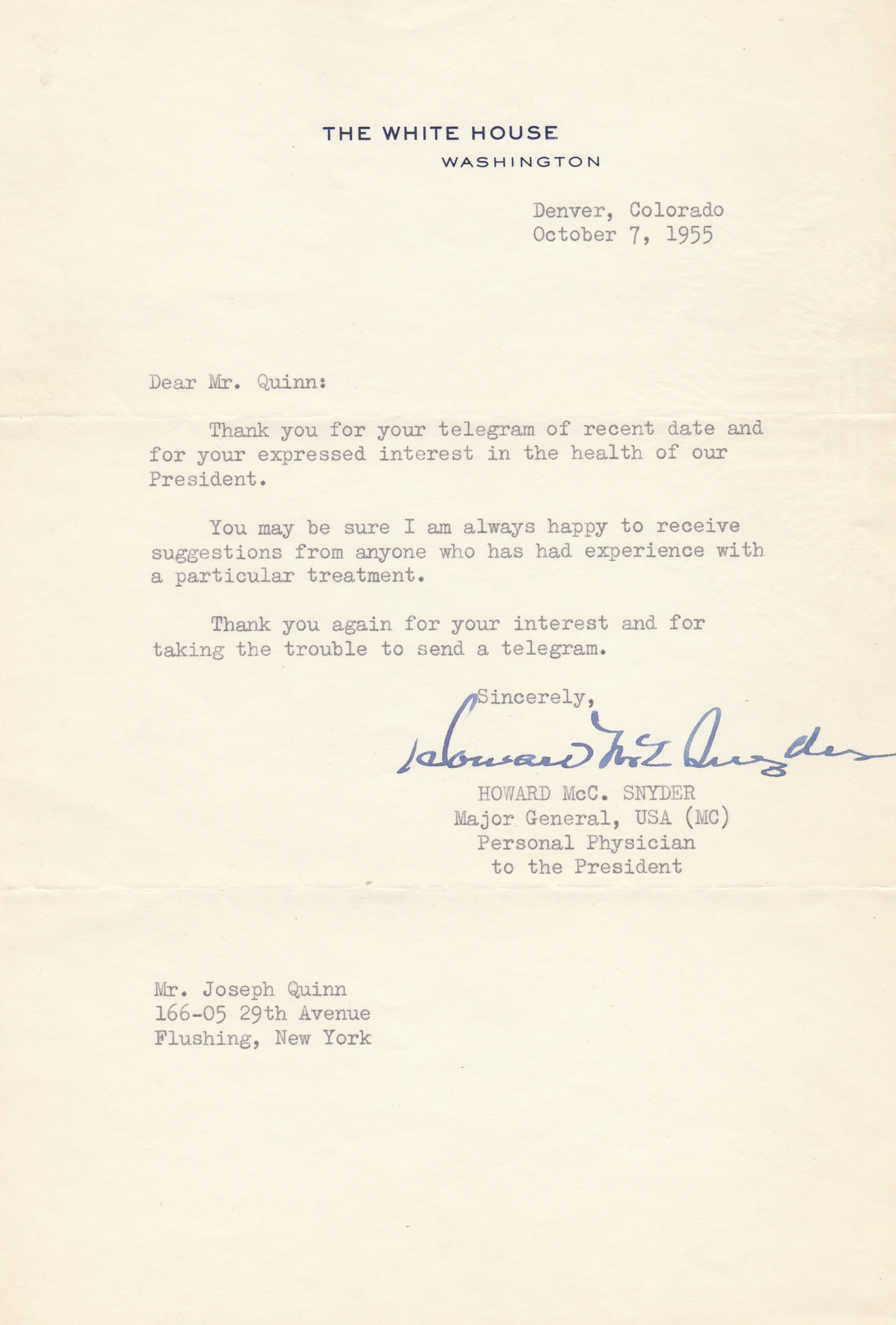
Scan of a typed and signed letter sent from Dr. Howard McCrum Snyder in Denver to Mr. Joseph Quinn in New York thanking him for his suggestions regarding the treatment of President Eisenhower following his heart attack. On official White House stationery.

He died in Washington DC at Walter Reed hospital on September 22, 1970.
