= Kevin O'Connor (physician) =

Physician to the President of the United States

Colonel Kevin O'Connor
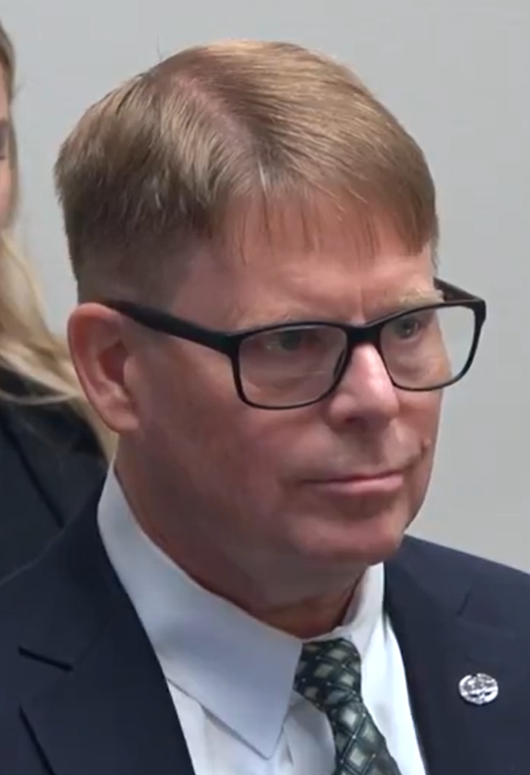
- O'Connor in 2025

Physician to the President
- In office January 25, 2021 – March 7, 2025
- President: Joe Biden; Donald Trump
- Preceded by: Sean Conley
- Succeeded by: Sean Barbabella

Personal details
- Born: Kevin Charles O'Connor
- Children: 3
- Education: St. Bonaventure University (BS); New York Institute of Technology College of Osteopathic Medicine (DO)

Military service
- Allegiance: United States
- Branch/service: United States Army
- Years of service: 1995–2017
- Rank: Colonel
- Awards: Combat Medical Badge; Order of Military Medical Merit

Kevin Charles O'Connor is an American physician and retired U.S. Army colonel who served as the physician to the president under Presidents Joe Biden and Donald Trump. He was replaced by Sean Barbabella on March 7, 2025.

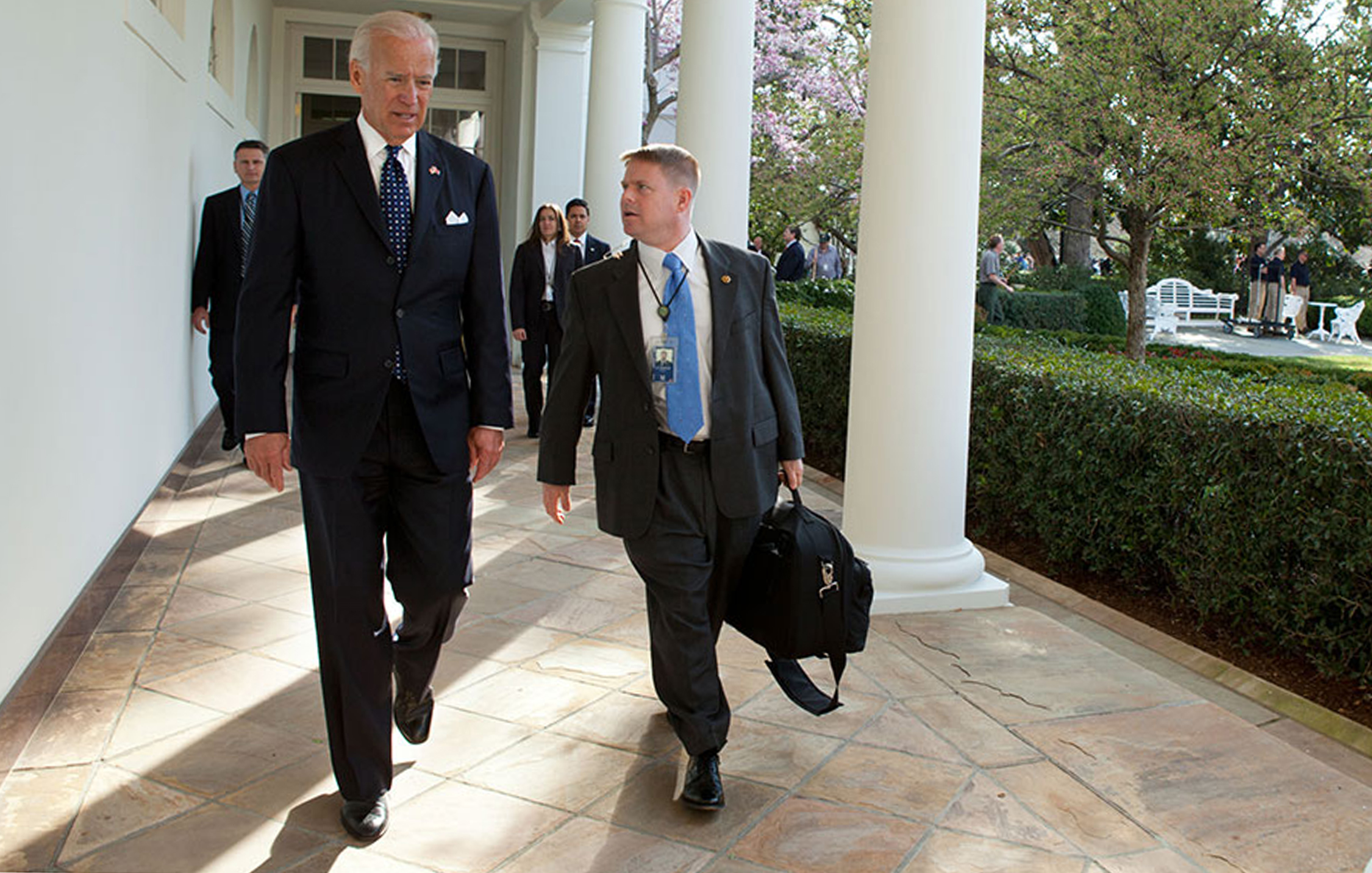
O'Connor (right) with then-Vice President Joe Biden

== Education ==
O'Connor attended college at St. Bonaventure University on a US Army Reserve Officers' Training Corps (ROTC) scholarship, graduating with a major in biology and minor in theology. In 1992, he graduated medical school from the New York Institute of Technology College of Osteopathic Medicine. He completed residency training in family medicine at The Mountainside Hospital in Montclair, New Jersey, where he served as chief resident in 1995. He also completed U.S. Army flight surgeon training and was designated a master flight surgeon in 2010.

== Career ==
O’Connor served 22 years in the U.S. Army, including tours of duty with the 82nd Airborne Division, 75th Ranger Regiment, and United States Army Special Operations Command, and over a decade at the White House. O'Connor has received the Combat Medic Badge. He is on faculty at George Washington University, where he served as the founding director of executive medicine. He worked for three years in the George W. Bush administration. In 2013, he was inducted into the Order of Military Medical Merit. He began service as a physician in the White House in 2006 under the Bush administration. In 2009, O'Connor was named physician to the vice president. In 2017, O'Connor retired from the US Army as colonel. In January 2020, he was appointed medical director of St. Bonaventure University's Franciscan Health Care Professions program. According to Biden's memoir Promise Me, Dad, O'Connor worked closely with the Biden family during Beau Biden's battle with brain cancer. In 2017, he collaborated with James Biden to create a healthcare program with Americore for veterans.

=== White House ===
A few days after his inauguration, President Joe Biden announced that he would appoint O'Connor as the White House physician. His predecessor, Sean Conley, was physician to previous president Donald Trump and departed the White House alongside Trump on January 20, 2021.

On July 21, 2022, O'Connor diagnosed Biden with COVID-19 and prescribed him with Paxlovid. There was commentary on O'Connor not briefing the White House Press Corps during Biden's illness, instead communicating through memoranda addressed to the White House press secretary, Karine Jean-Pierre.

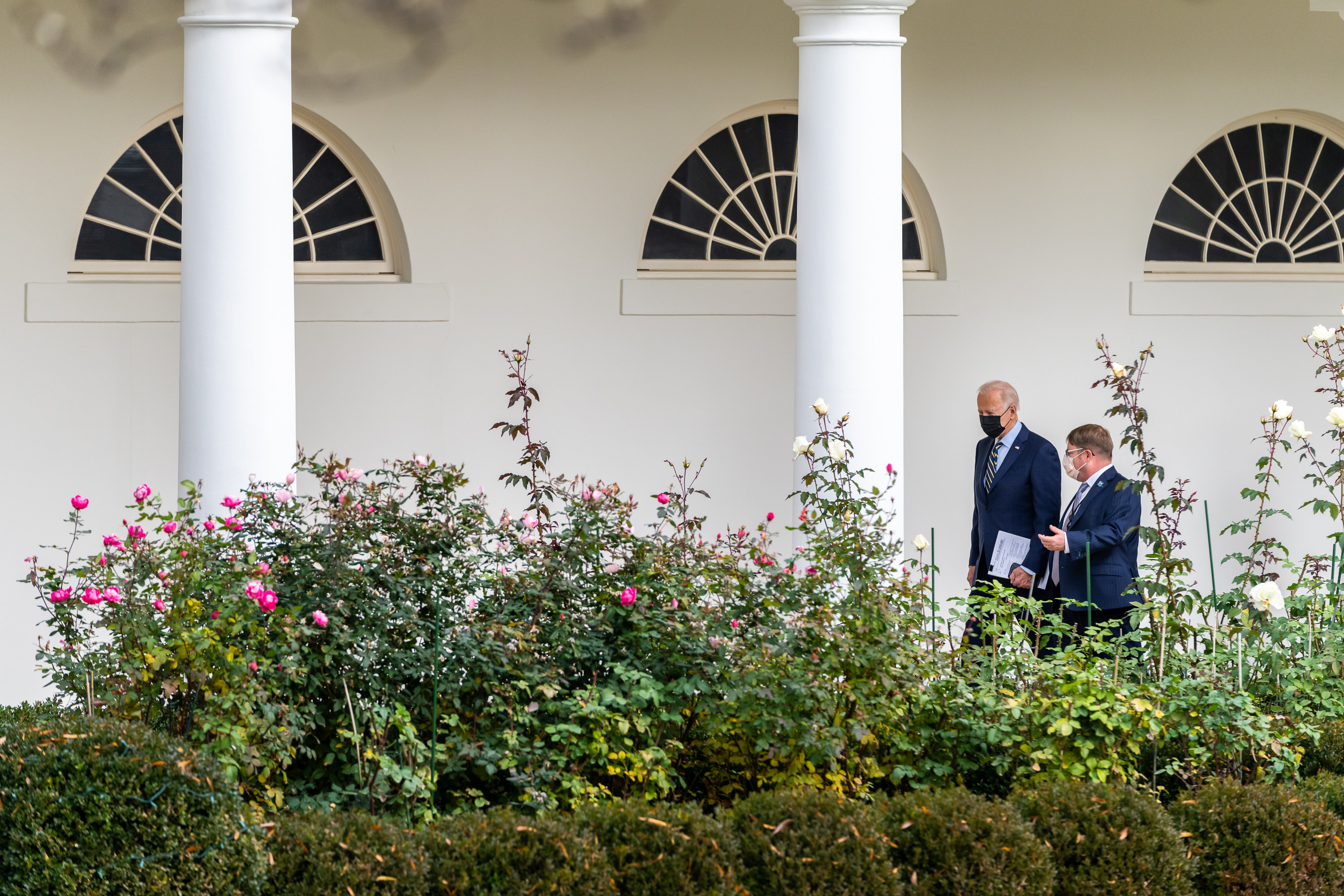
O'Connor with President Biden walking along the West Colonnade of the White House on December 6, 2021.

On July 7, 2024, James Comer, chair of the House Oversight Committee, sent a letter to O'Connor requesting an interview. He was asked to testify on Biden's health, due to the President's poor performance during the June 2024 presidential debate with Donald Trump, and with his possible connections to alleged business dealings with the Biden family.

Later, on July 17, 2024, Biden was diagnosed by O'Connor with COVID-19 and was prescribed with Paxlovid.

=== Post-Administration ===
On July 9, 2025, O'Connor refused to answer questions on Biden's mental state during a closed door interview with the House Oversight Committee, pleading the fifth amendment.

== Personal life ==
O'Connor lives in Maryland with his wife, Chris, and their three daughters, Kieran, Ryan and Dylan.

Military offices
Preceded by Sean Conley	Physician to the President; 2021–2025	Succeeded by Sean Barbabella
