= Daniel Ruge =

American neurosurgeon (1917–2005)

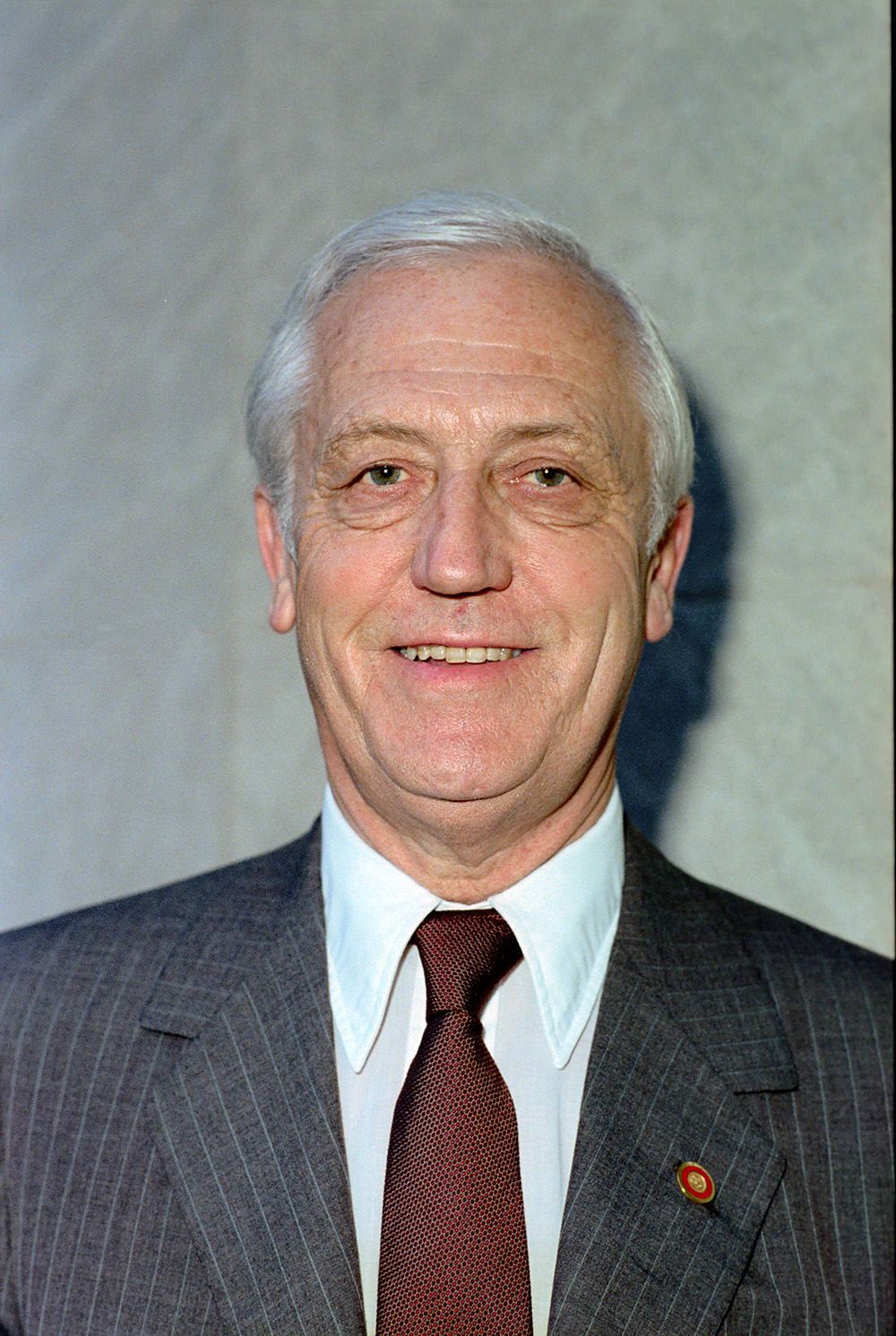

Physician to the President
- In office January 20, 1981 – January 20, 1985
- President: Ronald Reagan
- Preceded by: William M. Lukash
- Succeeded by: T. Burton Smith

Personal details
- Born: Daniel August Ruge; May 13, 1917 Murdock, Nebraska
- Died: August 30, 2005 (aged 88) Denver, Colorado

Daniel Ruge (May 13, 1917 – August 30, 2005) was an American neurosurgeon. He served as Physician to the President under Ronald Reagan from 1981 to 1985.

== Early life ==
Ruge was born in Murdock, Nebraska. He received his undergraduate degree from North Central College in Naperville, Illinois. He studied medicine at Northwestern University, receiving his Doctorate in 1945. Later, he advanced his studies in surgery at Northwestern University, where he began working with Loyal Davis, stepfather of Nancy Reagan.

== Career ==
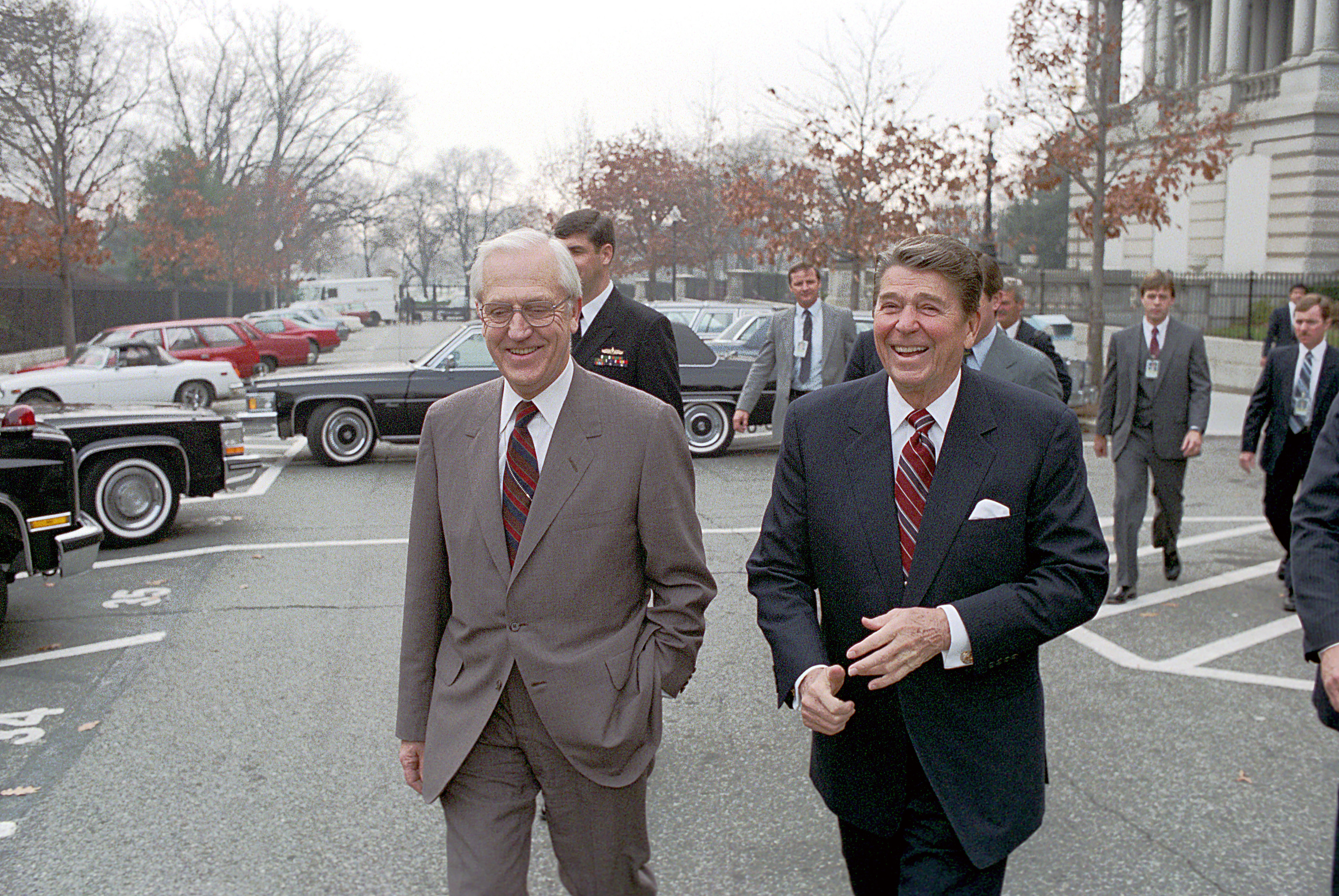
Ruge with President Ronald Reagan in 1984

Ruge became a professor of surgery at Northwestern University Medical School, and Chief of Staff and Chairman of Neurosurgery at Northwestern Memorial Hospital.

In 1976, Ruge relocated to work for the Veterans Administration in Maryland. He was serving with the spinal cord injury service when Reagan appointed him Physician to the President, where he oversaw Reagan's treatment after he was shot.

Ruge resigned after Reagan's first term and called his job "vastly overrated, boring and not medically challenging". Ruge could not attend most state dinners due to lack of space. He nonetheless had to be ready for emergencies, and usually waited alone in his office wearing a tuxedo. Ruge stated that an advantage, however, was that because of the position's prestige "[a] president's physician can ask for anything, and he will get it. No doctor will refuse a request to consult". The White House physician can enter the Oval Office or Executive Residence at any time; Ruge sometimes invited experts visiting Washington to examine the president.

He died of a ruptured aortic aneurysm on August 30, 2005, at age 88, in Denver, Colorado.
