= Jeffrey Kuhlman =

American M.D. and former Physician to the President

Captain Jeffrey Kuhlman
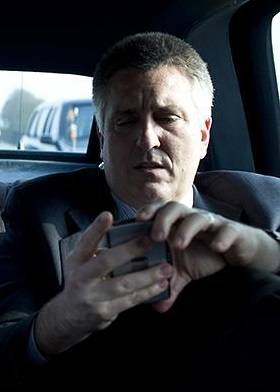
- Kuhlman in 2009

Physician to the President
- In office January 20, 2009 – July 25, 2013
- President: Barack Obama
- Preceded by: Richard Tubb
- Succeeded by: Ronny Jackson

Personal details
- Born: Jeffrey Craig Kuhlman; 1963 (age 62–63)
- Spouse: Sandy
- Education: Southern College; Loma Linda University (MD); Johns Hopkins University (MPH)
- Website: https://jeffreykuhlman.com/

Military service
- Branch: United States Navy
- Service years: 1983–2013
- Rank: Captain
- Unit: Medical Corps

Jeffrey Craig Kuhlman (born 1963) is an American medical doctor and former Physician to the President under Barack Obama. He is board-certified in aerospace, family, and occupational medicine.

== Early life and education ==
He graduated from Loma Linda University Medical School in 1987 and completed his residency at Loma Linda University Medical Center.

== Career ==
Following his retirement from the United States Navy, Kuhlman took the position of senior vice president and associate chief medical officer at Florida Hospital. Kuhlman served as White House physician from 2000 to 2013, attending to Presidents Bill Clinton and George W. Bush, and physician to the president under Barack Obama from 2009 to 2013.

He also served as director of the White House Medical Unit, White House Physician, and Senior Flight Surgeon of Marine One.

== Personal life ==
Kuhlman is a member of the Seventh-day Adventist Church.

== Bibliography ==
Kuhlman, J. (2024). Transforming Presidential Healthcare: Ensuring Comprehensive Care for the commander and chief amid 21st Century threats. Ballast Books.

== External link ==
- Dr. Jeffrey Kuhlman, Vice President & Chief Quality & Safety Officer at AdventHealth Becker's Hospital Review

Military offices
Preceded by Richard Tubb	Physician to the President; 2009–2013	Succeeded by Ronny Jackson
