= Walter R. Tkach =

American physician (1917–1989)

Major General Walter R. Tkach
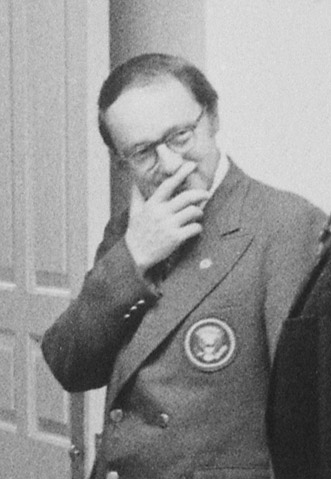
- Tkach in 1973

Physician to the President
- In office January 20, 1969 – September 16, 1974
- President: Richard Nixon; Gerald Ford
- Preceded by: George G. Burkley
- Succeeded by: William M. Lukash

Personal details
- Born: Walter Robert Tkach; February 9, 1917 La Belle, Pennsylvania
- Died: October 31, 1989 (aged 72) San Diego, California

Military service
- Allegiance: United States
- Branch/service: United States Air Force
- Rank: Major General

Walter Robert Tkach (February 9, 1917 – October 31, 1989) was an American physician who served as physician to the president under Richard Nixon from 1969 to 1974.

He died of heart disease on October 31, 1989, in San Diego, California at age 72.
