= Eleanor Mariano =

United States admiral and Physician to the President (born 1955)

Rear Admiral (Lower Half) Eleanor Mariano
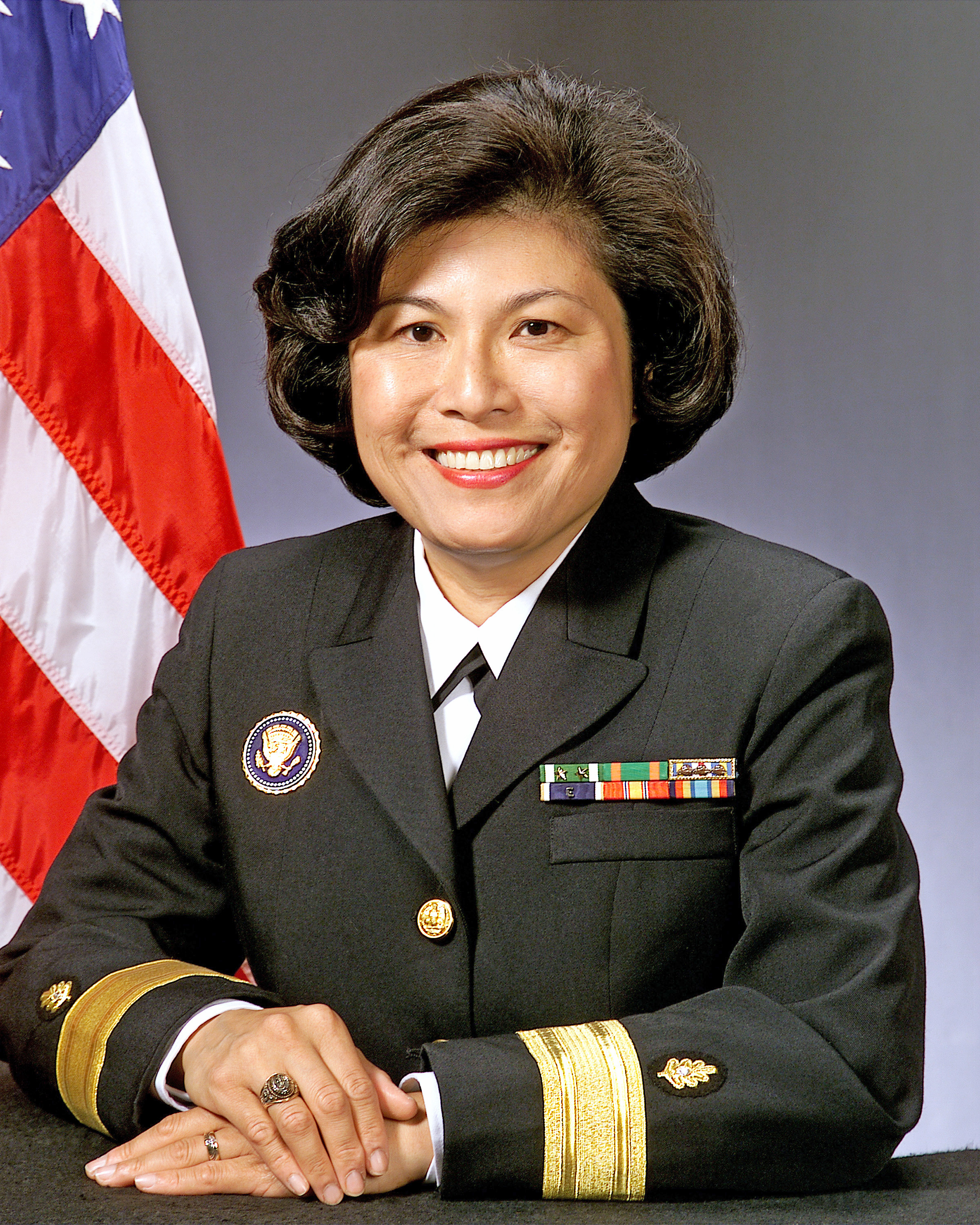
- Official portrait, 2000

Physician to the President
- In office 23 October 1993 – 31 December 2001
- President: Bill Clinton; George W. Bush
- Preceded by: Lawrence C. Mohr, Jr. Burton J. Lee III (concurrently)
- Succeeded by: Richard Tubb

Personal details
- Born: 1955 (age 70–71) Naval Station Sangley Point, Cavite City, Philippines
- Nickname: Connie

Military service
- Allegiance: United States
- Branch/service: United States Navy
- Years of service: 1977–2001
- Rank: Rear Admiral (Lower Half)
- Commands: White House Medical Unit

Eleanor Concepcion "Connie" Mariano (born 1955) is a Filipino American physician and retired flag officer in the United States Navy. She is the first Filipino American and graduate of the Uniformed Services University of Medicine to reach the rank of Rear Admiral in the U.S. Navy as well as the first woman to become Physician to the President, a position that placed her as director of the White House Medical Unit.

== Background ==
Mariano was born in Naval Station Sangley Point, Cavite City in the Philippines in 1955. Two years later, her parents arrived in the United States. Her father served in the navy as a steward and eventually retired with the rank of Master Chief. Mariano was the valedictorian of her Mar Vista High School, Imperial Beach, California, class of 1973. She graduated from the University of California, San Diego's Revelle College with cum laude honors and a degree in biology.

Mariano joined the U.S. Navy in 1977, and received a medical degree from the Uniformed Services University of Medicine in 1981, graduating as a lieutenant. Following graduation, she served as a doctor on USS Prairie (AD-15) serving in the Indian Ocean and Western Pacific. By 1991, Mariano was a commander and the division head of internal medicine and director of the internal medicine clinic at the San Diego naval hospital. Only a year away from being eligible for release from active duty, she was nominated by her commanding officer to serve as Navy physician to the White House Medical Unit. She joined the unit in June 1992, serving as a physician to President George H. W. Bush, and was about to be issued new orders to be director of the clinic at the Marine Corps Recruit Depot in San Diego when she was personally selected by the incoming President, Bill Clinton, to be White House Physician and director of the White House Medical Unit. Mariano became the first woman in the military appointed to be the White House physician. As a result, she received an early promotion to captain on December 7, 1994. In the autumn of 1999, Mariano was nominated by the President to the rank of rear admiral (lower half); she was formally promoted in 2000.

In 2001, Dr. Mariano retired from the Navy and left the White House to join the Mayo Clinic in Scottsdale, Arizona. She was succeeded as White House Physician by Richard Tubb. In 2005, she went on to found the Center for Executive Medicine in Scottsdale.

Hawaii State Senator Will Espero submitted Mariano's name to President Barack Obama for the position of Surgeon General of the United States in May 2009.

She is the author of the book The White House Doctor: My Patients Were Presidents - A Memoir. With a foreword from Bill Clinton, the autobiographical book takes a look at the personal lives of the three American Presidents and three American First Ladies she had taken care of while working as a Physician to the President.

== See also ==
- Women in the United States Navy
- List of female United States military generals and flag officers

Military offices
Preceded by Lawrence C. Mohr, Jr. Burton J. Lee III	Physician to the President; 1993–2001	Succeeded by Richard Tubb
