= Howard Bruenn =

American physician

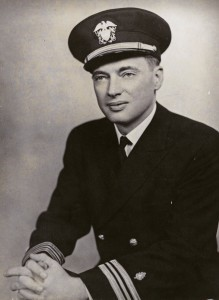

Physician to the President
- In office 1944–1945
- President: Franklin Roosevelt
- Preceded by: Ross T. McIntire
- Succeeded by: Wallace H. Graham

Personal details
- Born: Howard Gerald Bruenn; 1905 Youngstown, Ohio, US
- Died: July 25, 1995 (aged 90) Sorrento, Maine, US
- Education: Columbia University (BA); Johns Hopkins University (MD)

Howard Gerald Bruenn (1905 – July 25, 1995) was an American physician who served as Physician to the President and attended to President Franklin D. Roosevelt in the year before his death.

== Biography ==
Bruenn was born in Youngstown, Ohio. He graduated from Columbia College in 1925 and Johns Hopkins School of Medicine in 1929. He interned at Boston City Hospital and completed his residency at the Columbia University College of Physicians & Surgeons.

He joined the U.S. Navy in 1942 and was commissioned a Lieutenant Commander.

Bruenn was transferred to Bethesda Naval Hospital, where he became chief of cardiology. After giving President Franklin D. Roosevelt a routine health check, he was assigned to be the President's physician. He traveled with the President wherever he went, including the Yalta Conference. He was one of only three people present in Roosevelt's personal quarters in the Little White House when he died on April 12, 1945.

After the President's death, Bruenn returned to private practice until his retirement in 1975 as consultant emeritus and retired chief of the Vanderbilt Clinic at the NewYork-Presbyterian Hospital.

Bruenn, a lifelong resident of Riverdale, Bronx, died on July 29, 1995, in his summer home in Sorrento, Maine at 90 years old.
