= Wallace H. Graham =

United States Air Force general

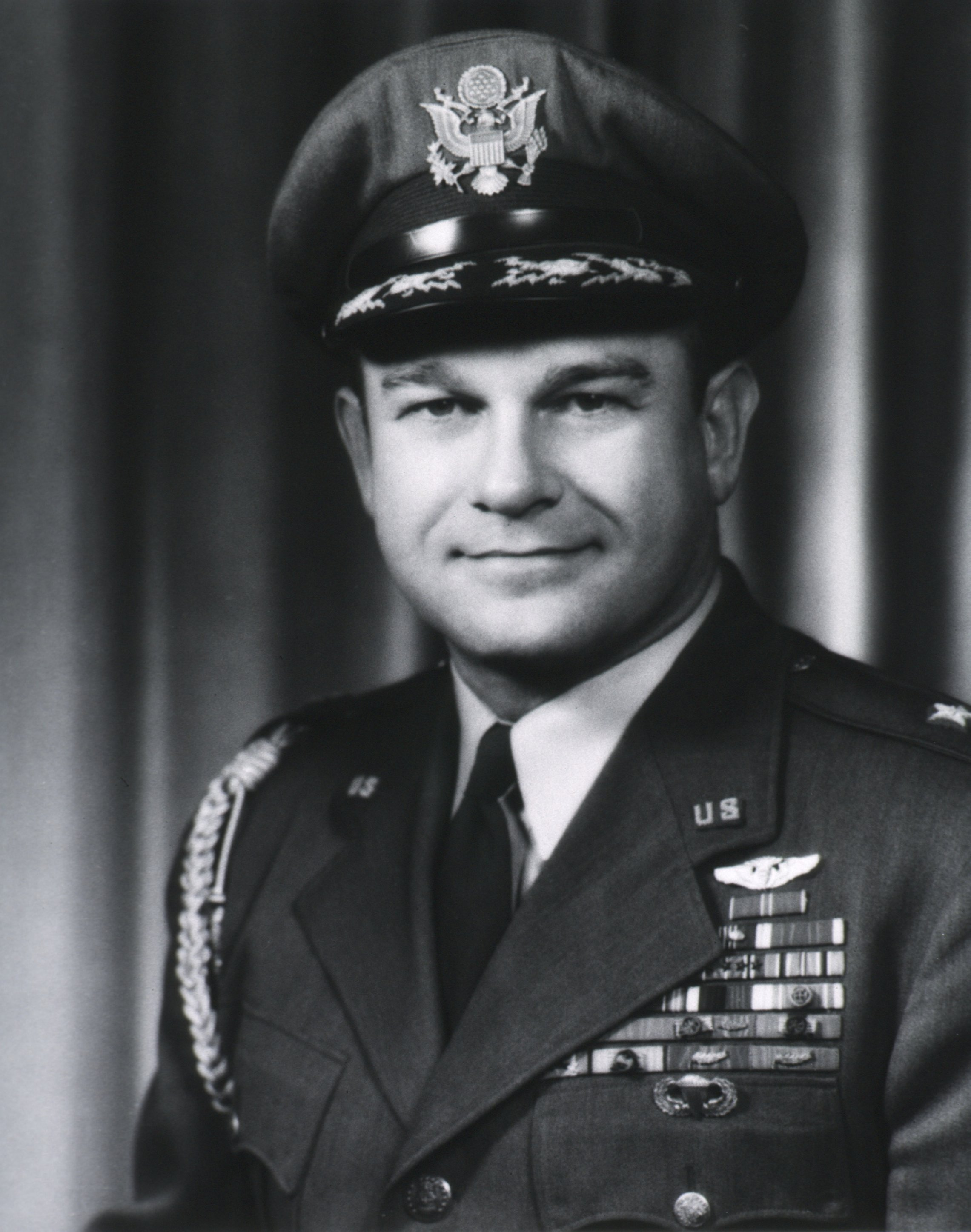

Physician to the President
- In office 1945–1953
- President: Harry S. Truman
- Preceded by: Ross T. McIntire; Howard G. Bruenn (served less than one year)
- Succeeded by: Howard McCrum Snyder

Personal details
- Born: October 9, 1910 Highland, Kansas
- Died: January 4, 1996 (aged 85) Kansas City, Missouri
- Spouse: Velma Ruth Hill
- Awards: Legion of Merit; Bronze Star (2); Purple Heart; Army Commendation Medal (3); Croix de guerre (France); Croix de guerre (Belgium); Order of Leopold (Belgium)

Military service
- Allegiance: United States of America
- Branch/service: United States Army; United States Air Force
- Years of service: 1936-1970
- Rank: Major General
- Commands: Physician to the President 1945-1953
- Battles/wars: World War II • Operation Torch • Operation Overlord • Operation Market Garden • Battle of the Bulge

Wallace Harry Graham (October 9, 1910 – January 8, 1996) was the Physician to the President (1945-1953) during the presidency of Harry S. Truman. In April 1950 President Truman sent Graham with a medical team to visit and assist King Ibn Saud, who, among other things, suffered from severe arthritis. The response from Riyadh was favorable, and the visit helped cement relations between the United States and the Saudi kingdom, which had been strained by the US recognition of Israel.
