= Sean Barbabella =

US Navy captain and osteopathic physician

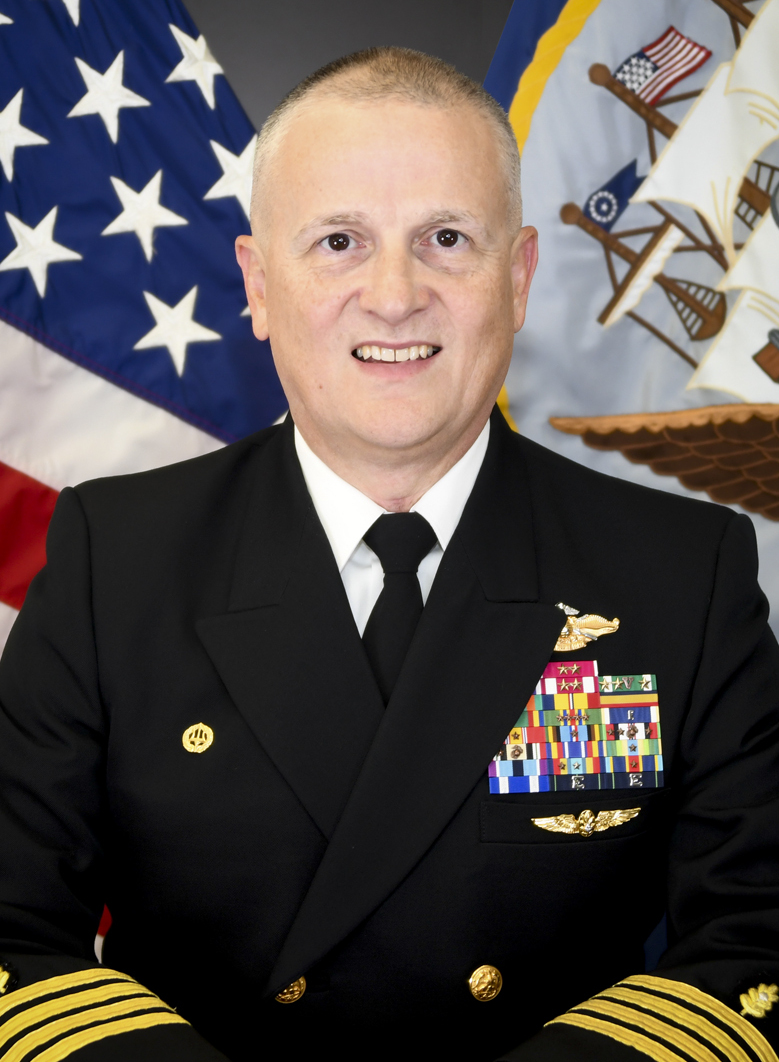
- Official portrait, 2023

Physician to the President
- Incumbent
- Assumed office March 7, 2025
- President: Donald Trump
- Preceded by: Kevin O'Connor

Personal details
- Born: Sean Patrick Barbabella Birdsboro, Pennsylvania, U.S.
- Children: 2
- Education: University of Pittsburgh (BS); Kirksville College of Osteopathic Medicine (DO)

Military service
- Allegiance: United States
- Branch/service: United States Navy
- Rank: Rear Admiral
- Commands: Naval Health Clinic Cherry Point (2013–2025)
- Battles/wars: Iraq War; War in Afghanistan
- Awards: Purple Heart; Legion of Merit

Sean Patrick Barbabella is a United States Navy captain and physician specializing in emergency and tactical medicine. Since 2025, he has served as the physician to the president under Donald Trump.

== Early life ==
Barbabella is a native of Birdsboro, Pennsylvania. He is the son of Vincent M. Barbabella Sr., a retired US Army major and former Army Ranger who served in Vietnam during the Vietnam War.

Sean Barbabella received his bachelor's degree from the University of Pittsburgh in 1992. In 1996, he earned a Doctor of Osteopathic Medicine from A.T. Still University Kirksville College of Osteopathic Medicine in Kirksville, Missouri. He completed his residency at the Naval Medical Center Portsmouth.

== Career ==
Barbabella is a career military physician specializing in emergency and tactical medicine. He completed several tours in Iraq and Afghanistan during his service in the United States Navy. In 2009, during his first deployment to Afghanistan, he was injured in a blast from an improvised explosive device and was subsequently awarded a Purple Heart.

From August 2010 to March 2012, Barbabella served as the division surgeon with the 2nd Marine Division during a year-long deployment to Helmand Province, Afghanistan. He was awarded the Legion of Merit in 2012 for his meritorious conduct and service in that role. During that deployment, Barbabella led more than 40 medical officers and 20 physician assistants and focused on point-of-injury care for service members in combat environments. He implemented improvements in patient tracking systems, including the Blast Exposure Concussion Incident Report and integration of blast injury documentation into electronic medical records. He also contributed to medical training for the Afghan National Army's 215th Corps by designing basic combat lifesaving training, which transitioned to being taught independently by Afghan personnel.

Barbabella played a role in the development of the Mobile Trauma Bay, a mobile medical facility that provided emergency-room-level care in the field and was equipped for resuscitation with medical staff and trauma equipment. He has also served as a member of the Committee on Tactical Combat Casualty Care, which formulates battlefield trauma care guidelines.

After returning to the U.S., Barbabella held the position of executive officer at Naval Medical Center Camp Lejeune. In 2023, he took command of the Naval Health Clinic Cherry Point in Havelock, North Carolina.

In January 2025, Barbabella left the Cherry Point clinic to join the White House Medical Unit and serve as the physician to the president under Donald Trump. In this role, Barbabella, or an additional doctor, is required to never be more than three minutes away from the president.

== Personal life ==
Barbabella is married and has two sons.

Military offices
Preceded by Kevin O'Connor	Physician to the President; 2025–present	Incumbent
