= Lawrence C. Mohr Jr. =

Physician to Presidents Reagan and G. H. W. Bush

Colonel Lawrence C. Mohr Jr.
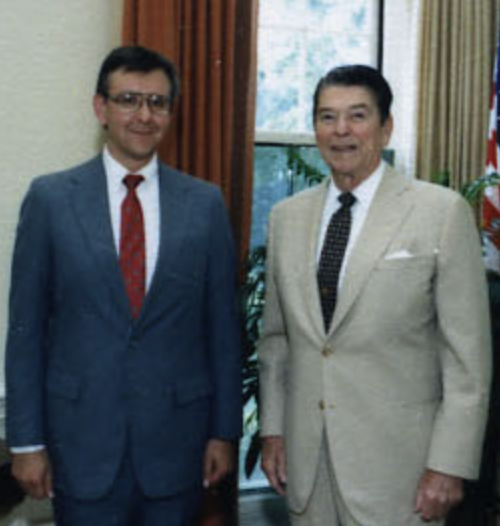
- Mohr (left) with Ronald Reagan in 1987

Physician to the President
- In office 1987–1993 Serving with Burton J. Lee III (1989 to 1993)
- President: Ronald Reagan; George H. W. Bush
- Preceded by: John E. Hutton Jr.
- Succeeded by: Eleanor Mariano

Personal details
- Born: Lawrence Charles Mohr Jr.

Military service
- Allegiance: United States
- Branch/service: United States Army
- Rank: Colonel
- Awards: Defense Distinguished Service Medal, Silver Star, Bronze Star (2), Purple Heart

Lawrence Charles Mohr Jr. was the Physician to the President to Ronald Reagan and George H. W. Bush. As Physician to the President, from 1989 onwards, he served concurrently with Burton J. Lee III, who was picked by Bush. Mohr was an advocate for medical transparency from the White House, stating, "The American people are entitled to know the health status of their president and presidential candidates."

In 2016, Mohr suffered a spinal cord injury, which left him paralyzed. He underwent physical therapy at Shepherd Center.

Military offices
Preceded by John E. Hutton Jr.	Physician to the President; 1987–1993	Succeeded by Burton J. Lee III (served concurrently); Eleanor Mariano
