= Physician to the President =

Physician to the President of the United States

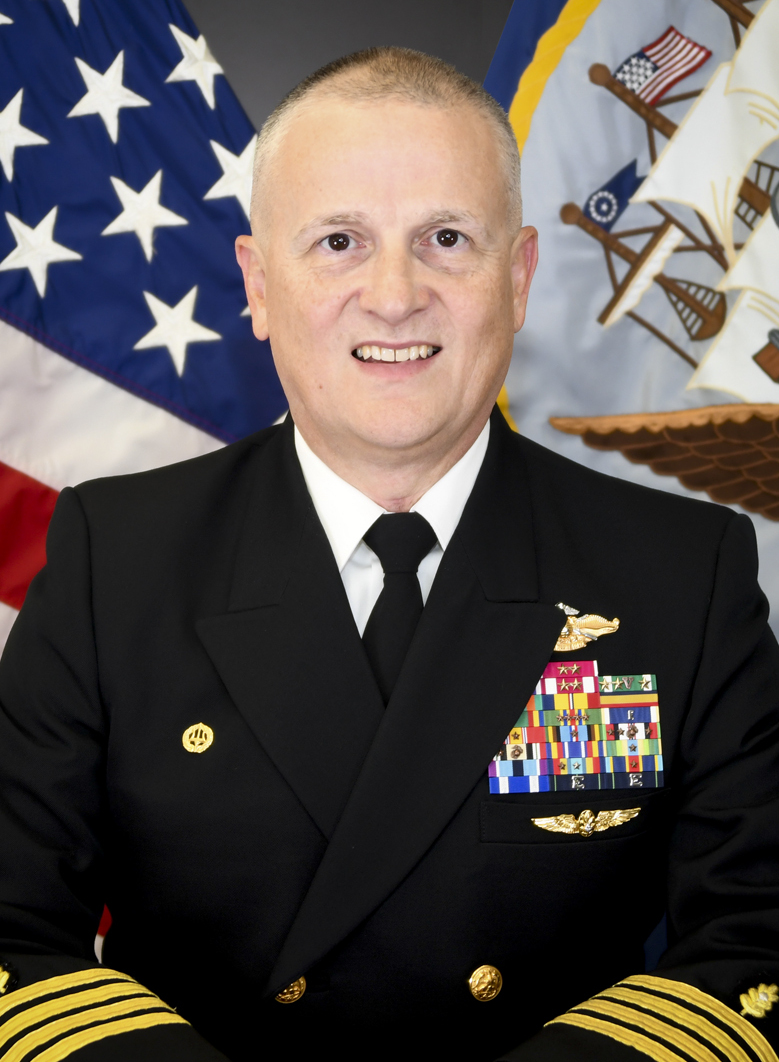
- Incumbent; Sean Barbabella since March 7, 2025
- Executive Branch of the U.S. Government; Executive Office of the President
- Appointer: The president

The physician to the president is the formal and official title of the physician whom the president of the United States chooses to be their personal physician. The physician to the president and the director of the White House Medical Unit are separate positions, a unit of the White House Military Office responsible for the medical needs of the president of the United States, vice president, White House staff, and visitors. The physician to the president is also the chief White House physician.

== History ==
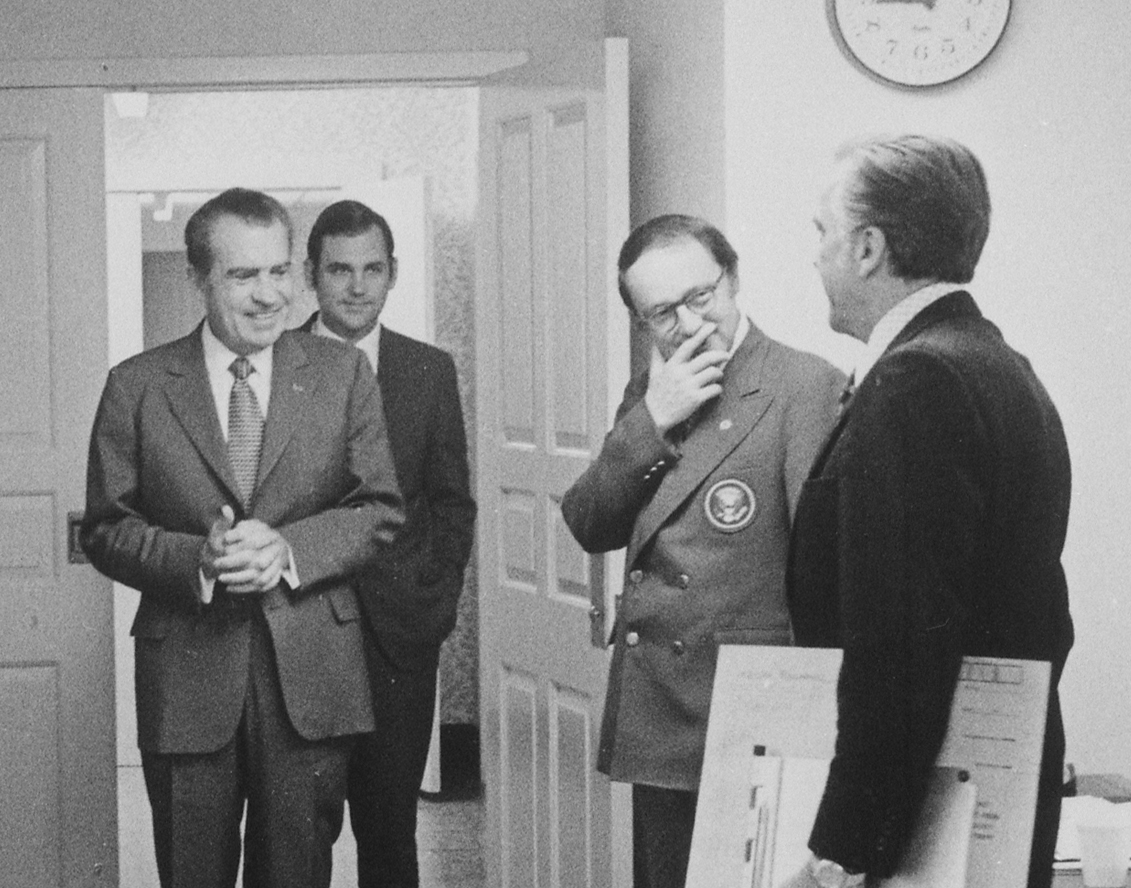
Major General Walter R. Tkach (second from right), physician to the president, at Bethesda Naval Hospital in 1973

Doctors who have treated the president of the United States have had a variety of titles. Presley Marion Rixey (1852-1928), a medical inspector in the United States Navy, was the first individual to serve in a full-time capacity beginning in 1901, and is notable for serving as physician to Presidents William McKinley and Theodore Roosevelt. However, the formal title "White House Physician" was not established until after his tenure. This title was created by an act of Congress in 1928.

== Organization and role ==
The White House physician has an office inside the White House. The location of their medical unit plays an important role in keeping the president of the United States healthy. They also oversee a staff that is typically composed of five military physicians, five physician assistants, five nurses, three paramedics, three administrators, and one IT manager. The physician to the president is metaphorically the "shadow of the president" because they (or one of the physicians assigned to the White House Medical Unit) are always close at hand whether the president is at the White House, overseas, on the campaign trail, or aboard presidential plane Air Force One; Daniel Ruge, for example, was nearby during the attempted assassination of Ronald Reagan in 1981, and supervised the president's immediate treatment.

The physician to the president protects the president's health. The physician to the president, together with the director of the White House Medical Unit, is also responsible for managing comprehensive medical care for the members of the president's immediate family, the vice president, and the vice president's family and providing the medical support to ensure the continuity of the presidency. The physician may also provide medical care and attention to the more than 1.5 million visitors who tour the White House each year, as well as to international dignitaries and other guests of the president.

The medical office of the White House doctor is a "mini urgent-care center" containing a physician's office, private examination rooms, basic medications and medical supplies, and a crash cart for emergency resuscitation. Air Force One is equipped with emergency medical equipment, an operating table, and operating room lights installed at the center of the presidential plane for emergency use by the White House doctor.

Ruge resigned after Reagan's first term and called his job "vastly overrated, boring and not medically challenging". Due to lack of space, Ruge could not attend most state dinners. He nonetheless had to be ready for emergencies and usually waited alone in his office wearing a tuxedo. However, Ruge stated that an advantage was that because of the position's prestige, "[a] president's physician can ask for anything, and he will get it. No doctor will refuse a request to consult". The White House physician can enter the Oval Office or Executive Residence at any time; Ruge sometimes invited experts visiting Washington to examine the president.

=== Selection of the physician ===
The White House physician is often selected personally by the president, and most White House doctors are active-duty military officers, partly because most civilians would find closing and later reopening their private practices difficult. Ruge was about to retire when Reagan chose him as his physician.

As of March 2025, Captain Sean P. Barbabella, DO, MC, USN, is the incumbent White House physician.

== White House physicians ==
No.	Portrait	Physician to the President	Took office	Left office	President	Ref.
1	Samuel Bard	Samuel Bard	1789	1789	George Washington	
2	James Craik	James Craik	1789	1797	George Washington	
3	Leonard Wood	Leonard Wood	1895	1898	Grover Cleveland; William McKinley	
4	Rear Admiral Cary T. Grayson	Rear Admiral Cary T. Grayson	1913	1921	Woodrow Wilson	
5	Charles E. Sawyer	Charles E. Sawyer	1921	1923	Warren Harding	
6	Major James Francis Coupal	Major James Francis Coupal	1923	1929	Calvin Coolidge	
7	Commander Joel T. Boone	Commander Joel T. Boone	1929	1933	Calvin Coolidge; Franklin Roosevelt	
8	Vice Admiral Ross T. McIntire	Vice Admiral Ross T. McIntire	1933	1944	Franklin Roosevelt	
9	Lieutenant Commander Howard G. Bruenn	Lieutenant Commander Howard G. Bruenn	1944	1945	Franklin Roosevelt	
10	Major General Wallace H. Graham	Major General Wallace H. Graham	1945	1953	Harry Truman	
11	Major General Howard M. Snyder	Major General Howard M. Snyder	1953	1961	Dwight Eisenhower	
12	Janet G. Travell	Janet G. Travell	1961	1963	John F. Kennedy	
13	Vice Admiral George G. Burkley	Vice Admiral George G. Burkley	1963	1969	John F. Kennedy; Lyndon Johnson	
14	Major General Walter R. Tkach	Major General Walter R. Tkach	1969	1974	Richard Nixon; Gerald Ford	
15	Rear Admiral William M. Lukash	Rear Admiral William M. Lukash	1974	1981	Gerald Ford; Jimmy Carter	
16	Daniel Ruge	Daniel Ruge	1981	1985	Ronald Reagan	
17	T. Burton Smith	T. Burton Smith	1985	1986	Ronald Reagan	
18	John E. Hutton, Jr.	John E. Hutton, Jr.	1986	1987	Ronald Reagan	
19	Colonel Lawrence C. Mohr Jr.	Colonel Lawrence C. Mohr Jr.	1987	1993	Ronald Reagan; George H. W. Bush	
20	Burton J. Lee III	Burton J. Lee III	1989	1993	George H. W. Bush; Bill Clinton	
21	Rear Admiral Eleanor Mariano	Rear Admiral Eleanor Mariano	1993	2001	Bill Clinton; George W. Bush	
22	Brigadier General Richard Tubb	Brigadier General Richard Tubb	2001	2009	George W. Bush	
23	Captain Jeffrey Kuhlman	Captain Jeffrey Kuhlman	2009	2013	Barack Obama	
24	Rear Admiral Ronny Jackson	Rear Admiral Ronny Jackson	2013	2018	Barack Obama; Donald Trump	(Note: Jackson was a captain at the time of his appointment and was promoted to rear admiral partway through his tenure. The Senate confirmed his promotion on July 13, 2016. The Navy demoted Jackson to captain in July, 2022.)
25	Commander Sean Conley	Commander Sean Conley	2018	2021	Donald Trump; Joe Biden	
26	Colonel Kevin O'Connor	Colonel Kevin O'Connor	2021	2025	Joe Biden; Donald Trump	
27	Captain Sean Barbabella	Captain Sean Barbabella	2025	N/A	Donald Trump	

== Bibliography ==
- Deppisch, Ludwig M. The White House Physician: A History From Washington to George W. Bush. Jefferson, NC: McFarland, 2007.
- Evans, Hugh E. The Hidden Campaign: FDR's Health and the 1944 Election. Armonk, NY: Sharpe, 2002.
- Ferrell, Robert H. The Dying President: Franklin D. Roosevelt, 1944-1945. Columbia, MO: University of Missouri Press, 1998.
- Ferrell, Robert H. Ill-Advised: Presidential Health and Public Trust. Columbia, MO: University of Missouri Press, 1992.
- Joynt, Robert J. and Toole, James F. Presidential Disability: Papers and Discussions on Inability and Disability Among U.S. Presidents. Woodbridge, Suffolk, UK: University of Rochester Press, 2001.
- Levin, Phyllis Lee. Edith and Woodrow: The Wilson White House. New York: Simon and Schuster, 2001.
- McCullough, David. Truman. New York: Simon and Schuster, 2003.
- Smith, Jean Edward. Eisenhower: In War and Peace. New York: Random House, 2012.
- Steely, Skipper. Pearl Harbor Countdown: Admiral James O. Richardson. Gretna, LA: Pelican Publishing, 2008.
- Ullman, Dana. The Homeopathic Revolution: Why Famous People and Cultural Heroes Choose Homeopathy. Berkeley, CA: North Atlantic Books, 2007.
