= White House Medical Unit =

Unit of the White House Military Office

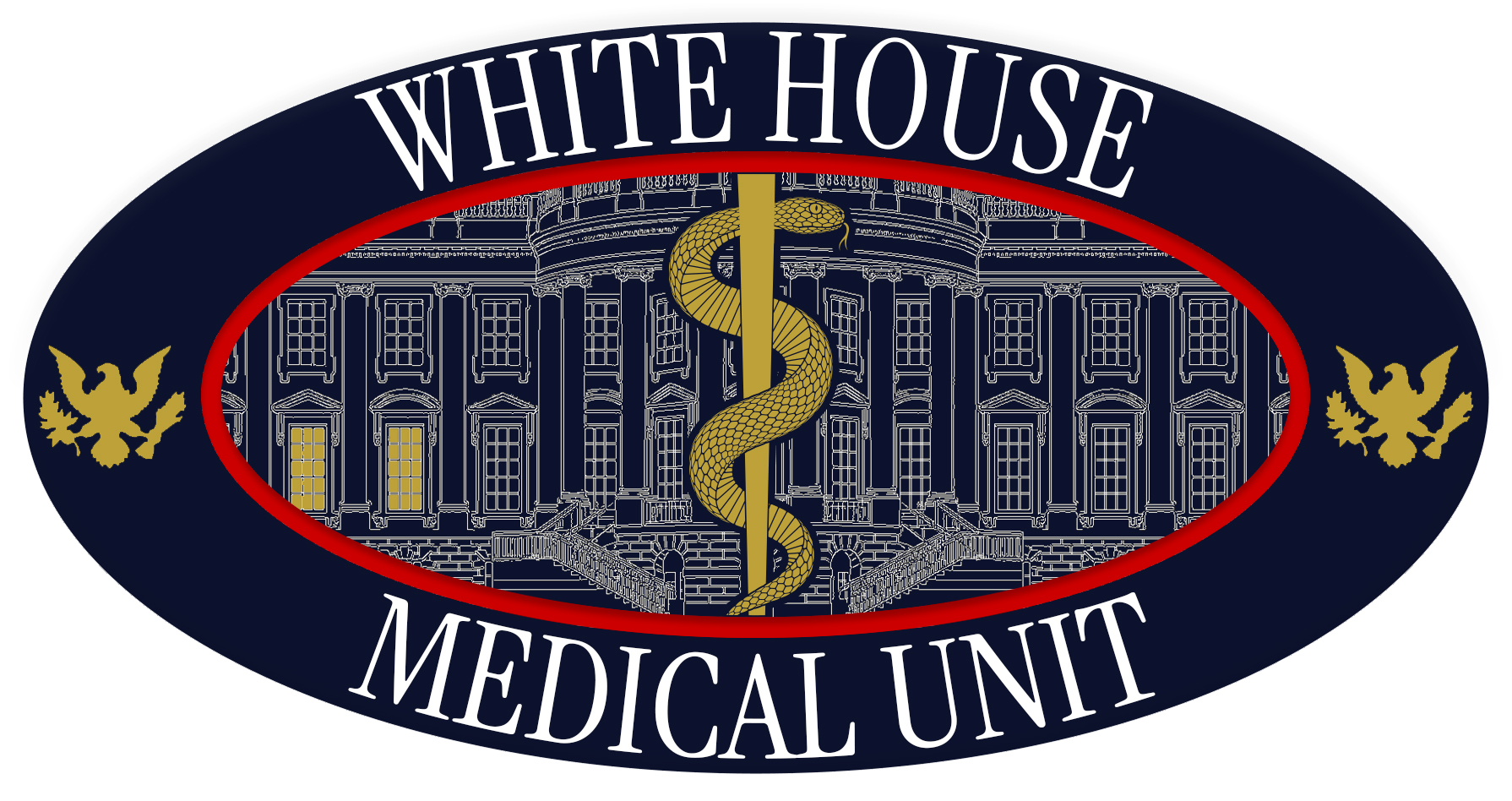
- Abbreviation: WHMU
- Location: White House, Washington, D.C.
- Director: Sean Barbabella
- Staff: 53

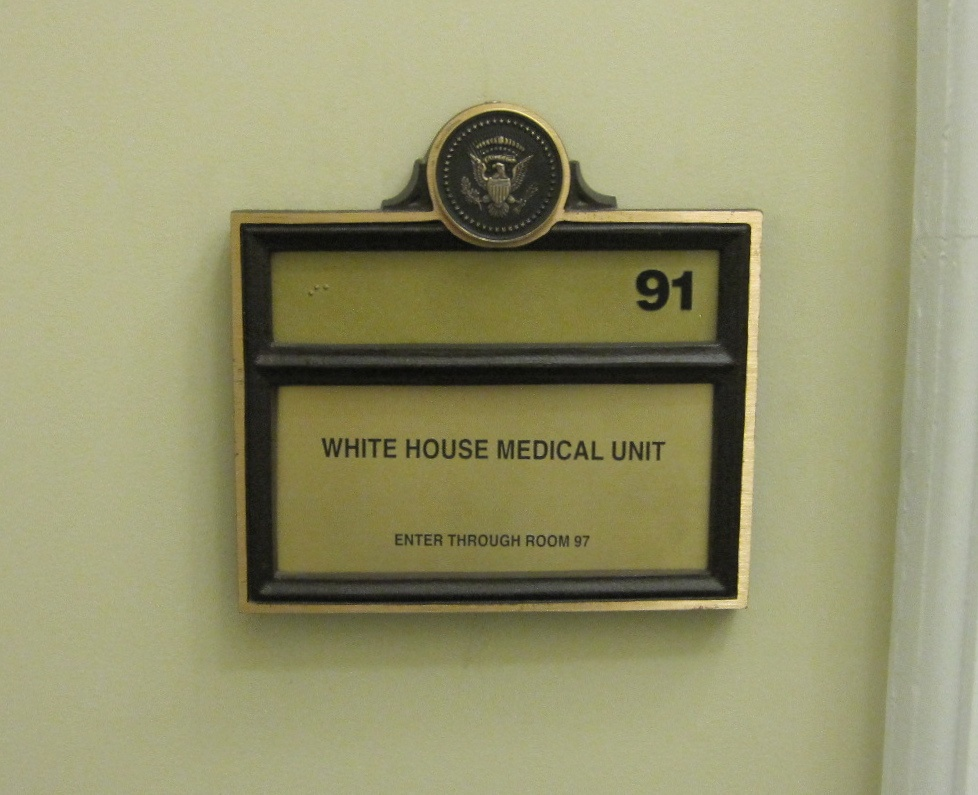
White House Medical Unit door placard inside the Eisenhower Executive Office Building.

The White House Medical Unit (WHMU) is a unit of the White House Military Office and is responsible for the medical needs of White House staff and visitors. The WHMU is led by the director of the White House Medical Unit, typically a military O-6 (a US Army or Air Force colonel or a US Navy captain). The current physician to the president is US Navy captain Sean Barbabella, DO. The unit also provides medical care to the president, the vice president, their families, and international dignitaries visiting the White House.

== Duties and roles ==
The physician to the president is chosen personally by the president and is primarily responsible for the health of the president as a person, while the director is formally appointed by the director of the White House Military Office and is responsible for ensuring the optimal programs are in place to provide health and medical support to the continuity of the presidency to include care for those who support the duties of the president.

The medical unit includes active-duty military physicians as well as several physician assistants, registered nurses, and medics, and support staff including an administrator and a medical information technology manager. (Note: Physicians in private practice are not barred from becoming a member of the White House Medical Unit staff. But since few physicians can afford to abandon their private practice for four years, military physicians have almost always filled the position.) Under implementing guidelines for the Twenty-fifth Amendment to the United States Constitution, the WHMU Director is the primary official responsible for advising the president's Cabinet on the ability of the president of the United States to discharge the powers and duties of the office. The final decision, however, rests with the Cabinet as a political, not a medical, decision. The WHMU provides healthcare to the president, vice president, and their immediate families, as designees of the secretary of defense, who are eligible for medical care at American military medical facilities anywhere in the world. Just as with any other military beneficiary, if any of these officials or family members have health insurance, which they generally do as government employees, inpatient medical care at American military hospitals is billed to this health insurance.

In addition to direct care duties as outlined above, the WHMU is responsible for all medical contingency planning for the White House and its key personnel under its mission of supporting the continuity of the presidency. This includes preparing for every presidential or vice presidential trip by developing medical contingency plans, including the identification of hospitals and other facilities at which medical care could be provided. The goal is to ensure that the president is never more than 20 ground minutes away from a hospital with high level (generally a level 1) trauma center. If this is not possible, the WHMU working with the White House Military Office and the United States Secret Service, ensures that a military helicopter is nearby, kept in instant readiness to evacuate the president to an appropriate hospital.

== Staff ==
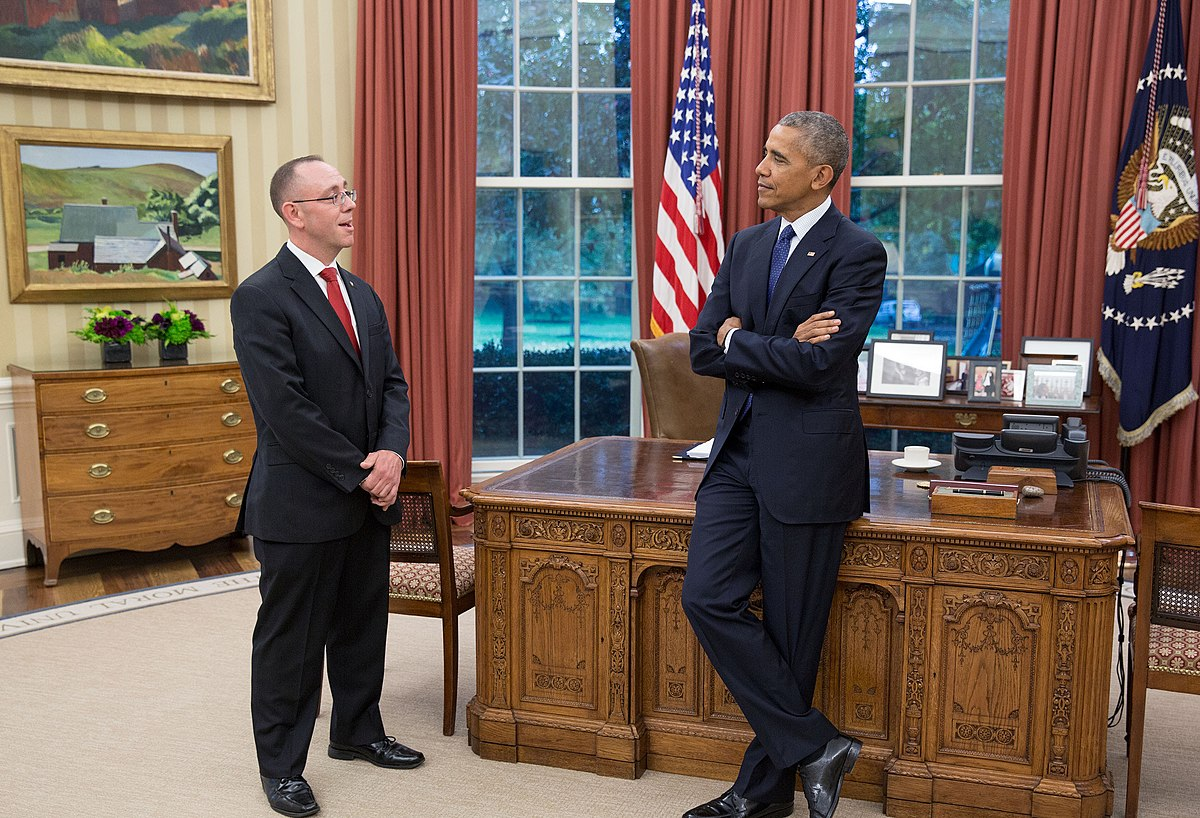
President Obama meets with a member of the White House Medical Unit in 2016

The total number of staff on duty at the White House Medical Unit varies over time. From 1993-2001 there were 20 staff members. During 2001 it increased to 22 total staff. By 2010, 24 total staff members existed, while by 2019, the WHMU staff had grown to 60 medical personnel. Although the number of physician assistants is not clear, as of 2012 there were five physicians and three medics assigned to the unit. (Note: The number of physicians appears not to have changed since 2009.) As of 2001, there were six registered nurses assigned to the WHMU, each of whom served a two-year term and was trained and certified in providing emergency care, resuscitation, and trauma care.

WHMU staff are board-certified in the fields of emergency medicine, family medicine, or internal medicine. All staff also have certification in trauma care and the provision of cardiac life support. According to a 2009 news report, doctors accepted for assignment to the WHMU undergo a full year of trauma care training before joining the staff.

At least one physician is on duty in the Executive Residence at all times.

Medical staff typically wear civilian street and medical clothing. Military uniforms could draw unwanted attention and increase the risk of sniper targeting when in close proximity to the President, which would prevent the WHMU staff from performing their jobs during an emergency.

== Facilities ==
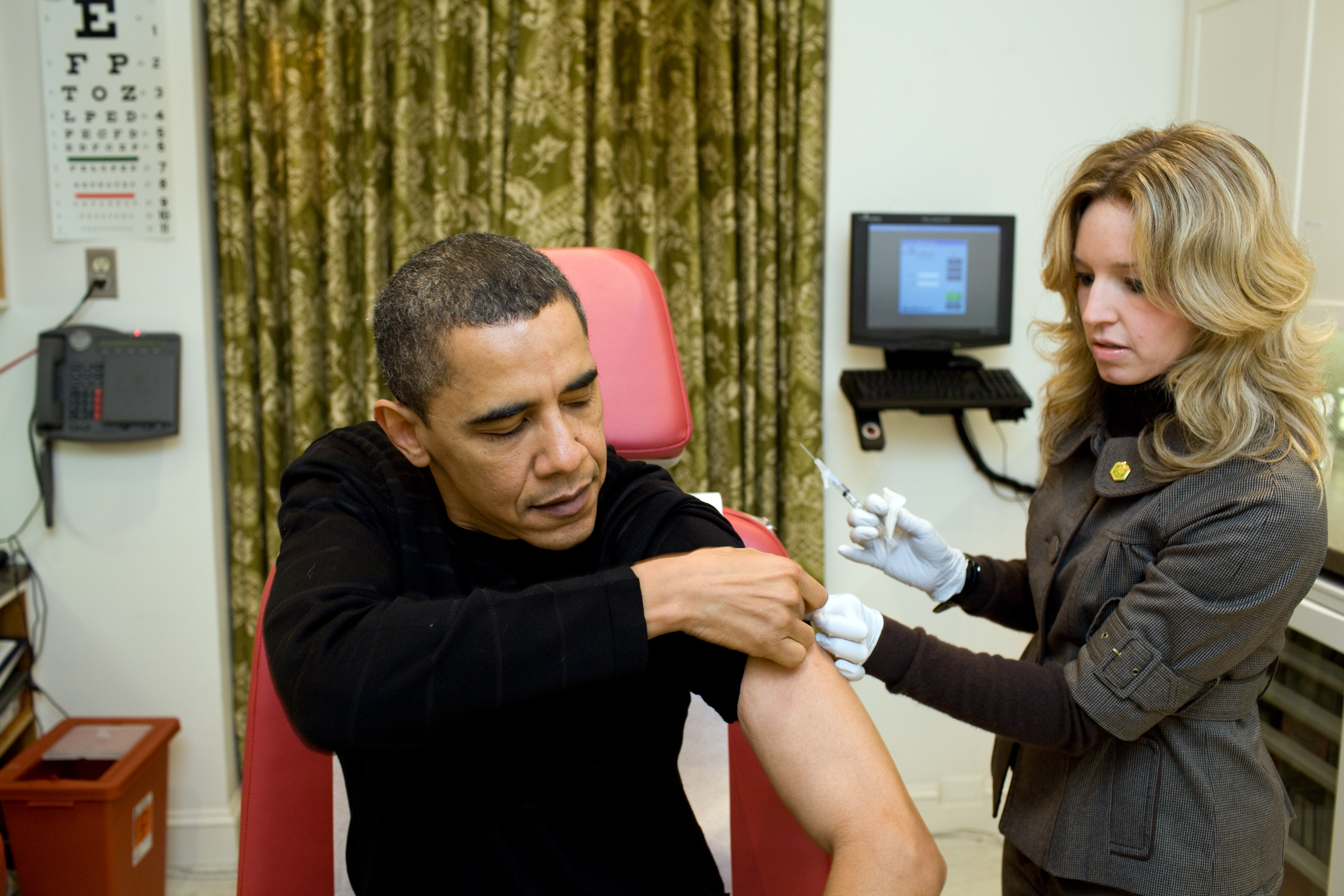
President Barack Obama receives a vaccination from a registered nurse in the White House Medical Unit in 2009.

The White House Medical Unit includes emergency medical and trauma capability at both the White House and the residence of the vice president of the United States at the United States Naval Observatory. One former physician to the president described the White House unit as an urgent care center with a crash cart. A medical examination room is also maintained at the Eisenhower Executive Office Building.

The medical unit also comprises a pharmacy, which duties include to provide pharmaceutical services to senior officials and staff, store, inventory, prescribe, dispense, and dispose of prescription medications, including opioids and sleep medications. However, it was not staffed by a licensed pharmacist or pharmacy support staff, nor was it credentialed by any outside agency.

Between 1993 and 2001, Rear Admiral Eleanor Mariano reoriented the WHMU more toward the provision of emergency medical services. The unit also began to provide 24-hour care at the White House, and added a medical suite to the vice presidential residence to provide the vice president with the same level of care provided to the president. A physician now staffs the vice presidential medical suite at all times. Because jet lag and extremely long hours are common among WHMU staff, a rule limiting staff to 24-hour duty periods was also implemented, and shift rotations created to allow advance medical team staff to take over from traveling staff to limit fatigue.

Between 2002 and 2009, the WHMU implemented a program to provide medical training specific to the international locales which the president or vice president might travel. This training helps prepare the medical staff for specific or unusual medical situations needed in each place the president or vice president visits.

The WHMU also oversees the mobile medical suite aboard Air Force One and Air Force Two. Air Force One contains a full surgical suite with operating table, two beds, resuscitation equipment, various medical monitors, and a full pharmacy. Air Force Two contains a first aid unit as well as an automated external defibrillator, oxygen tanks, and limited pharmaceuticals. The WHMU also establishes temporary emergency medical facilities as needed to support presidential or vice presidential trips. These usually consist of an eight-member intensive care and surgical team, and a temporary operating room at each stop. WHMU staff may also carry operating room equipment in backpacks to provide emergency medical care as needed on-site when the temporary operating room is too distant. When the president travels overseas, an advance medical team travel ahead of Air Force One to set up its medical facilities days in advance. This way, a fully rested medical team is available to assist the president upon arrival and take over from the team which traveled aboard the presidential aircraft.

A physician and nurse also travel with presidential motorcades. They are strategically positioned so as to be close enough to respond to an emergency but far enough away to minimize the likelihood of being caught in the event.

A WHMU physician and nurse also usually accompany the first lady of the United States when she travels, but a full medical staff and mobile operating suite are not assigned to her.

=== 2020 Coronavirus participation ===
The White House Medical Unit handled temperature checks for journalists and others as White House moved limited seating to all briefings.

=== 2024 Patient Eligibility and Pharmaceutical Management Report ===
In January 2024, the Department of Defense Office of Inspector General published an evaluation of internal controls related to patient eligibility and pharmaceutical management within the executive medicine services in the National Capital Region, including the White House Medical Unit (WHMU). The investigation interviewed military officials who worked in the White House between 2009 and 2018; however, it heavily focused on prescription drug records and care between 2017 and 2019 during the Trump administration.

The report found that the WHMU's pharmaceutical operations differed from other executive medicine clinics, as it independently procured, stored, prescribed, and dispensed medications. According to the OIG, these operations exhibited "severe and systemic problems," including inadequate internal controls, lack of external accreditation, and insufficient oversight by senior Military Health System leadership. Additionally, the report identified issues in pharmaceutical management practices, including improper recordkeeping, prescribing and dispensing practices that did not meet regulatory standards, and procurement of brand-name medications in place of lower-cost generic equivalents.

The OIG issued multiple recommendations, including the development of formal policies for pharmaceutical management, improved oversight of eligibility determinations, and the establishment of billing and cost-recovery mechanisms. Department of Defense leadership agreed with the recommendations, which were considered resolved but remained open pending verification of implementation.

In January 2025, the Department of Defense issued DoD Instruction 6000.21, which established policies, responsibilities, and procedures for administering and overseeing health care services provided by the WHMU, including eligibility criteria and oversight within the Military Health System.
