= Saint Louis University Mental Status Exam =

Screening tool for detecting mild cognitive impairment

- Purpose: detect mild cognitive impairment(veterans)

The Saint Louis University Mental Status (SLUMS) Exam is a brief screening assessment used to detect cognitive impairment. It was developed in 2006 at the Saint Louis University School of Medicine Division of Geriatric Medicine, in affiliation with a Veterans' Affairs medical center. The test was initially developed using a veteran population, but has since been adopted as a screening tool for any individual displaying signs of mild cognitive impairment. The intended population typically consists of individuals 60 years and above that display any signs of cognitive deficit. Unlike other widely-used cognitive screens, such as the Mini-Mental State Examination and Montreal Cognitive Assessment, the SLUMS is free to access and use by all healthcare professionals.

== Format ==
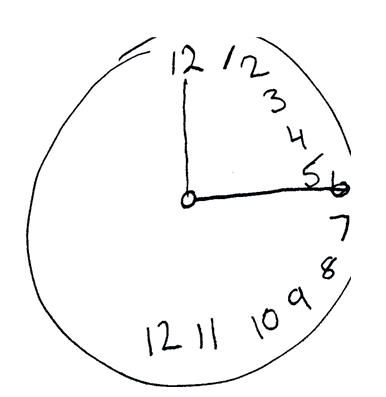
The SLUMS exam requires an individual to draw a clock

The SLUMS includes 11 questions and is scored on a scale of 1-30. The SLUMS exam requires the individual being tested to perform various tasks, including the following:

- Attention tasks
- Arithmetic calculations
- Memory tasks involving immediate and delayed recall
- Naming animals
- Digit span
- Drawing a clock
- Recognizing shapes and sizes
- Recalling details from a story

The SLUMS exam tests several cognitive domains, as listed below:

- Verbal memory (13 points)
- Attention/concentration (5 points)
- Visuospatial/constructional abilities (5 points)
- Language skills (4 points)
- Orientation (3 points)

== Scoring ==
The SLUMS is scored on a scale of 1 to 30, with higher scores being associated with greater functional ability, and lower scores associated with greater cognitive impairment. Scoring is dependent on an individual's education level, with higher scores expected for individuals who have received a high school education.

For individuals with a high school education:

- A score of 27–30 would be expected for someone with normal cognition
- A score of 21–26 would be expected for someone with mild neurocognitive disorder
- A score of 1–20 would be expected for someone with dementia

For individuals with less than high school education:

- A score of 25–30 would be expected for someone with normal cognition
- A score of 20–24 would be expected for someone with mild neurocognitive disorder
- A score of 1–19 would be expected for someone with dementia

== Efficacy ==
While there is relatively little research on the reliability and validity of the SLUMS exam, available studies suggest that it exhibits high sensitivity (greater than 95%) and specificity (greater than 95%) in differentiating between individuals with normal cognition from those with dementia. However, the SLUMS has been to found to be less effective at differentiating between normal individuals from those with mild cognitive impairment.

== See also ==
- Addenbrooke's cognitive examination
- Geriatric medicine
- Mental status examination
- Montreal Cognitive Assessment
- Mini–mental state examination
- Informant Questionnaire on Cognitive Decline in the Elderly
- NIH stroke scale
- Self-administered Gerocognitive Examination
