= Psychiatric interview =

- Purpose: psychiatric assessment

The psychiatric interview refers to the set of tools that a mental health worker (most times a psychiatrist, psychologist, or advanced practice provider but at times social workers or nurses) uses to gather information from the patient to complete a psychiatric assessment. A diagnosis and treatment plan is created based on the psychiatric assessment. The components of the psychiatric interview include a detailed history and mental status examination.

== Goals of the interview ==
The goals of the psychiatric interview are:

- Create a psychologically safe setting for interview.
- Build rapport.
- Collect data about the patient's current difficulties, past psychiatric history and medical history, as well as relevant developmental, interpersonal and social history.
- Conduct mental status examination.
- Diagnose the mental health issue(s).
- Establishing possible differential diagnoses.
- Understand the patient's personality structure, use of defense mechanisms and coping strategies.
- Improve the patient's insight.
- Create a foundation for a therapeutic alliance.
- Foster healing.
- Gather information from collateral sources.

The data collected through the psychiatric interview is mostly subjective, based on the patient's report, and many times can not be corroborated by objective measurements. As such, one the interview's goals is to collect data that is both valid and reliable.

== Interview structure ==
There are 2 main accepted structures a psychiatric interview may follow. These formats use different approaches but aim to gather the same information.

- Fully structured psychiatric interview: This interview follows a set of specific questions, asked in a specific order. The questions are designed to elicit information that conforms to diagnostic criteria specified in the DSM-5. Structured interviews are developed to be more reliable, and can be performed by less experienced interviewers. Structured interviews rely heavily on binary yes or no answers and depend on the patient having some degree of insight into their condition prior to the start of the interview. This structure of interview attempts to elicit objective data from the patient's subjective experience.
- Conversational, semi-structured interview: This interview uses a conversational format in order to gather information on a predetermined list of topics. Questions can be asked and answered in any order to gather this information. Question format is up to the interviewer to decide as the conversation progresses. If the patient responds with yes or no answers, the interviewer must seek further clarification. This style of interview requires an experienced interviewer. This structure of interview attempts to elicit the patient's full, subjective narrative of their condition.

== Components of the interview ==
The psychiatric interview can be an experience that causes the patient shame, so it is important to start the interview by creating a space of psychological safety. The interviewer elicits the patient's chief complaint, or the reason the patient appeared for psychiatric evaluation, as well as symptoms the patient is currently experiencing and possible precipitating factors. The interviewer asks about pertinent medical history, including past medical diagnoses, family history of medical conditions, current medications, and allergies. The interviewer asks about psychiatric history, including psychiatric diagnoses, past psychiatric medication trials, current psychiatric medications, past suicide attempts, past in-patient psychiatric hospitalizations, out-patient psychiatric provider, and family history of psychiatric conditions. The interviewer will ask about social history, including drug use, alcohol use, occupation, family and social support, living situation, trauma history, and stressors. Mental status exam or mini-mental status exam is completed. Based on the information that is gathered, other indicated testing, such as an IQ test, Minnesota Multiphasic Personality Inventory, or Rorschach test, may also be administered during the interview. In a fully structured psychiatric interview, information is gathered in a predetermined order, whereas a conversational interview, information can be gathered in any order, as the patient may become more comfortable sharing information or remember more information as the interview progresses. Information is gathered through the observation of patient behavior, as well as through the information shared by the patient. The gathered information is used to complete a psychiatric assessment in order to determine a diagnosis, differential diagnoses, and treatment plan. Diagnosis is made primarily based on the DSM-5-TR and ICD criteria.

== Considerations ==
Several considerations must be made depending on the presentation of the patient.

- Homicidal ideation: If a patient is expresses thoughts of harming others, the interviewer should take precautions for their own safety. Possible in-patient hospitalization should be considered. The provider must inquire about homicidal ideation, even if it is uncomfortable for the patient. Per Tarasoff v. Regents of the University of California, if a patient makes credible threats of harm to others during an encounter with a provider, the subject of the threats must be informed.
- Suicidal ideation: Suicidality must be evaluated in all patients. It is especially important to evaluate in depressed patients, who have a high risk of suicidal thoughts and behaviors. Other conditions that increase risk for suicidal thoughts and attempts include bipolar disorder, schizophrenia, panic disorder, substance use disorders, and neurocognitive disorders. Other risk factors for suicide include male sex, white or Native American race, and older age. During the interview, it is important to discern between active and passive suicidal ideation and whether the patient has access to means to complete their plan. Patients who are actively suicidal should be hospitalized.
- Agitated patients: If a patient is experiencing agitation, the interviewer should take precautions for their own safety to avoid injury. It is important for the provider to consider hospitalization, sedating medications, and restraints for the safety of the patient, their family and friends, and medical staff. Etiology of the agitation should be determined.
- Delusional patients: If a patient is delusional, it is important that the interviewer does not validate the delusion.

== Challenges ==
Validity refers to how the data compares to an ideal absolute truth that the interviewer needs to access and uncover. Challenges that might affect the interview validity include can be categorized as patient related factors and interviewer related factors.

Patient's related factors include:

- Shame: the patient might feel ashamed to discuss some of their difficulties.
- Fear of being judged: while not ashamed the patient might be reluctant to discuss some of the issues that she thinks that she can be judged for.
- Lack of awareness: patient might have distorted recollection of past events with significant emotional valence.
- Lack of insight: patient may not be cognizant of their condition or symptoms.
- Cognitive deficits: the patient might have a memory deficit that might impair his ability to correctly recall past events.
- Secondary gain/malingering: the patient decided to misrepresent fact in order to gain a certain benefit (e.g. disability benefits) or avoid a certain penalty (e.g. insanity defense).
- Transference: Powerful feelings of like or dislike based on past experiences which the patient may unconsciously have towards the interviewer.
- Education: patient's understanding of interview questions may be affected by their education level.
- Language: patient's proficiency in the language the interview is conducted in may affect their ability to respond to questions fully.

Interviewer related factors include:

- Countertransference: Powerful feelings of like or dislike based on past experiences that unconsciously might affect the interviewer's objectivity.
- Lack of experience: the interviewer lack the skills and knowledge necessary to explore a specific area of pathology.
- Medical jargon: use of complex medical terms by the interviewer may cause the patient confusion and result in an incomplete data collection.
- Diagnostic bias: the interviewer is invested in a specific psychiatric diagnosis (e.g. same patient might be diagnosed with schizophrenia by a schizophrenia researcher or bipolar disorder with psychotic features by a bipolar disorder researcher).

Reliability refers to how datasets collected by different interviewers or the same interview at different times compare with one another. Ideal reliability is when a dataset will be stable irrespective of changes in specifics of the data collection.

Validity and reliability of the interview can be improved by helping the patient communicate their history and symptoms clearly. This can be done through empathetic listening and establishing a strong therapeutic alliance. Different interview techniques have been shown to result in variations in the validity and reliability of the collected data. Open-ended question ("Tell me about your sleep.") have been shown to have better validity but less reliability than closed-ended questions("Do you have sleeping difficulties?")
