= Abbreviated Mental Test Score =

- Purpose: Dementia diagnosis

The Abbreviated Mental Test Score (AMTS) is a 10-point test designed for the rapid assessment of elderly patients for potential dementia. It is recommended as the primary screening tool in emergency and hospital settings for patients over 65. First introduced in 1972, it is now also utilized to assess mental confusion (including delirium) and other cognitive impairments. The test takes approximately 3–4 minutes to administer and requires no specialist training or licensing.

== History ==
The AMTS was developed to address the need for a rapid, practical method of assessing cognitive impairment in geriatric patients. In 1972, Hodkinson adapted it from the 26-item Blessed Dementia Scale (BDS) by removing 16 items: 13 for repetitiveness, 2 for being too easy, and 1 for being too difficult. Validation studies revealed a near-linear correlation between AMTS and BDS scores, indicating strong convergent validity and measurement accuracy.

=== Questionnaire and scoring ===
The standard AMTS consists of 10 questions that assess orientation, memory, and attention. The following questions are put to the patient. Each question correctly answered scores one point. A score of 7–8 or less suggests cognitive impairment at the time of testing, although further and more formal tests are necessary to confirm a diagnosis of dementia, delirium or other causes of cognitive impairment. Culturally-specific questions may vary based on region.

Question
What is your age?
What is the time to the nearest hour?
Give the patient an address, and ask him or her to repeat it at the end of the test.
What is the year?
What is the name of this place (e.g. hospital)?
Can the patient recognize two persons (the doctor, nurse, home help, etc.)?
What is your date of birth?
In what year did World War I start?
Name the current Monarch.
Count backwards from 20 down to 1.

=== Criticism and Calls for Updates ===
The AMTS has been criticised for containing culturally and temporally outdated questions. For example, the World War I question was gradually revised to ask for the start of World War II as fewer elderly patients had direct experience of the earlier conflict; however, even World War II is now beyond the lived experience of many older adults, causing the question to no longer assess time-orientation but rather semantic memory as many patients struggle to answer correctly, not due to cognitive impairment but because of limited personal relevance, reducing the test's diagnostic accuracy. Experts have suggested that recalling distant historical dates is an unreliable measure of cognitive impairment as answers are often confounded by retroactive interference from recent memories.

As no formal administration training is required, many clinicians administer and score the AMTS incorrectly. Score cut-off thresholds for cognitive impairment vary widely from 6–10, undermining the test's diagnostic reliability.

The AMTS poorly distinguishes between dementia and delirium, and lacks sensitivity to detect mild cognitive impairment, making it a poor tool for differentiation and early-stage diagnostics.

Shorter Versions

The AMT4 uses 4 items from the AMTS, with a cut off score of 3 or 4 compared to the usual 8 or 9. The AMT4 is part of the 4AT scale for delirium. The AMT5 includes 5 items. Despite its cut-off score of 4, it is still highly prone to false-positives.

The AMT7 includes 7 items. At a cut-off score of 5, the same sensitivity and specificity levels were observed as in the original AMTS, making it the most reliable short-form version without compromising diagnostic accuracy.

== Validity and reliability ==
The original AMTS has limited cultural validity as it relies on UK-specific knowledge, such as naming the current Monarch. This limits its generalisability to non-UK settings, requiring countries to adapt questions to avoid misdiagnosis. It also has limited construct validity as some items no longer test time-orientation but factual crystal intelligence, requiring questions to be adapted to more recent events.

Despite these limitations, the AMTS demonstrates strong convergent validity between different diagnostic tools and versions. High test-retest reliability makes the AMTS more applicable by producing consistent results over time, allowing clinicians to reliably track changes in cognitive function.

Comparison to Other Tools

The AMTS has been shown to outperform tests like the Digit Span Backwards Test, Time and Change Test, IQCODE, SPMSQ, and the frequently used MMSE in general hospital settings by exhibiting high diagnostic accuracy, ease of use, and brevity. The AMTS show strong convergent validity with MMSE scores while taking 3–4 minutes to administer rather than 10–15. Unlike many other cognitive tests, the AMTS is not significantly influenced by the patient's education level, making it suitable for diagnosing dementia in individuals with limited literacy.

However, the AMTS is less effective at detecting mild cognitive impairment, missing over half of cases compared to the MoCA which provides a more comprehensive cognitive profile. The AMTS's narrow focus on memory and orientation leads to a ceiling effect, reducing its usefulness for early cognitive impairment detection.

International Adaptations

The AMTS demonstrates strong reliability and validity across different cultures, with most versions using similar cut-off scores to identify cognitive impairment.

=== Hong Kong ===
The AMTS was adapted in Hong Kong by replacing the World War I question with the Mid-Autumn Festival and the Monarch's name with the current Chinese leader. The adapted version had a cut-off score of 7, with high sensitivity (92%) and specificity (87%), indicating strong validity. It also demonstrated high internal consistency and test-retest reliability, making it an effective cognitive screening tool.

=== Iran ===
In Iran, the AMTS's World War I question was replaced with the Iraqi-Iranian War and the Monarch's name with the Iranian leader.

The Persian version was confirmed to have high statistical validity, specificity, and sensitivity. It proved more applicable than the MMSE in Iran due to its brevity and lack of licensing requirements, making it suitable for over-crowded and under-funded hospital settings. Additionally, unlike other cognitive tests, results are not affected by education or literacy levels, critical in Iran where many elderly adults lack formal education.

=== Poland ===
The AMTS was adapted in Poland by replacing the World War I question with World War II and the Monarch's name with the Polish President. The Polish version showed a strong correlation with the original AMTS, with no significant differences in sensitivity or specificity, confirming its effectiveness.

=== Thailand ===
In Thailand, the AMTS was adapted by replacing the World War I question with the date of the Great Sorrow, the Monarch's name with the Thai King, and the address recall task with the patient's current address. The last change aimed to reflect cultural norms, as most rural elderly individuals are unfamiliar with memorising arbitrary information like made-up addresses. This alteration has been criticised for shifting the task from testing short-term memory to semantic memory.

Despite these adaptations, the Thai AMTS shows high rates of false-negative diagnoses. Many older adults were unable to provide their birth date or recall the current year due to Thailand's mixed lunar/solar calendar system. These issues highlight the cultural limitations of the AMTS and the need for further adaptation in Thailand.

== See also ==
- General Practitioner Assessment Of Cognition
- GERRI
- Mini-Mental State Examination
