= Informant Questionnaire on Cognitive Decline in the Elderly =

Cognitive functioning test for elderly people

- Synonyms: IQCODE
- Purpose: determine whether that person has declined in cognitive functioning

The Informant Questionnaire on Cognitive Decline in the Elderly (IQCODE) is a questionnaire that can be filled out by a relative or other supporter of an older person to determine whether that person has declined in cognitive functioning. The IQCODE is used as a screening test for dementia. If the person is found to have significant cognitive decline, then this needs to be followed up with a medical examination to determine whether dementia is present.

== Rationale behind the IQCODE ==
Most screening tests for dementia involve a brief list of questions to directly assess cognitive functioning. Probably the best-known dementia screening test of this kind is the mini–mental state examination. A disadvantage of such tests is that they are affected by the person's level of education, familiarity with the dominant language and culture in their country, and level of intelligence before the onset of dementia.

Because of this, cognitive screening tests can falsely indicate dementia in people with lower education, culturally and linguistically diverse backgrounds, and lower intelligence. Cognitive screening tests may also have the opposite problem, falsely indicating that a person does not have dementia, especially if that person had a higher level of education or intelligence originally. The IQCODE attempts to overcome this problem by assessing change from earlier in life, rather than the person's current level of functioning. It does this by making use of the informant's knowledge of both the person's earlier and current cognitive functioning.

== Content ==
The IQCODE lists 26 everyday situations where a person has to use their memory or intelligence. Examples of such situations include: "Remembering where to find things which have been put in a different place from usual" and "Handling money for shopping". Each situation is rated by the informant for amount of change over the previous 10 years, using the following scale: 1. Much improved, 2. A bit improved, 3. Not much change, 4. A bit worse, 5. Much worse.

== Scoring ==
The IQCODE is generally scored by averaging the ratings across the 26 situations. A person who has no cognitive decline will have an average score of 3, while scores of greater than 3 indicate that some decline has occurred. However, some users of the IQCODE have scored it by summing the scores to give a range from 26 to 130.

Various cutoff scores have been used to distinguish dementia from normality. In community samples, cutoff scores for likely dementia have ranged from 3.3 and above to 3.6 and above, while in patient samples the cutoff scores have ranged from 3.4 and above to 4.0 and above.

To improve the detection of dementia, the IQCODE can be used in combination with the Mini-Mental State Examination. A graphical method of combining the two tests has been developed and is known as the Demegraph.

== Validity of the IQCODE ==
The IQCODE has been found to distinguish people who have or do not have dementia. A low score on the IQCODE in a person who does not currently have dementia has also been found to predict that they will develop dementia in the future.

The IQCODE has found to correlate highly with conventional dementia screening tests, such as the Mini-Mental State Examination, and to have moderate correlations with a range of neuropsychological tests. It has also been found to correlate with change in cognitive test scores over time.

The IQCODE has near-zero correlations with a person's level of education or with their intelligence earlier in life. This is in contrast to conventional dementia screening tests like the Mini-Mental State Examination, which are affected by education and intelligence as well as the presence of dementia.

A Cochrane review conducted in 2021 focused on the use of the IQCODE in primary care settings for the detection of dementia was unable to provide any guidance due to a surprising lack of research in this specific area.

== Other versions of the IQCODE ==
The original IQCODE has 26 items. A Short IQCODE has been developed, consisting of the 16 items, and has been found to be as valid as the full version. Because it is briefer and of equal validity, the Short IQCODE can generally be used in preference to the original version.

Because the IQCODE does not require the involvement of the person being assessed, it can be used to assess probable dementia in someone who is unable to be assessed because they have had a stroke, developed delirium or have died. A Retrospective IQCODE has been developed for this purpose.

The IQCODE has been translated into many languages, including Chinese, Danish, Dutch, Finnish, French, Canadian French, German, Italian, Japanese, Korean, Norwegian, Polish, Portuguese, Spanish and Thai.

== See also ==
- Abbreviated mental test score A shorter, 10 question screen for impaired cognition.
- General Practitioner Assessment Of Cognition A brief screening tool designed for General Practitioners and Primary Care Physicians
- Mental status examination
- Montreal Cognitive Assessment
- Self-administered Gerocognitive Examination (SAGE)
