= Frederick Ghahramani =

Canadian businessperson

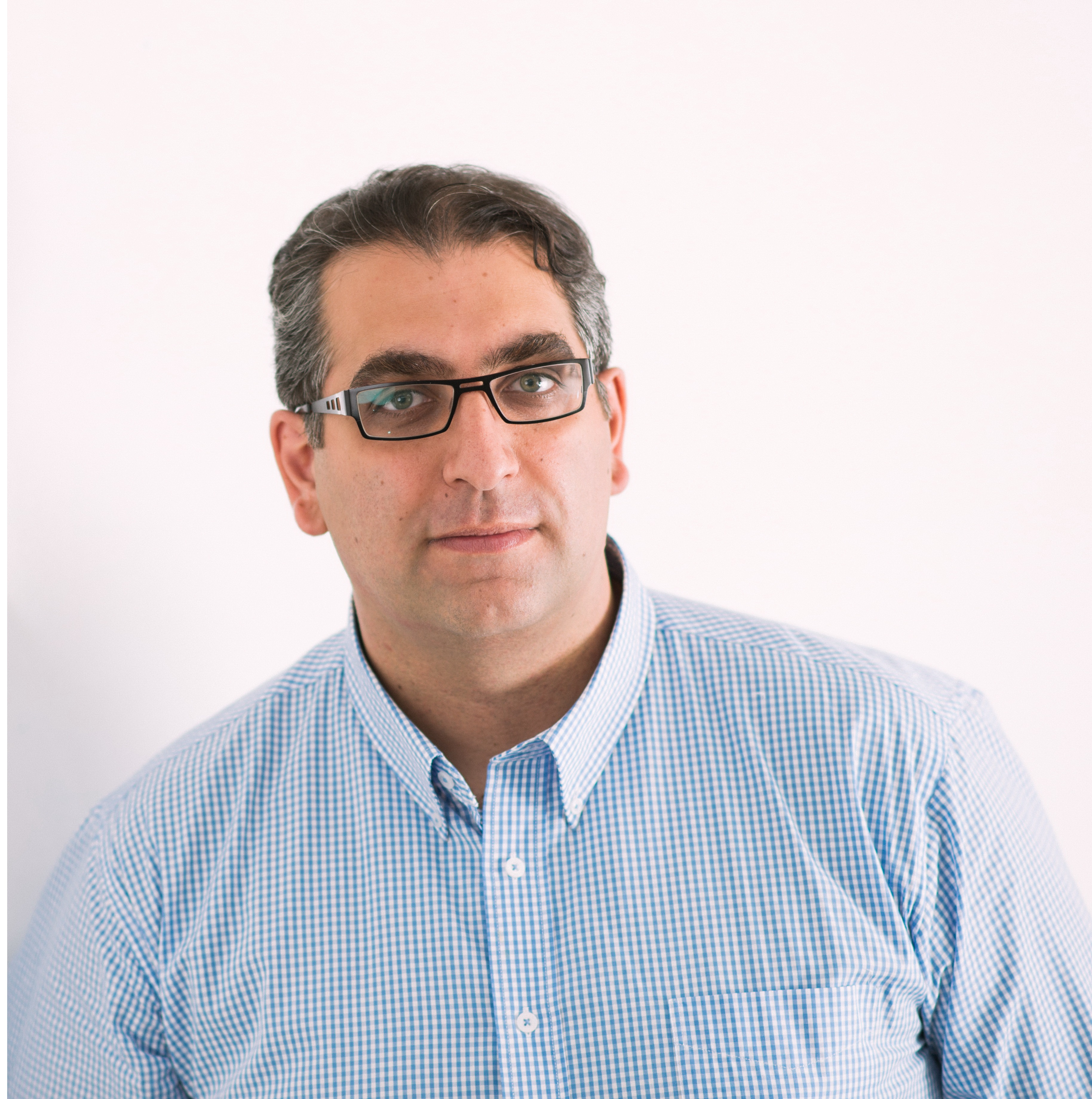
- Education: Simon Fraser University (Electronic Engineering)
- Occupations: Founder of airG Inc. CEO of Just10; Founder of Braintest Ltd.
- Years active: 2000–present
- Board member of: airG Inc. Just10; Braintest Ltd.

Frederick Ghahramani is a Canadian businessperson.

== Education ==
Frederick Ghahramani studied electronics engineering at Simon Fraser University. In 2001, Ghahramani was awarded the BMO Bank of Montreal First Place Prize in the New Ventures B.C. Competition. In 2005, he then received the Business Development Bank of Canada's Young Entrepreneur of the Year Award.

== Career ==
Ghahramani is the founder and Managing Director of airG Inc., a Canadian software company headquartered in Vancouver. He formed the company in April 2000 with his university classmates Bryce Pasechnik and Vincent Yen. Ghahramani was also the founder of Just10, an advertising-free private social network where users are limited to having just 10 friends, and all content, posts, and messages are strictly private, and are permanently deleted in 10 days.

More recently Ghahramani in collaboration with Ohio State University founded BrainTest Ltd, a software company building the digital version of the Self-administered Gerocognitive Examination, a cognitive assessment instrument for mild cognitive impairment (MCI) and early stage dementia.

== Philanthropy ==
In 2012, Ghahramani purchased at auction the controversial oil on canvas painting Emperor Haute Couture by Canadian artist Margaret Sutherland, in order to provide pro bono public viewings of it at educational institutions.

In 2015, Ghahramani donated $1 million to groups fighting to repeal Canada's Anti-terrorism Act, 2015. Recipients of the donation included the Canadian Journalists for Free Expression, OpenMedia.ca, and the Canadian Internet Policy and Public Interest Clinic (CIPPIC) at the University of Ottawa's Faculty of Law. Ghahramani cited his childhood experiences with state surveillance in Iran as a motivation for his philanthropy.

In 2016, Ghahramani along with the Open Society Foundations funded a 130-page report written by Canadian privacy experts at the University of Toronto and University of Ottawa calling for the government to acknowledge and constrain the use of portable surveillance devices that indiscriminately dredge data from people's smartphones.
