= Mental examination =

Mental examination or mental exam may refer to:

- Psychological evaluation
- Mental status examination
