= Self-administered Gerocognitive Examination =

- Purpose: assess mild cognitive impairment

The Self-administered Gerocognitive Examination is a brief cognitive assessment instrument for mild cognitive impairment (MCI) and early dementia, created by Douglas Scharre, Professor of Clinical Neurology and Psychiatry at Ohio State University Wexner Medical Center in Columbus, Ohio.

A digital version exists.

== See also ==
- Addenbrooke's Cognitive Examination
- Mental status examination
- Montreal Cognitive Assessment
- Saint Louis University Mental Status Exam
- Informant Questionnaire on Cognitive Decline in the Elderly
- National Institutes of Health Stroke Scale
