= Mental test =

A mental test may refer to:

- A mental status examination
- A procedure in psychological testing
- An IQ test
- A puzzle
