= Mini–mental state examination =

Test to measure cognitive impairment

Mini–Mental State Examination
- Synonyms: Folstein test
- Purpose: measure cognitive impairment

The Mini–Mental State Examination (MMSE) or Folstein test is a 30-point questionnaire that is used extensively in clinical and research settings to measure cognitive impairment. It is commonly used in medicine and allied health to screen for dementia. It is also used to estimate the severity and progression of cognitive impairment and to follow the course of cognitive changes over time, making it an effective way to document an individual's response to treatment. The MMSE's purpose has been not, on its own, to provide a diagnosis for any particular nosological entity.

Administration of the test takes between 5 and 10 minutes and examines functions including registration (repeating named prompts), attention and calculation, recall, language, ability to follow simple commands and orientation. It was introduced by Folstein et al. in 1975, in order to differentiate organic from functional psychiatric patients but is very similar to, or even directly incorporates, tests which were in use previous to its publication. This test is not a mental status examination. The standard MMSE form published by Psychological Assessment Resources is based on its 1975 conceptualization, with minor subsequent modifications by the authors.

Advantages to the MMSE include requiring no specialized equipment or training for administration, and has both validity and reliability for the diagnosis and longitudinal assessment of Alzheimer's disease. Due to its short administration period and ease of use, it is handy for cognitive assessment in the clinician's office or at the bedside. Disadvantages of the MMSE are that it is affected by demographic factors; age and education exert the greatest effect. The most frequently noted disadvantage of the MMSE is its lack of sensitivity to mild cognitive impairment and its failure to adequately discriminate patients with mild Alzheimer's disease from normal patients. The MMSE has also received criticism regarding its insensitivity to progressive changes occurring with severe Alzheimer's disease. The content of the MMSE is highly verbal, so unable to adequately measure visuospatial and/or constructional praxis. Hence, its utility in detecting impairment caused by focal lesions is uncertain.

Other tests are also used, such as the Hodkinson Abbreviated Mental Test Score (AMTS), Geriatric Mental State Examination (GMS), or the General Practitioner Assessment of Cognition, bedside tests such as the 4AT (which also assesses for delirium), and computerised tests such as CoPs and Mental Attributes Profiling System, as well as longer formal tests for deeper analysis of specific deficits.

== Test features ==
Interlocking pentagons used for the last question

The MMSE test includes simple questions and problems in a number of areas: the time and place of the test, repeating lists of words, arithmetic such as the serial sevens, language use and comprehension, and basic motor skills. For example, one question, derived from the older Bender-Gestalt Test, asks to copy a drawing of two pentagons (shown on the right or above).

A version of the MMSE questionnaire can be found on the British Columbia Ministry of Health website.

Although consistent application of identical questions increases the reliability of comparisons made using the scale, the test can be customized (for example, for use on patients that are blind or partially immobilized.) Also, some have questioned the use of the test on the deaf. However, the number of points assigned per category is usually consistent:

Category	Possible points	Description
Orientation to time	5	From broadest to most narrow. Orientation to time has been correlated with future decline.
Orientation to place	5	From broadest to most narrow. This is sometimes narrowed down to streets, and sometimes to floor.
Registration	3	Repeating named prompts
Attention and calculation	5	Serial sevens, or spelling "world" backwards. It has been suggested that serial sevens may be more appropriate in a population where English is not the first language.
Recall	3	Registration recall
Language	2	Naming a pencil and a watch
Repetition	1	Speaking back a phrase
Complex commands	6	Varies. Can involve drawing figure shown.

== Interpretations ==
Any score of 24 or more (out of 30) indicates a normal cognition. Below this, scores can indicate severe (≤9 points), moderate (10–18 points) or mild (19–23 points) cognitive impairment. The raw score may also need to be corrected for educational attainment and age. Even a maximum score of 30 points can never rule out dementia and there is no strong evidence to support this examination as a stand-alone one-time test for identifying high risk individuals who are likely to develop Alzheimer's. Low to very low scores may correlate closely with the presence of dementia, although other mental disorders can also lead to abnormal findings on MMSE testing. The presence of purely physical problems can also interfere with interpretation if not properly noted; for example, a patient may be physically unable to hear or read instructions properly or may have a motor deficit that affects writing and drawing skills.

In order to maximize the benefits of the MMSE the following recommendations from Tombaugh and McIntyre (1992) should be employed:

1. The MMSE should be used as a screening device for cognitive impairment or a diagnostic adjunct in which a low score indicates the need for further evaluation. It should not serve as the sole criterion for diagnosing dementia or to differentiate between various forms of dementia. However, the MMSE scores may be used to classify the severity of cognitive impairment or to document serial change in dementia patients.
2. The following four cut-off levels should be employed to classify the severity of cognitive impairment: no cognitive impairment 24–30; mild cognitive impairment 19–23; moderate cognitive impairment 10–18; and severe cognitive impairment ≤9.
3. The MMSE should not be used clinically unless the person has at least a grade-eight education and is fluent in English. While this recommendation does not discount the possibility that future research may show that number of years of education constitutes a risk factor for dementia, it does acknowledge the weight of evidence showing that low educational levels substantially increase the likelihood of misclassifying normal subjects as cognitively impaired.
4. Serial sevens and WORLD should not be considered equivalent items. Both items should be administered and the higher of the two should be used. In scoring serial sevens, each number must be independently compared to the prior number to ensure that a single mistake is not unduly penalized. WORLD should be spelled forward (and corrected) prior to spelling it backward.
5. The words "apple", "penny", and "table" should be used for registration and recall. If necessary, the words may be administered up to three times in order to obtain perfect registration, but the score is based on the first trial.
6. The "county" and "where are you" orientation to place questions should be modified: the name of the county where a person lives should be asked rather than the county of the testing site, and the name of the street where the individual lives should be asked rather than the name of the floor where the testing is taking place.

The MMSE may help differentiate different types of dementias. People with Alzheimer's disease may score significantly lower on orientation to time and place as well as recall, compared to those who have dementia with Lewy bodies, vascular dementia, or Parkinson's disease dementia. Furthermore, in Alzheimer's disease and MCI, the MMSE score correlates with electroneurophysiological biomarkers of dementia, such as slowing of EEG activity and changes in evoked potentials.

== Copyright issues ==
The MMSE was first published in 1975 as an appendix to an article written by Marshal F. Folstein, Susan Folstein, and Paul R. McHugh. It was published in Volume 12 of the Journal of Psychiatric Research, published by Pergamon Press. While the MMSE was attached as an appendix to the article, the copyright ownership of the MMSE (to the extent that it contains copyrightable content) remained with the three authors. Pergamon Press was subsequently taken over by Elsevier, who also took over copyright of the Journal of Psychiatric Research.

The authors later transferred all their intellectual property rights, including the copyright of the MMSE, to MiniMental registering the transfer with the U.S. Copyright Office on June 8, 2000. In March 2001, MiniMental entered into an exclusive agreement with Psychological Assessment Resources granting PAR the exclusive rights to publish, license, and manage all intellectual property rights to the MMSE in all media and languages in the world. Despite the many free versions of the test that are available on the internet, PAR claims that the official version is copyrighted and must be ordered only through it. At least one legal expert has claimed that PAR's copyright claims are weak. The enforcement of copyright on the MMSE has been compared to the phenomenon of "stealth" or "submarine" patents, in which a patent applicant waited until an invention gained widespread popularity before allowing the patent to issue, and only then commenced enforcement. Such applications are no longer possible, given changes in patent law. The enforcement of the copyright has led to researchers looking for alternative strategies in assessing cognition.

PAR have also asserted their copyright against an alternative diagnostic test, "Sweet 16", which was designed to avoid the copyright issues surrounding the MMSE. Sweet 16 was a 16-item assessment developed and validated by Tamara Fong and published in March 2011; like the MMSE it included orientation and three-object recall. Assertion of copyright forced the removal of this test from the Internet.

== Editions ==
In February 2010, PAR released a second edition of the MMSE; 10 foreign language translations (French, German, Dutch, Spanish for the US, Spanish for Latin America, European Spanish, Hindi, Russian, Italian, and Simplified Chinese) were also created.

== See also ==
- Abbreviated Mental Test Score (AMTS)
- Addenbrooke's Cognitive Examination (ACE)
- Boston Cognitive Assessment
- Informant Questionnaire on Cognitive Decline in the Elderly (IQCODE)
- Mental status examination (MSE)
- Montreal Cognitive Assessment (MoCA)
- National Institutes of Health Stroke Scale (NIHSS)
- Saint Louis University Mental Status Exam (SLUMS)
- Self-administered Gerocognitive Examination (SAGE)
