= Kingston Arts Council =

Organization

- Kingston Regional Arts Council
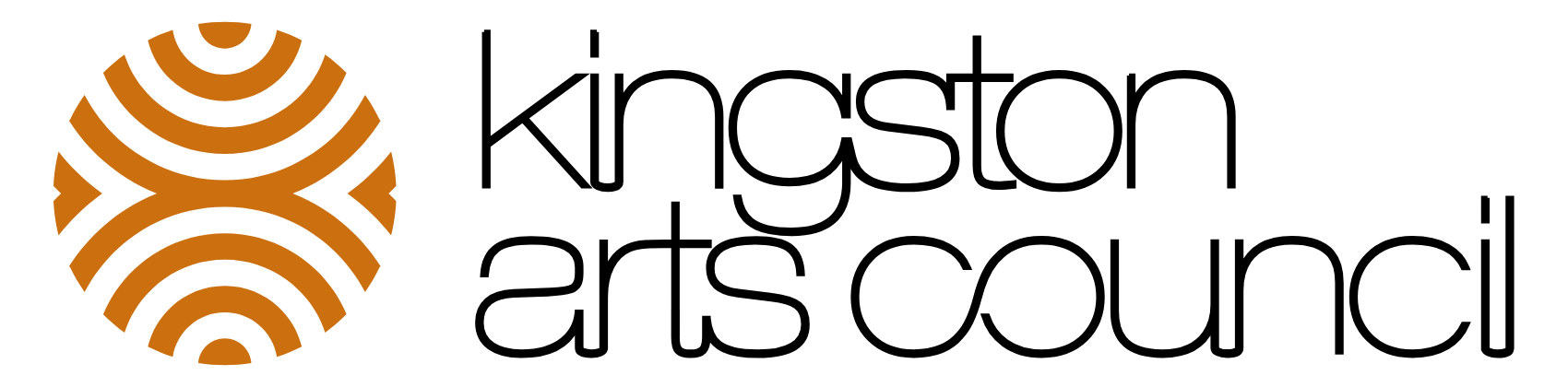
- Abbreviation: KAC
- Formation: 1961
- Type: Non-profit organization
- Legal status: Charity
- Purpose: Arts advocacy, funding, and promotion
- Headquarters: Unit 151 - 370 King Street West. Kingston, Ontario, Canada
- Region served: Kingston and surrounding region
- Executive Director: Nicole Daniels
- Main organ: Board of Directors
- Affiliations: Alliance of Arts Councils of Ontario
- Website: https://artskingston.ca

The Kingston Arts Council (KAC) is the oldest municipal arts council in Ontario, serving Kingston, Ontario and the surrounding region. The KAC administers City of Kingston Arts Fund grants and Nan Yeomans Grant for Artistic Development, advocates on behalf of local artists, produces an annual Arts Guide, and organizes an annual Juried Art Salon in addition to numerous other community arts events and workshops.

== History ==
The Kingston Arts Council was founded in 1961 in response to plans to demolish The Grand Theatre (then known as the Grand Opera House). A group of concerned citizens advocated that the theatre instead become a civic theatre, which was a success (the Grand Theatre reopened in 1964). The Kingston Arts Council adopted its constitution in 1962 and incorporated it in 1963. The KAC has since grown to be a major arts advocacy, funding and promotion resource in Kingston and the area. It receives operating funds from the Ontario Arts Council.

The Kingston Arts Council made national headlines when artist Margaret Sutherland entered the piece "Emperor Haute Couture" in the 2012 Juried Art Salon. This piece portrayed Canadian Prime Minister Stephen Harper in the nude and created controversy due to its subject and its display in the Kingston Frontenac Public Library.
