= Ziad Nasreddine =

Canadian neurologist who created the MoCA cognitive screening test

- Occupations: Director at MoCA Clinic and Institute
- Notable work: Montreal Cognitive Assessment (MoCA)

Ziad Nasreddine is a Canadian neurologist notable for creating the Montreal Cognitive Assessment (MoCA) in 2005, widely used to assess mild cognitive impairment.

== Biography ==
Dr. Nasreddine is a Lebanese-Canadian physician, who graduated with a Medical Degree from the Université de Sherbrooke, Québec, and then completed a fellowship in Cognitive Neurology/Neurobehaviour at UCLA. In 1992, during his residency program, Dr. Nasreddine perceived the need for a more comprehensive cognitive screening adapted for clinicians, and thus developed his first comprehensive cognitive screening test. In 1996, after his fellowship, he decided to adapt his comprehensive screen and create a much quicker comprehensive assessment that is adapted to first-line specialty clinics with a high volume of patients. In 2005, the MoCA test was validated for clinical use. It is since widely used across the world in a variety of settings as this test is easy to administer in about 10 minutes and has been translated into many languages and validated to be accurate. The MoCA is recommended by the Alzheimer Society to objectively assess cognitive complaints in a clinical setting. Dr. Nasreddine has since faced much criticism from fellow physicians for transitioning this free cognitive assessment tool to a monetization model in 2020.
