= Psychiatric assessment =

- Purpose: Ascertain psychological profile

A psychiatric assessment, or psychological screening, is the process of gathering information about a person within a psychiatric service, with the purpose of making a diagnosis. The assessment is usually the first stage of a treatment process, but psychiatric assessments may also be used for various legal purposes. The assessment includes social and biographical information, direct observations, and data from specific psychological tests. It is typically carried out by a psychiatrist, but it can be a multi-disciplinary process involving nurses, psychologists, occupational therapist, social workers, and licensed professional counselors.

== Purpose ==
=== Clinical assessment ===
A psychiatric assessment is most commonly carried out for clinical and therapeutic purposes, to establish a diagnosis and formulation of the individual's problems, and to plan their care and treatment. This may be done in a hospital, in an out-patient setting, or as a home-based assessment.

=== Forensic assessment ===
A forensic psychiatric assessment may have a number of purposes. A forensic assessment may be required of an individual who has been charged with a crime, to establish whether the person has the legal competence to stand trial. If a person with a mental illness is convicted of an offense, a forensic report may be required to inform the Court's sentencing decision, as a mental illness at the time of the offense may be a mitigating factor. A forensic assessment may also take the form of a risk assessment, to comment on the relationship between the person's mental illness and the risk of further violent offenses.

=== Medico-legal assessment ===
A medico-legal psychiatric assessment is required when a psychiatric report is used as evidence in civil litigation, for example in relation to compensation for work-related stress or after a traumatic event such as an accident. The psychiatric assessment may be requested in order to establish a link between the trauma and the victim's psychological condition, or to determine the extent of psychological harm and the amount of compensation to be awarded to the victim.

Medico-legal psychiatric assessments are also utilized in the context of child safety and child protection services. A child psychiatrist's assessment can provide information on the psychological impact of abuse or neglect on a child. A child psychiatrist can carry out an assessment of parenting capacity, taking into consideration the mental state of both the child and the parents, and this may be used by child protective services to decide whether a child should be placed in an alternative care arrangement such as foster care.

== History ==
A standard part of any psychiatric assessment is the obtaining of a body of social, demographic and biographical data known as the history. The standard psychiatric history consists of biographical data (name, age, marital and family contact details, occupation, and first language), the presenting complaint (an account of the onset, nature and development of the individual's current difficulties) and personal history (including birth complications, childhood development, parental care in childhood, educational and employment history, relationship and marital history, and criminal background). The history also includes an enquiry about the individual's current social circumstances, family relationships, current and past use of alcohol and illicit drugs, and the individual's past treatment history (current and past diagnoses, and use of prescribed medication).

The psychiatric history includes an exploration of the individual's culture and ethnicity, as cultural values can influence the way a person and their family communicates psychological distress and responds to a diagnosis of mental illness. Certain behaviors and beliefs may be misinterpreted as features of mental illness by a clinician who is from a different cultural background than the individual being assessed.

This assessment also includes information from related people.

== Mental status examination ==
The mental status examination (MSE) is another core part of any psychiatric assessment. The MSE is a structured way of describing a patient's current state of mind, under the domains of appearance, attitude, behavior, speech, mood and affect, thought process, thought content, perception, cognition (including for example orientation, memory and concentration), insight and judgement. The purpose of the MSE is to obtain a comprehensive cross-sectional description of the patient's mental state. The data are collected through a combination of direct and indirect means: unstructured observation while obtaining the biographical and social information, focused questions about current symptoms, and formalized psychological tests. As with the psychiatric history, the MSE is prone to errors if cultural differences between the examiner and the patient are not taken into account, as different cultural backgrounds may be associated with different norms of interpersonal behavior and emotional expression. The MSE differs from a mini-mental state examination (MMSE) which is a brief neuro-psychological screening test for dementia.

== Physical examination ==
A thorough physical examination is regarded as an integral part of a comprehensive psychiatric assessment. This is because physical illnesses are more common in people with mental disorders, because neurological and other medical conditions may be associated with psychiatric symptoms, and to identify side effects of psychiatric medication. The physical examination would include measurement of body mass index, vital signs such as pulse, blood pressure, temperature and respiratory rate, observation for pallor and nutritional deficiencies, palpation for lymph nodes, palpation of the abdomen for organ enlargement, and examination of the cardiovascular, respiratory and neurological systems.

== Physical investigations ==
Although there are no physiological tests that confirm any mental illness, medical tests may be employed to exclude any co-occurring medical conditions that may present with psychiatric symptoms. These include blood tests measuring TSH to exclude hypo- or hyperthyroidism, basic electrolytes, serum calcium and liver enzymes to rule out a metabolic disturbance, and a full blood count to rule out a systemic infection or chronic disease. The investigation of dementia could include measurement of serum vitamin B-12 levels, serology to exclude syphilis or HIV infection, EEG, and a CT scan or MRI scan. People receiving antipsychotic medication require measurement of plasma glucose and lipid levels to detect a medication-induced metabolic syndrome, and an electrocardiogram to detect iatrogenic cardiac arrhythmias.

== Assessment tools ==
Clinical assessment can be supplemented by the use of symptom scales for specific disorders, such as the Beck Depression Inventory for depression, or the Brief Psychiatric Rating Scale (BPRS) or Positive and Negative Syndrome Scale (PANSS) for psychotic disorders. Scales such as HoNOS or the Global Assessment of Functioning are used to measure global level of functioning and to monitor response to treatment.

== Multidisciplinary assessment ==
Psychiatric assessment in hospital settings is typically a multidisciplinary process, with contributions from psychiatric nurses, occupational therapists, psychologists and social workers. A psychiatrist takes a history and carries out a mental state examination and physical examination as described above. A nursing assessment includes risk assessment (risk of suicide, aggression, absconding from hospital, self-harm, sexual safety in hospital and medication compliance), physical health screening, and obtaining background personal and health information from the person being admitted and their carers. The immediate purpose of the nursing assessment is to determine the required level of care and supervision, and to have a plan to manage disturbed behavior. Assessment could include a visit to the person's home, for direct observation of the social and living environment. The role of a psychologist includes the use of psychological tests: structured diagnostic instruments such as the Millon Clinical Multiaxial Inventory or psychometric tests such as the WISC or WAIS, to assist with diagnosis and formulation of the person's problems. A psychologist might contribute to the team's assessment by providing a psychological formulation or behavioral analysis, which is an analysis, through systematic observation, of the factors which trigger or perpetuate the presenting problems.

== Other perspectives ==
This article describes the assessment process within a medical model, with the collection of supposedly objective data, identification of problems, formulation of a diagnosis leading to a specific treatment, but there are other approaches to the assessment of people with social and emotional difficulties. A family therapy or systemic therapy approach is not concerned with diagnoses but seeks to understand the problem in terms of relationships and communication patterns. The systemic tradition is suspicious of the objectivity of medical assessment, sees the individual's account as a subjective narrative, and sees diagnosis as a socially constructed phenomenon. From a solution focused perspective, the assessment deliberately avoids identification of problems, and seeks to elicit strengths and solutions.

== Criticism ==
Psychiatric assessments have recently been under heavy criticism from a community of experts. Some go as far as saying that. "Yet they are just subjective opinions with no scientific basis and can change over time."

== See also ==
- List of diagnostic classification and rating scales used in psychiatry
- Medical history
- Mental disorder
- Psychiatry
- Seasonal Pattern Assessment Questionnaire
- Psychiatrist
