= Serial sevens =

Clinical cognitive test involving descending subtraction

Serial sevens (or, more generally, the descending subtraction task; DST), where a patient counts down from one hundred by sevens, is a clinical test used to test cognition; for example, to help assess mental status after possible head injury, in suspected cases of dementia or to show sleep inertia. This well-known test, in active documented use since at least 1944, was adopted as part of the mini-mental state examination (MMSE) and the Montreal Cognitive Assessment (MoCA). The test is also used in determining when a patient is becoming unconscious under anaesthetic, for example prior to major dental surgery.

On its own, the inability to perform "serial sevens" is not diagnostic of any particular disorder or impairment, but is generally used as a quick and easy test of concentration and memory in any number of situations where clinicians suspect that these cognitive functions might be affected. Each subtraction is considered as a unit and calculations are made on the basis of the 14 possible correct subtractions, that is 100-93-86-79-72-65-58-51-44-37-30-23-16-9-2.

Similar tests include serial threes where the counting downwards is done by threes, reciting the months of the year in reverse order, or spelling "world" backwards.

A study involving uninjured high school athletes concluded that the serial sevens test is not appropriate when testing for concussion because it lacks specificity; the pass rate is too low to give any meaningful result. The ability to recite the months in reverse order was thought to be a more effective measure because the pass rate was higher for that test in uninjured athletes.

The numbers of the serial sevens test are a recurring motif in Sarah Kane's play 4.48 Psychosis and well as Don Delillo's novel Falling Man.
