= AirG Inc. =

Canadian software company

airG Incorporated
- Company type: Corporation
- Available in: Multilingual
- Founded: 2000
- Headquarters: Vancouver, British Columbia, Canada
- No. of locations: 12
- Founders: Frederick Ghahramani; Vincent Yen; Bryce Pasechnik
- President: Michael Kader
- CEO: Frederick Ghahramani
- Industry: Mobile social network, mobile gaming
- Revenue: $1 billion+
- Employees: 167
- Website: https://corp.airg.com/
- Registration: Open
- Users: 100,000,000+
- Current status: Live
- Written in: C, C++, Objective-C, Perl, mod_perl, Python, JavaScript, Node.js, Pliant, Java, J2ME

airG Incorporated (airG) is a Canadian software company.

== History ==
AirG was founded and incorporated in April 2000 by Frederick Ghahramani, Vincent Yen, and Bryce Pasechnik. as a mobile entertainment content supplier and was headquartered in Vancouver, British Columbia. The company surpassed 20 million customers in 2007, and in 2014 the company surpassed 100 million customers, representing around 40 countries. In 2010 a study determined airG's weekly media time as one of the top 10 most frequented services on mobile phones in the United States.

== Products ==
=== Mobile games ===
airG released AtomicDove, a 'persistent' and 'multiplayer' game, in November 2001. In 2002, AtomicDove generated 100 million minutes of mobile data traffic. The company also developed the multiplayer farming game Big Barn World. Some games were marketed through private networks, while other were marketed internationally.

=== Mobile chat ===
The company was one of the first mobile-only social media networks. airG was the provider of the Sprint 'Games Lobby Lounge'. airG ran Conexion Latina, which was for about one million Spanish speaking customers, and created the Boost Hookt social network.

=== Mobile advertising ===
airG sold just 2% of its 20+ billion mobile advertising impressions in 2006. It then began to use interactive polls, and engagement units specifically to customers based on their profile information. The company has also partnered with sports sponsorship companies like Red Bull.

== Recognition ==
In 2001, airG was awarded the BMO Bank of Montreal First Place Prize in their New Ventures B.C. competition. In 2005 airG's founders won the Young Entrepreneur of the Year award from the Business Development Bank of Canada.
