= The Grand Theatre (Kingston, Ontario) =

Coordinates: 44.2320°N 76.4865°W

The Grand Theatre (Kingston)
- Grand Opera House (1901-2-)
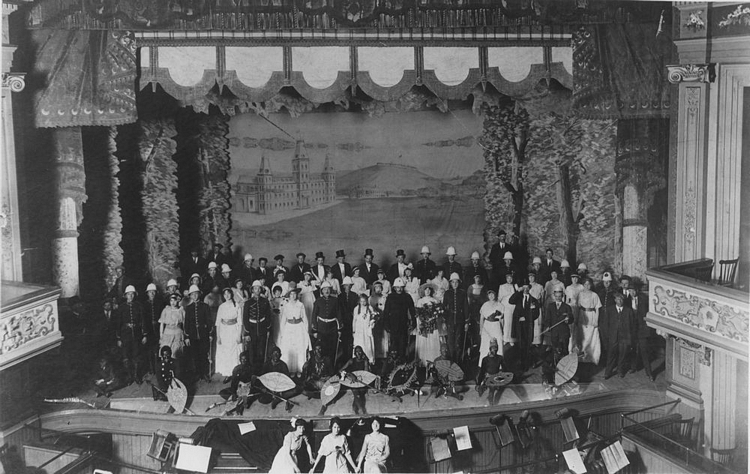
- Leo, the Royal Cadet, The Grand Theatre Jun 3–5 1915
- Interactive map of The Grand Theatre (Kingston)
- Address: 218 Princess Street; Kingston, Ontario; K7L 1B2
- Capacity: 775 (main theatre); 105 (smaller theatra); proscenium stage; orchestra pit
- Current use: Professional and amateur theatre

Construction
- Opened: 1902
- Closed: 1936–1938; 1961–1966;
- Years active: 1902–present

Website
- http://www.kingstongrand.ca/ Official Website of The Grand Theatre

The Grand Theatre is a historic theatre located in Kingston, Ontario, Canada and is currently one of that city's major performing arts venues. It has been the home of the Kingston Symphony since 1964. The main theatre seats 776 people, and has a proscenium stage and an orchestra pit. The building also houses a smaller black box theatre, The Baby Grand, which seats 105 people.

== History ==
Built in 1901–02 on the site of the former Martin's Opera House (built 1879 and destroyed by fire on 6 December 1898), The Grand Theatre was originally known as the Grand Opera House. The theatre's gala performance was on 14 January 1902. From 1905 to 1936 the theatre was owned and operated by impresario Ambrose J. Small. Notable performers to appear at the theatre during its early years included Sarah Bernhardt, Al Jolson, and Nellie Melba. In 1936 the theatre was sold by Small to Famous Players who decided to shut the theatre down and turn the building into a cinema venue. After two years of restoration, the theatre reopened as a movie house on 20 May 1938, and operated in that capacity until the theatre closed again in 1961.

Were it not for a group of concerned citizens forming the Kingston Arts Council, the Grand Theatre would have been demolished in the early 1960s. The Kingston Arts Council successfully campaigned and advocated against demolition and for the theatre to be restored as a civic theatre that would serve as the home of the Kingston Symphony and as a venue for both local and touring groups. Work accordingly began in 1964 and the newly named The Grand Theatre opened its doors on 20 May 1966 with a performance of Dora Mavor Moore's musical revue Spring Thaw. In 1978 a series of ongoing renovations began which established new lounges, higher quality backstage facilities, and The Baby Grand was co-founded by Sarah Garton Stanley and Eric Kaskens in 1985 (and was renovated and reopened in November 1990).
