= Emperor Haute Couture =

2011 painting by Margaret Sutherland

- Artist: Margaret Sutherland
- Year: 2011
- Medium: Oil, on canvas
- Dimensions: 91.44 cm × 152.4 cm (36.00 in × 60.0 in)
- Location: Private Collection, Vancouver, British Columbia, Canada

Emperor Haute Couture is a 2011 Canadian oil-on-canvas painting depicting Stephen Joseph Harper PC MP who served as the 22nd Prime Minister of Canada from 6 February 2006, to 4 November 2015.

The picture was created by Kingston, Ontario-based Canadian artist Margaret Sutherland. After being selected for a public unveiling at the Kingston Arts Council's annual juried salon at the Kingston Frontenac Public Library, the piece garnered widespread media attention.

== Sources of inspiration ==
In 2012, Sutherland revealed in an interview that the title of the painting draws its inspiration from the short story "The Emperor's New Clothes" by Hans Christian Andersen. The painting itself is modeled after the famous painting Olympia by Édouard Manet. Of the many messages in the painting, Sutherland's main inspiration for drawing the portrait was due to the lack of female cabinet ministers in the Harper Government. The woman in the purple suit in the background of the portrait is a representation of former Harper minister Bev Oda.

== Human rights complaint ==
After the initial public unveiling of the painting, Curtis Stewart of St. Albert, Alberta, lodged a human rights complaint against the Kingston Frontenac Public Library at the Ontario Human Rights Tribunal. Stewart's application argued that his rights were infringed when the library chose to display the risque painting as part of a local art show. After seven months, the human rights complaint was dismissed.

== Sale at auction ==
Danielle Potvin bought the painting from the Edward Day Gallery (Toronto) in June 2012 for $5,000. In the fall of 2015, she decided to sell the painting to pay for home renovations and the painting was put for sale for $8,800 in Kijiji in Chicoutimi, Québec, Montréal, Ottawa, Toronto, Edmonton, Calgary and Vancouver. An article from Jana G. Pruden, from the Edmonton Journal (23 November 2015) started a bidding war, which was won by the Vancouver-based technology entrepreneur Frederick Ghahramani. Ghahramani revealed his intention was to share the painting with Canadian high-schools and Universities for no fee, because he felt Sutherland's work is "going to be a Canadian artifact, and does a brilliant job capturing the mood of over 60% of Canadians who felt our Prime Minister didn't want to listen to his own experts."
