= General Practitioner Assessment of Cognition =

- Synonyms: GPCOG
- Purpose: Determine cognitive impairment in elderly

The General Practitioner Assessment of Cognition (GPCOG) is a brief screening test for cognitive impairment introduced by Brodaty et al. in 2002. It was specifically developed for the use in the primary care setting.

== The test ==
The GPCOG consists of both a cognitive test of the patient and an informant interview to increase the predictive power. Both parts can be scored separately, together, or sequentially.

The cognitive test includes nine items: (1) time orientation, clock drawing: (2) numbering and spacing as well as (3) placing hands correctly, (4) awareness of a current news event and recall of a name and an address ( (5) first name, (6) last name, (7) number, (8) street, and (9) suburb). Each correct answer is valid one point leading to a maximum score of 9 (fewer points indicate more impairment). For further information on the scoring of the GPCOG please refer to the section “Scoring the GPCOG”. The informant interview asks six historical questions from an informant/next of kin who knows the patient well. He or she is asked to compare the patient's current function with his/her performance a few years ago. Areas that are covered in the informant interview include memory, word finding difficulties, trouble managing finances, difficulties managing medication independently and needing assistance with transportation.

Administration of the GPCOG takes less than four minutes for the cognitive test and less than two minutes for the informant interview making it a very brief and easy to use screening tool.

== Scoring the GPCOG ==
=== Patient interview ===
Each of the nine items is worth one point. Correct answers are added up, leading to a maximum score of 9. A person who scores 9 on the GPCOG can be considered cognitively intact. Further steps are not required, though re-testing after 12 months is recommended. A score of 5 to 8 indicates some impairment but further information is required. The user/general practitioner is asked to conduct the informant interview. Someone scoring 4 points or less is very likely to have cognitive impairment. There is no need to complete the informant interview. However, the conduction of standard investigations such as lab tests is required to rule out reversible causes of cognitive impairment.

=== Informant interview ===
The informant interview is to be conducted if further information about the patient's function is required (i.e. cognitive test score 5 to 8). It consists of six questions which can be answered with “yes” (=impairment), “no” (=no impairment), “don’t know” or “N/A”. Each question is worth one point. As a “yes” answer indicates impairment it is scored 0, while all other answers score 1 point each; (hence higher scores indicate less impairment).

A score of 0 to 3 in the informant interview in conjunction with a score of 5 to 8 in the patient interview indicates cognitive impairment and requires further investigations such as lab tests to rule out reversible causes of cognitive impairment (see above). If the patient has difficulties in less than 3 areas (i.e. score of 4 to 6) he/she can be considered cognitively intact for the time being. Re-testing in 12 months is recommended though.

== Psychometric properties ==
The psychometric properties of the GPCOG are good. The reliability of the patient section is high. For the informant interview, reliability is satisfactory.

In the original validation sample of 380 participants, the sensitivity of the GPCOG was 0.85, the specificity was 0.86. The positive predictive value was highest in people aged under 75 (0.90) and 0.72 for the total sample. The negative predictive value for the total sample was 0.93 making it a good tool to rule out cognitive impairment. On all measures the GPCOG performed at least as well as the mini–mental state examination (MMSE). Of note, positive and negative predictive values depend on the prevalence of the disorder in the studied population.

== GPCOG vs other screening tools ==
Three recently conducted literature reviews recommend the GPCOG as brief screening tool for GPs. Other recommended tools were the Mini-Cog and the Memory Impairment Screen (MIS).

A recently conducted study in Australia found that the GPCOG in comparison to the MMSE and Rowland Universal Dementia Assessment Scale (RUDAS) was best to rule out dementia in a multicultural cohort of 151 community-dwelling persons. Its sensitivity was higher (98.1) as compared to MMSE and RUDAS (84.3 and 87.7, respectively). The specificity was somewhat smaller than that of the other tools. While the MMSE score in this sample was influenced by the cultural and linguistic background of the participants the GPCOG and RUDAS scores were not. This indicates that the latter are more cultural unspecific screening tools than the MMSE making them especially invaluable in multicultural patient settings.

== Languages ==
The GPCOG was first published in English in 2002. French and Italian versions have been validated since then,. Their performance is similar to that of the English version. A Greek version is currently under evaluation. Translations in other languages such as Spanish, German, Mandarin or Cantonese are available upon request from the author or accessible from the GPCOG website (see section below).

As mentioned above the performance on the GPCOG seems to be independent from one's cultural and linguistic background.

== Web-based version ==
In May 2009, the GPCOG website was launched and is accessible on www.gpcog.com.au. It contains a web-based version of the GPCOG as well as links and tools for GPs dealing with elderly and cognitively impaired patients.

The underlying algorithm of the website scores the test and prompts the user to conduct further investigations if required in accordance with the individual test result. Links to national and international guidelines for the diagnosis and management of dementia in the primary care setting as well as links to Alzheimer Associations in various countries are available. Paper and pencil tests in various languages can be downloaded from that website as well.

As the GPCOG itself, also the website is available in various languages. Its use is free of charge and no registration is required.
