= Addenbrooke's Cognitive Examination =

Neuropsychological test to identify cognitive impairment

- Purpose: test cognitive impairment

The Addenbrooke's Cognitive Examination (ACE) and its subsequent versions (Addenbrooke's Cognitive Examination-Revised, ACE-R and Addenbrooke's Cognitive Examination III, ACE-III) are neuropsychological tests used to identify cognitive impairment in conditions such as dementia.

== History ==
The Addenbrooke's Cognitive Examination was originally developed as a theoretically motivated extension of the mini–mental state examination (MMSE) which attempted to address the neuropsychological omissions and improve the screening performance of the latter.

The ACE encompassed tests of five cognitive domains: attention/orientation, memory, language, verbal fluency, and visuospatial skills. It is scored out of 100, with a higher score denoting better cognitive function. At the recommended cut-off scores of 88 and 82, the ACE was reported to have good sensitivity and specificity for identifying different forms of dementia and other impairments of memory and judgement (0.93 and 0.71; 0.82 and 0.96, respectively). The ACE also incorporated the MMSE, such that this score (out of 30) might also be generated.

The ACE-R was a development of the earlier ACE which also incorporated the MMSE, but had clearly defined subdomain scores.

The ACE-III was developed to improve the performance of certain parts of the test and also to avoid a potential copyright violation by replacing the elements shared with the MMSE.

== Addenbrooke's Cognitive Examination-III ==
The current version of the test is the Addenbrooke's Cognitive Examination-III (ACE-III). This consists of 19 activities which test five cognitive domains: attention, memory, fluency, language and visuospatial processing.

=== Attention ===
Attention is tested by asking the patient for the date including the season and the current location; repeating back three simple words; and serial subtraction. An example is something like "subtract seven from 100 and then continue subtracting seven away from each new number."

=== Memory ===
Memory is tested by asking the patient to recall the three words previously repeated; memorising and recalling a fictional name and address; and recalling widely known historical facts. The memory section is split into five sections scattered throughout the tests.

=== Fluency ===
Fluency is tested by asking the patient to say as many words as they can think of starting with a specified letter within one minute; and naming as many animals as they can think of in one minute. An example of this would be the tester asking the test taker to list every word they can think of that starts with the letter C.

=== Language ===
Language is tested by asking the patient to complete a set of sequenced physical commands using a pencil and piece of paper such as "place the paper on top of the pencil"; to write two grammatically-complete sentences; to repeat several polysyllabic words and two short proverbs; to name the objects shown in 12 line drawings, and answer contextual questions about some of the objects; and to read aloud five commonly-mispronounced words. Language involves ascribing meaning to words and statements so this section consists of simple directions that may involve movements, such as the example of placing the paper on top of the pencil, to see how well they apply meaning. Because language is valuable and important to functioning in society, this section is the longest consisting of seven separate parts.

=== Visuospatial ===
Visuospatial skills are used almost daily to remember directions, addresses, and layout of familiar places. Visuospatial abilities are tested by asking the patient to copy two diagrams; to draw a clock face with the hands set at a specified time; to count sets of dots; and to recognize four letters which are partially obscured.

=== Scoring ===
The results of each activity are scored to give a total score out of 100 (18 points for attention, 26 for memory, 14 for fluency, 26 for language, 16 for visuospatial processing). The score needs to be interpreted in the context of the patient's overall history and examination, but a score of 88 and above is considered normal; below 83 is abnormal; and between 83 and 87 is inconclusive.

=== Validity ===
In the initial validation study the cohort examined (n = 86; AD 28, FTD 33, controls 25) found the ACE-III to be acceptable and relatively quick to administer (15 min). The ACE-III and ACE-R were highly correlated (r = 0.99), and at the previously recommended cut-off scores (88 and 82) the ACE-III was both highly sensitive and specific (at 88/100: 1.00 and 0.96 respectively; at 82/100: 0.93 and 1.00 respectively). At the cut-off of 88, Elamin and colleagues found the ACE-III distinguished early-onset dementia from healthy controls with high sensitivity (0.915) and specificity (0.964), and also from subjective memory impairment with high sensitivity (0.915) and specificity (0.867). The ACE-III has been validated against standard neuropsychological tests and has been shown to be a valid cognitive screening tool for dementia syndromes.

Based on the results of a 2019 Cochrane meta-analysis of available studies the ACE-III should only be used as an adjunct to a full clinical assessment and not alone for the screening of dementia or mild cognitive impairment in patients presenting with or at risk for cognitive decline.

== Translations and localised versions ==
The ACE-III questionnaire has been translated into 19 languages. The English-language version has been localised for users in Australia, India, the United States, the United Kingdom, and New Zealand.

== Mini-ACE ==
In 2014, a shorter version of the ACE-III, the Mini-ACE (M-ACE), was developed and validated. It comprises tests of attention, memory (7-item name and address), letter fluency, clock drawing, and memory recall, and takes under five minutes to administer. The M-ACE is scored out of 30, with a higher score indicating better cognitive function, and has two recommended cut-off scores (25 and 21). The higher cut-off score has both high specificity and sensitivity and is at least five times more likely to have come from a dementia patient than without. A score of 21 or less is almost certainly diagnostic of a dementia syndrome regardless of the clinical setting. It has been found to be superior to the MMSE in diagnostic utility.

Based on the results of a 2019 Cochrane meta-analysis of available studies the Mini-ACE should only be used as an adjunct to a full clinical assessment and not alone for the screening of dementia or mild cognitive impairment in patients presenting with or at risk for cognitive decline.
