= Psychiatric history =

Result of a medical process

A psychiatric history is the result of a medical process where a clinician working in the field of mental health (usually a psychiatrist) systematically records the content of an interview with a patient. This is then combined with the mental status examination to produce a "psychiatric formulation" of the person being examined.

Psychologists take a similar history, often referred to as a psychological history.

This article mainly covers the initial assessment history taking of a patient presenting for the first time with a new complaint.

== Background ==
In the field of medicine a patient history is an account of the significant events in the patient's life that have a relevance to the issue being addressed. The clinician taking the history guides the process in an attempt to achieve a succinct summary of these relevant details. Much of the history is obtained by asking questions. Some of these questions are quite specific, such as, "How old are you?" and others are more open, such as, "How have you been feeling lately?" Although the structure of the interview may appear disjointed, the result is usually under a set of headings which have a worldwide similarity.

== Patient identification ==
The basic details of who the patient is are collected. This includes their age, sex, educational status, religion, occupation, relationship status, address and contact details. This serves several purposes. Firstly, it is necessary information for administrative purposes and for this reason some of this is often taken by clerks. Secondly, the questions are largely non threatening and provide a gentle introduction into the meeting of patient and clinician. Thirdly, it provides a format for individual introduction suitable to the culture. Thus the clinician may start by introducing themselves and then move on to these questions. This initial structure can provide a sense of familiarity for the patient who is stressed about what is happening. It also helps the clinician understand the patient's social situation.

== Source and method of presentation ==
The next step is to determine why the patient is there. How did they get to be in the interview? Were they referred by someone (such as another clinician, a relative or friend, or by the police or the courts) or did they come looking for help? If they were referred by someone then what was that person's reason for the referral. Often such information is provided in a referral letter or by an earlier phone call.

== The main (chief) complaints ==
The clinician next tries to clarify what are the main problems that have brought the patient to be there. Some of this may have already been achieved in the previous section. The patient may have more than one problem and these may be related, such as posttraumatic stress disorder and alcohol abuse or seemingly unrelated, such as panic disorder and premature ejaculation. The patient is unlikely to present a diagnosis and is more likely to describe the nature of their problems in common language.

== History of the presenting complaints (present illness) ==
The clinician then attempts to obtain a clear description of these problems. When did they start? How did they start, suddenly, slowly or in fits and starts? Have they fluctuated over time? What does the patient describe as the essential features of the complaints? Having developed a hypothesis of what may be the diagnosis, the clinician next looks at symptoms that might confirm this hypothesis or lead them to consider another possibility. Much of the mental process for the clinician is involved in this process of hypothesis testing to arrive at a diagnostic formulation that will form the basis of a management plan. The severity of each complaint is assessed and this may include probing questions on sensitive issues such as suicidal thoughts or sexual difficulties.

== History ==
This is divided into the psychiatric history, which looks at any previous episodes of the presenting complaint as well as any other past or ongoing psychiatric problems. The substance (drug) history includes data about patterns of use (mode of administration, age of onset, frequency, amount, last use, medical or psychological complications, history of attempting to quit) for alcohol, tobacco, and illicit drugs. The medical history documents significant illnesses, both past and current, and significant medical events such as head injury, seizures, major surgeries, and major illnesses. A separate sexual history gathers data about sexual orientation and sexual activity. Finally a history of abuse, including physical, emotional, and sexual abuse is obtained from the patient and collateral sources (family members or close family friends) as trauma might not be directly remembered by the patient.

== Family history ==
Many psychiatric disorders have a genetic component and the biological family history is thus relevant. Clinical experience also suggests that a response to treatment may have a genetic component as well. Thus a patient who presents with clinical depression whose mother also suffered from the same disorder and responded well to fluoxetine would indicate that this drug would be more likely to help in the patient's disorder.

Apart from the genetic factors, research has shown that illnesses in the parents such as depression and alcohol abuse are associated with a higher rate of some conditions in the children growing up in that environment. Similar effects are seen with the death of a parent from a protracted illness.

== Developmental history ==
This documents the significant events in the patient's life. Ideally it starts with pre-natal factors such as maternal illnesses or complications with the pregnancy, then documents delivery and early childhood illnesses or problems. It then looks at significant events in the patient's life such as parental separation, abuse, education, psychosexual development, peer relationships, behavioural aspects and any legal complications. It flows then into adulthood with relationship and occupational histories. The aim is to get an overview of who the patient is and what they have experienced in life, both good and bad. Major stresses and transitions such as marriage, parenthood, retirement, death or loss of a partner, and financial success and failure are all important, as is how the patient has dealt with them. Sexual adjustment and problems can be relevant and are often questioned.

== Social history ==
If the information has not already been obtained, the clinician then documents the social circumstances of the patient looking at factors such as finances, housing, relationships, drug and alcohol use, and problems with the law or other authorities. This is also a time to document racial or cultural issues that are relevant to the presenting complaint.

== Review of Systems ==
A psychiatric review of systems may include screening questions directed at identifying or exploring co-morbid psychiatric illnesses or issues (e.g., SIGECAPS mnemonic or PHQ-9 for depression, Generalized Anxiety Disorder 7 for anxiety, DIGFAST mnemonic for mania, or specific questioning around psychoses or other psychiatric complaints. A full review of systems should attempt to identify and list all of the relevant STRESSORS that may be impacting a patient's function and overall health.

== Summary ==
Having collected this information the clinician usually then considers any other factors that might be relevant to the particular patient and enquires about them. Although the gathering of the information may follow the flow of the patient's thoughts rather than those of the clinician, it is not uncommon for the clinician to record the psychiatric history under headings, such as those above, to make it easier for others who will later read it.

Subsequent history taking on reviews concentrates on changes in the levels of symptoms and responses to treatment, including possible side-effects.

== See also ==
- Medical history
- Mental status examination
