= Orientation (mental) =

Function of the mind

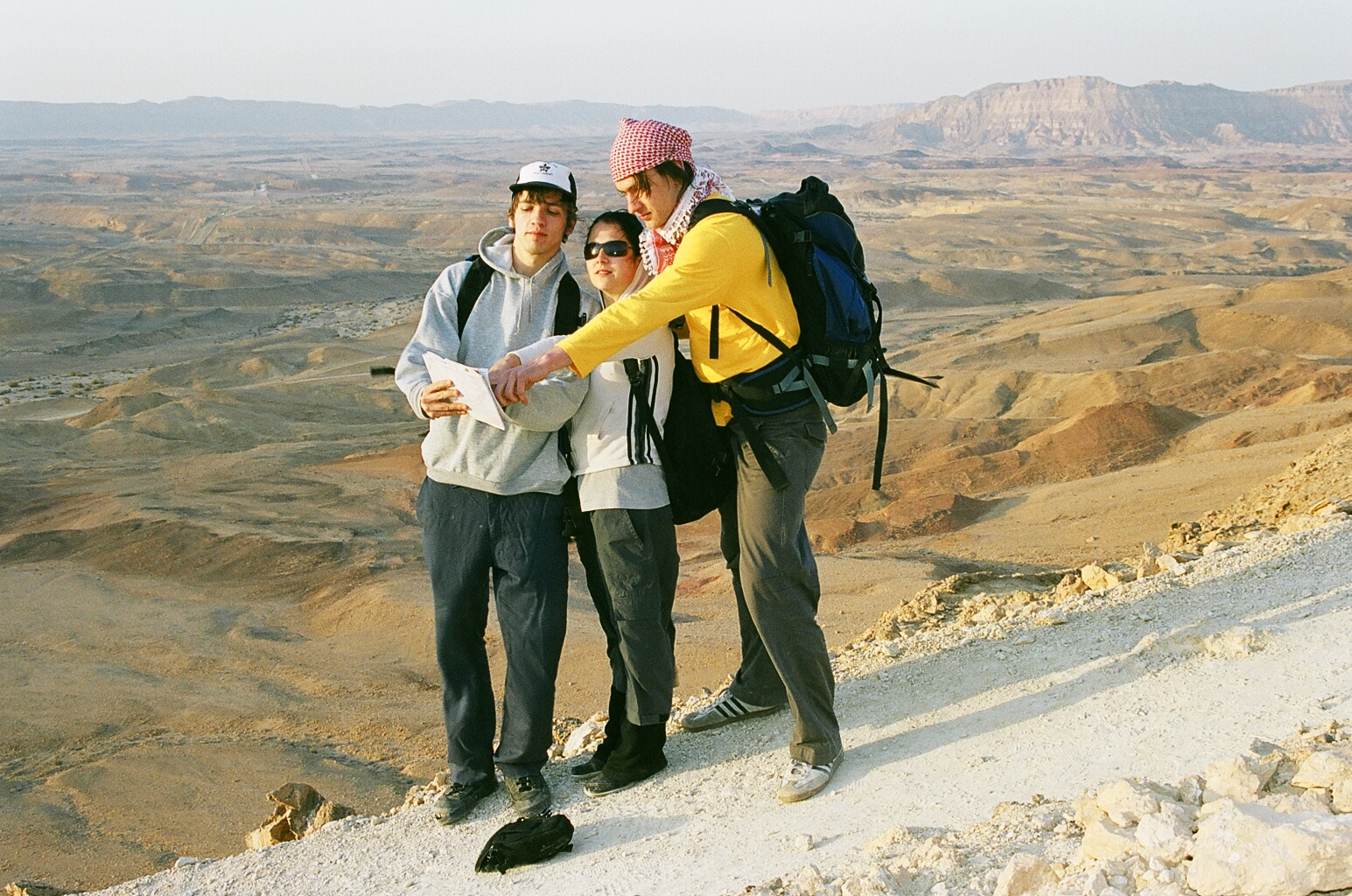

Orientation is a function of the mind involving awareness of three dimensions: time, place, and person. Problems with orientation lead to disorientation, and can be due to various conditions. It ranges from an inability to coherently understand person, place, time, and situation, to complete disorientation.

== Assessment ==
Assessment of a person's mental orientation is frequently designed to evaluate the need for focused diagnosis and treatment of conditions leading to an altered level of consciousness. A variety of basic prompts and tests are available to determine a person's level of orientation. These tests frequently primarily assess the ability of the person (within EMS) to perform basic functions of life (see: Airway Breathing Circulation), many assessments then gauge their level of amnesia, awareness of surroundings, concept of time, place, and response to verbal, and sensory stimuli.

== Causes of mental disorientation ==
Disorientation has a variety of causes, physiological and mental in nature. Physiological disorientation is frequently caused by an underlying or acute condition. Disease or injury that impairs the delivery of essential nutrients such as glucose, oxygen, fluids, or electrolytes can impair homeostasis, and therefore neurological function causing mental disorientation. Other causes are psycho-neurological in nature (see also Cognitive disorder) stemming from chemical imbalances in the brain, deterioration of the structure of the brain, or psychiatric states or illnesses that result in disorientation.

Mental orientation is frequently affected by shock, including physiological shock (see: Shock circulatory) and mental shock (see: Acute stress reaction, a psychological condition in response to acute stressful stimuli.)

Areas within precuneus, posterior cingulate cortex, inferior parietal lobe, medial prefrontal cortex, lateral frontal, lateral temporal cortices are believed to be responsible for situational orientation.

== See also ==
- Mental confusion
- Mental status examination
- Delirium
