= National Institutes of Health Stroke Scale =

Medical scoring system

The National Institutes of Health Stroke Scale, or NIH Stroke Scale (NIHSS), is a tool used by healthcare providers to objectively quantify the impairment caused by a stroke and aid planning post-acute care disposition, though was intended to assess differences in interventions in clinical trials. The NIHSS was designed for the National Institute of Neurological Disorders and Stroke (NINDS) Recombinant Tissue Plasminogen Activator (rt-PA) for Acute Stroke Trial and was first published by neurologist Dr. Patrick Lyden and colleagues in 2001. Prior to the NIHSS, during the late 1980s, several stroke-deficit rating scales were in use (e.g., University of Cincinnati scale, Canadian neurological scale, the Edinburgh-2 coma scale, and the Oxbury initial severity scale).

The NIHSS is composed of 11 items, each of which scores a specific ability between a 0 and 4. For each item, a score of 0 typically indicates normal function in that specific ability, while a higher score is indicative of some level of impairment.

The individual scores from each item are summed in order to calculate a patient's total NIHSS score. The maximum possible score is 42, with the minimum score being a 0.

Score	Stroke severity
0	No stroke symptoms
1–4	Minor stroke
5–15	Moderate stroke
16–20	Moderate to severe stroke
21–42	Severe stroke

== Performing the scale ==
While administering the NIHSS, it is important that the examiner does not coach or help with the assigned task. The examiner may demonstrate the commands to patients that are unable to comprehend verbal instructions; however, the score should reflect the patient's own ability. It is acceptable for the examiner to physically help the patient get into position to begin the test, but the examiner must not provide further assistance while the patient is attempting to complete the task.

For each item, the examiner should score the patient's first effort, and repeated attempts should not affect the patient's score. An exception to this rule exist in the language assessment (Item 9), in which the patient's best effort should be scored.

Some of the items contain "Default Coma Scores". These scores are automatically assigned to patients that scored a 3 in Item 1a. Note that the NIHSS may fluctuate depending on the time.

=== 1. Level of consciousness (LOC) ===
Level of consciousness (LOC) testing is divided into three sections. The first LOC items test for the patient's responsiveness. The second LOC item is based on the patient's ability to answer questions that are verbally presented by the examiner. The final LOC sub-section is based on the patient's ability to follow verbal commands to perform simple task.

Although this item is broken into three parts, each sub-section is added to the final score as if it is its own item.

==== A) LOC responsiveness ====
Scores for this item are assigned by a medical practitioner based on the stimuli required to arouse patient. The examiner should first assess if the patient is fully alert to their surroundings. If the patient is not completely alert, the examiner should attempt a verbal stimulus to arouse the patient. Failure of verbal stimuli indicates an attempt to arouse the patient via repeated physical stimuli. If none of these stimuli are successful in eliciting a response, the patient can be considered totally unresponsive.

Score	Test results
0	Alert; Responsive
1	Not alert; Verbally arousable or aroused by minor stimulation to obey, answer, or respond.
2	Not alert; Only responsive to repeated or strong and painful stimuli
3	Totally unresponsive; Responds only with reflexes or is areflexic

Notes

- If patients scores a 3 in this factor, the default coma scores should be used when applicable

==== B) LOC questions ====
Patient is verbally asked their age and for the name of the current month.

Score	Test results
0	Correctly answers both questions
1	Correctly answers one question
2	Does not correctly answer either question

Notes

- Default Coma Score: 2
- The patient must answer each question 100% correct without help to get credit
- Patients unable to speak are allowed to write the answer
- Aphasic patients or patients in a stuporous state who are unable to understand the commands receive a score of 2
- Patients that are unable to talk due to trauma, dysarthria, language barrier, or intubation are given a score of 1

==== C) LOC commands ====
The patient is instructed to first open and close their eyes and then grip and release their hand.

Score	Test results
0	Correctly performs both tasks
1	Correctly performs 1 task
2	Does not correctly perform either task

Notes

- Commands can only be repeated once.
- The hand grip command can be replaced with any other simple one step command if the patient cannot use their hands.
- A patient's attempt is regarded as successful if an attempt is made but is incomplete due to weakness.
- If the patient does not understand the command, the command can be visually demonstrated to them without an impact on their score.
- Patients with trauma, amputations, or other physical impediments can be given other simple one-step commands if these commands are not appropriate.

=== 2. Horizontal eye movement ===
Assesses ability for patient to track a pen or finger from side to side only using their eyes. This is designed to assess motor ability to gaze towards the hemisphere opposite of injury. This item is tested because conjugated eye deviation (CED) is present in approximately 20% of stroke cases. CED is more common in right hemispheric strokes and typically in lesions affecting the basal ganglia and temporoparietal cortex. Damage to these areas can result in decreased spatial attention and reduced control of eye movements.

Score	Test results
0	Normal; Able to follow pen or finger to both sides
1	Partial gaze palsy; gaze is abnormal in one or both eyes, but gaze is not totally paralyzed. Patient can gaze towards hemisphere of infarct, but cannot go past midline
2	Total gaze paresis; gaze is fixed to one side

Notes

- If patient is unable to follow the command to track an object, the investigator can make eye contact with the patient and then move side to side. The patient's gaze palsy can then be assessed by their ability to maintain eye contact.
- If patient is unable to follow any commands, assess the horizontal eye movement via the oculocephalic maneuver. This is done by manually turning the patient's head from midline to one side and assessing the eye's reflex to return to a midline position.
- If the patient has isolated peripheral nerve paresis assign a score of 1.

=== 3. Visual field test ===
Assess the patient's vision in each visual fields. Each eye is tested individually, by covering one eye and then the other. Each upper and lower quadrant is tested by asking the patient to indicate how many fingers the investigator is presenting in each quadrant. The investigator should instruct the patient to maintain eye contact throughout this test, and not allow the patient to realign focus towards each stimulus. With the first eye covered, place a random number of fingers in each quadrant and ask the patient how many fingers are being presented. Repeat this testing for the opposite eye.

Score	Test results
0	No vision loss
1	Partial hemianopia or complete quadrantanopia; patient recognizes no visual stimulus in one specific quadrant
2	Complete hemianopia; patient recognizes no visual stimulus in one half of the visual field
3	Bilateral blindness, including blindness from any cause

Notes

- If patient is non-verbal, they can be allowed to respond by holding up the number of fingers the investigator is presenting.
- If patient is not responsive the visual fields can be tested by visual threat (the investigator moving an object towards the eye and observing the patient's response, being careful not to trigger the corneal reflex with air movement).

=== 4. Facial palsy ===
Facial palsy is partial or complete paralysis of portions of the face. Typically this paralysis is most pronounced in the lower half of one facial side. However, depending on lesion location the paralysis may be present in other facial regions. While inspecting the symmetry of each facial expression the examiner should first instruct patient to show their teeth (or gums). Second, the patient should be asked to squeeze their eyes closed as hard as possible. After reopening their eyes, the patient is then instructed to raise their eyebrows.

Score	Test results
0	Normal and symmetrical movement
1	Minor paralysis; function is less than clearly normal, such as flattened nasolabial fold or minor asymmetry in smile
2	Partial paralysis; particularly paralysis in lower face
3	Complete facial Hemiparesis, total paralysis in upper and lower portions of one face side

Notes

- If the patient is unable to understand verbal commands, the instructions should be demonstrated to the patient.
- Patients incapable of comprehending any commands may be tested by applying a noxious stimulus and observing for any paralysis in the resulting grimace.

=== 5. Motor arm ===
With palm facing downwards, have the patient extend one arm 90 degrees out in front if the patient is sitting, and 45 degrees out in front if the patient is lying down. If necessary, help the patient get into the correct position. As soon as the patient's arm is in position the investigator should begin verbally counting down from 10 while simultaneously counting down on their fingers in full view of the patient. Observe to detect any downward arm drift prior to the end of the 10 seconds. Downward movement that occurs directly after the investigator places the patient's arm in position should not be considered downward drift. Repeat this test for the opposite arm. This item should be scored for the right and left arm individually, denoted as item 5a and 5b.

Score	Test results
0	No arm drift; the arm remains in the initial position for the full 10 seconds
1	Drift; the arm drifts to an intermediate position prior to the end of the full 10 seconds, but not at any point relies on a support
2	Limited effort against gravity; the arm is able to obtain the starting position, but drifts down from the initial position to a physical support prior to the end of the 10 seconds
3	No effort against gravity; the arm falls immediately after being helped to the initial position, however the patient is able to move the arm in some form (e.g. shoulder shrug)
4	No movement; patient has no ability to enact voluntary movement in this arm

Notes

- Default coma score: 8
- Test the non paralyzed arm first if applicable
- Score should be recorded for each arm separately, resulting in a maximum potential score of 8.
- Motor Arm assessment should be skipped in the case of an amputee, however a note should be made in the scoring of the amputation.
- If patient is unable to understand commands, the investigator should deliver the instructions via demonstration

=== 6. Motor leg ===
With the patient in the supine position, one leg is placed 30 degrees above horizontal. As soon as the patient's leg is in position the investigator should begin verbally counting down from 5 while simultaneously counting down on their fingers in full view of the patient. Observe any downward leg drift prior to the end of the 5 seconds. Downward movement that occurs directly after the investigator places the patient's leg in position should not be considered downward drift. Repeat this test for the opposite leg. Scores for this section should be recorded separately as 6a and 6b for the left and right legs respectively.

Score	Test results
0	No leg drift; the leg remains in the initial position for the full 5 seconds
1	Drift; the leg drifts to an intermediate position prior to the end of the full 5 seconds, but at no point touches the bed for support
2	Limited effort against gravity; the leg is able to obtain the starting position, but drifts down from the initial position to physical support prior to the end of the 5 seconds
3	No effort against gravity; the leg falls immediately after being helped to the initial position, however, the patient is able to move the leg in some form (e.g. hip flex)
4	No movement; patient has no ability to enact voluntary movement in this leg

Notes

- Default coma score: 8
- This is performed for each leg, indicating a maximum possible score of 8
- Test the non paralyzed leg first if applicable
- Motor leg assessment should be skipped in the case of an amputee, however a note should be made in the score records
- If patient is unable to understand commands, the investigator should deliver the instructions via demonstration

=== 7. Limb ataxia ===
This test for the presence of a unilateral cerebellar lesion, and distinguishes a difference between general weakness and incoordination. The patient should be instructed to first touch their finger to the examiner's finger then move that finger back to their nose, repeat this movement 3-4 times for each hand. Next the patient should be instructed to move their heel up and down the shin of their opposite leg. This test should be repeated for the other leg as well.

Score	Test results
0	Normal coordination; smooth and accurate movement
1	Ataxia present in 1 limb; rigid and inaccurate movement in one limb
2	Ataxia present in 2 or more limbs: rigid and inaccurate movement in both limbs on one side

Notes

- If significant weakness is present, score 0
- If patient is unable to understand commands or move limbs, score is 0
- Patient's eyes should remain open throughout this section
- If applicable, test the un-paretic side first

=== 8. Sensory ===
Sensory testing is performed via pinpricks in the proximal portion of all four limbs. While applying pinpricks, the investigator should ask whether or not the patient feels the pricks, and if they feel the pricks differently on one side when compared to the other side.

Score	Test results
0	No evidence of sensory loss
1	Mild-to-Moderate sensory loss; patient feels the pinprick, however they feel as if it is duller on one side
2	Severe to total sensory loss on one side; patient is not aware they are being touched in all unilateral extremities

Notes

- Default coma score: 2
- The investigator should insure that the sensory loss being detected is a result of the stroke, and should therefore test multiple spots on the body.
- For patients unable to understand the instructions, the pinprick can be replaced by a noxious stimulus and the grimace can be judged to determine sensory score.

=== 9. Language ===
This item measures the patient's language skills. After completing items 1-8, it is likely the investigator has gained an approximation of the patient's language skills; however, it is important to confirm this measurement at this time. The stroke scale includes a picture of a scenario, a list of simple sentences, a figure of assorted random objects, and a list of words. The patient should be asked to explain the scenario depicted in the first figure.

Next, the patient should read the list of sentences and name each of the objects depicted in the next figure. The scoring for this item should be based on both the results from the test performed in this item in addition to the language skills demonstrated up to this point in the stroke scale.

Score	Test results
0	Normal; no obvious speech deficit
1	Mild-to-moderate aphasia; detectable loss in fluency, however, the examiner should still be able to extract information from patient's speech
2	Severe aphasia; all speech is fragmented, and examiner is unable to extract the figure's content from the patients speech.
3	Unable to speak or understand speech

Notes

- Default coma score: 3
- Patients with visual loss should be asked to identify objects placed in their hands.
- This is an exception to recording only the patients first attempt. In this item, the patients best language skills should be recorded.

=== 10. Speech ===
Dysarthria is the lack of motor skills required to produce understandable speech. Dysarthria is strictly a motor problem, and is not related to the patient's ability to comprehend speech. Strokes that cause dysarthria typically affect areas such as the anterior opercular, medial prefrontal and premotor, and anterior cingulate regions. These brain regions are vital in coordinating motor control of the tongue, throat, lips, and lungs. To perform this item the patient is asked to read from the list of words provided with the stroke scale while the examiner observes the patient's articulation and clarity of speech.

Score	Test results
0	Normal; clear and smooth speech
1	Mild-to-moderate dysarthria; some slurring of speech, however the patient can be understood
2	Severe dysarthria; speech is so slurred that they cannot be understood, or patients that cannot produce any speech

Notes

- Default coma score:2
- An intubated patient should not be rated on this item, instead make note of the situation in the scoring documents.

=== 11. Extinction and inattention (f.k.a. neglect) ===
Sufficient information regarding this item may have been obtained by the examiner in items 1–10 to properly score the patient. However, if any ambiguity exist the examiner should test this item via a technique referred to as "double simultaneous stimulation".

Double simultaneous stimulation is performed by having the patient close their eyes and asking them to identify the side on which they are being touched by the examiner. During this time, the examiner is alternating between touching the patient on the right and left side. Next, the examiner touches the patient on both sides at the same time. This should be repeated on the patients face, arms, and legs.

To test extinction in vision, the examiner should hold up one finger in front of each of the patient's eyes and ask the patient to determine which finger is wiggling or if both are wiggling. The examiner should then alternate between wiggling each finger and wiggling both fingers at the same time.

Score	Test results
0	Normal; patient correctly answers all questions
1	Inattention on one side in one modality; visual, tactile, auditory, or spatial
2	Hemi-inattention; does not recognize stimuli in more than one modality on the same side.

Notes

- Default coma score: 2
- Patient with severe vision loss that correctly identifies all other stimulations scores a 0

== Usage ==
The NIHSS was designed to be a standardized and repeatable assessment of stroke patients utilized by large multi-center clinical trials. Clinical researchers have widely accepted this scale due to its high scoring consistency, which has been demonstrated in inter-examiner and in test-retest scenarios. Clinical research use of the NIHSS typically involves obtaining a baseline NIHSS score as soon as possible after onset of stroke symptoms The NIHSS is then repeated at regular intervals or after significant changes in patient condition. This history of scores can then be utilized to monitor the effectiveness of treatment methods and quantify a patient's improvement or decline. The NIHSS has also been used in a prospective observational study, to predict 3 month outcomes of patients with undernutrition during hospital stays directly after a stroke.

=== NIHSS use in tPA eligibility ===
NIHSS has gained popularity as a clinical tool utilized in treatment planning. Tissue plasminogen activator (tPA), a type of thrombolysis, is one of the main options for treatment of acute ischemic strokes (the type of stroke caused by blood clots that are preventing blood flow within a cerebral artery).

The effectiveness and risk of tPA is strongly correlated with the delay between stroke onset and tPA delivery ("door-to-needle time"). Current standards recommend for tPA to be delivered within 4,5 hours of onset, while best results occur when treatment is delivered within 90 minutes of onset.

Since the NIHSS has been established as a quick and consistent quantifier of stroke severity, many physicians have looked to NIHSS scores as indicators for tPA treatment. This rapid assessment of stroke severity is targeted to reduce delay of tPA treatment. While some clinical trials have used minimum and maximum NIHSS scores to determine eligibility for acute treatment such as tPA, guidelines such as those from the American Heart Association / American Stroke Association urge against NIHSS scores being used as the sole reason for declaring a patient as ineligible for tPA treatment.

=== NIHSS structure ===
In an effort to produce a complete neurological assessment the NIHSS was developed after extensive research and multiple iterations. The goal of the NIHSS was to accurately measure holistic neurological function by individually testing specific abilities. NIHSS total score is based on the summation of 4 factors. These factors are left and right motor function and left and right cortical function. The NIHSS assesses each of these specific functions by the stroke scale item listed in the chart below.

Left cortical	Right cortical	Right motor	Left motor
LOC questions	Horizontal eye movement	Right arm motor	Left arm motor
LOC commands	Visual fields	Right leg	Left leg
Language	Extinction and inattention	Dysarthria	
	Sensory		

=== Modified National Institutes of Health Stroke Scale (mNIHSS) ===
The Modified NIH Stroke Scale (mNIHSS) is a shortened, validated version of the mNIHSS. It has been shown to be equally, if not more, accurate than the longer, older NIHSS. It removes questions 1A, 4, and 7. This makes the mNIHSS shorter and easier to use.

The mNIHSS predicts patients at high risk of hemorrhage if given tissue plasminogen activator (tPA) and which patients are likely to have good clinical outcomes. The mNIHSS has also recently been shown to be taken without seeing the patient, and only using medical records. This potentially improves care while in the emergency room and the hospital, but also facilitates retrospective research.

== Accuracy ==
The National Institutes of Health Stroke Scale has been repeatedly validated as a tool for assessing stroke severity and as an excellent predictor for patient outcomes. Severity of a stroke is heavily correlated with the volume of brain affected by the stroke; strokes affecting larger portions of the brain tend to have more detrimental effects. NIHSS scores have been found to be reliable predictors of damaged brain volume, with a smaller NIHSS score indicating a smaller lesion volume.

=== Effect of stroke location on NIHSS prediction of stroke severity ===
The NIHSS places 7 of the possible 42 points on abilities that require verbal skills; 2 points from the LOC questions, 2 points from LOC commands, and 3 points from the Language item. The NIHSS only awards 2 points for extinction and inattention. Approximately 98% of humans have verbal processing take place in the left hemisphere, indicating that the NIHSS places more value on deficits in the left hemisphere. This results in lesions receiving a higher (worse) score when occurring in the left hemisphere, compared to lesions of equal size in the right hemisphere. Due to this emphasis, the NIHSS is a better predictor of lesion volume in the strokes occurring within the left cerebral hemisphere.

=== NIHSS as predictor of patient outcomes ===
The NIHSS has been found to be an excellent predictor of patient outcomes. A baseline NIHSS score greater than 16 indicates a strong probability of patient death, while a baseline NIHSS score less than 6 indicates a strong probability of a good recovery. On average, an increase of 1 point in a patient's NIHSS score decreases the likelihood of an excellent outcome by 17%. However, correlation between functional recovery and NIHSS scores was weaker when the stroke was isolated to the cortex.

== Other stroke-related scores ==
- ABCD² score
- CHADS2 score
