= Cognitive impairment =

Medical condition

- Other names: Cognitive deficit
- Specialty: Psychiatry

Cognitive impairment is an inclusive term to describe any characteristic that acts as a barrier to cognition or different areas of cognition. Cognition, also known as cognitive function, refers to the mental processes of how a person gains knowledge, uses existing knowledge, and understands things that are happening around them using their thoughts and senses.

Cognitive impairment can be in different domains or aspects of a person's cognitive function including memory, attention span, planning, reasoning, decision-making, language (comprehension, writing, speech), executive functioning, and visuospatial functioning. The term cognitive impairment covers many different diseases and conditions and may also be a symptom or manifestation of a different underlying condition. Examples include impairments in overall intelligence (as with intellectual disabilities), specific and restricted impairments in cognitive abilities (such as in learning disorders like dyslexia), neuropsychological impairments (such as in attention, working memory or executive function), or it may describe drug-induced impairment in cognition and memory (such as that seen with alcohol, glucocorticoids, and the benzodiazepines.). Cognitive impairments may be short-term, progressive (gets worse over time), or permanent.

There are different approaches to assessing or diagnosing a cognitive impairment including neuropsychological testing using various different tests that consider the different domains of cognition. Examples of shorter assessment clinical tools include the Mini Mental State Examination (MMSE) and the Montreal Cognitive Assessment (MoCA). There are many different syndromes and pathologies that cause cognitive impairment including dementia, mild neurocognitive disorder, and Alzheimer's disease.

== Cause ==
Cognitive impairments may be caused by many different factors including environmental factors or injuries to the brain (e.g., traumatic brain injury), neurological illnesses, or mental disorders. While more common in elderly people, not all people who are elderly have cognitive impairments. Some known causes of cognitive impairments that are more common in younger people are: chromosomal abnormalities or genetic syndromes, exposure to teratogens while in utero (e.g., prenatal exposure to drugs), undernourishment, poisonings, autism, sleep loss and child abuse. Stroke, dementia, depression, schizophrenia, substance abuse, brain tumours, malnutrition, brain injuries, hormonal disorders, and other chronic disorders may result in cognitive impairment with aging. Cognitive impairment may also be caused by a pathology in the brain. Examples include Alzheimer's disease, Parkinson's disease, HIV/AIDS-induced dementia, dementia with Lewy bodies, and Huntington's disease.

Short-term cognitive impairment can be caused by pharmaceutical drugs such as sedatives.

== Screening ==
Screening for cognitive impairment in those over the age of 65 without symptoms is of unclear benefit versus harm as of 2020. In a large population-based cohort study included 579,710 66-year-old adults who were followed for a total of 3,870,293 person-years (average 6.68 ± 1.33 years per person), subjective cognitive decline was significantly associated with an increased risk of subsequent dementia.

In addition to a series of cognitive tests, general practitioner physicians often also rely on clinical judgement for diagnosing cognitive impairment. Clinical judgement is ideal when paired with additional tests that permit the medical professional to confirm the diagnosis or confirm the absence of a diagnosis. Clinical judgement in these cases may also help inform the choice in additional tests.

== Treatment ==
Deciding on an appropriate treatment for people with cognitive decline takes clinical judgement based on the diagnosis (the specific cognitive problem), the person's symptoms, other patient factors including expectations and the person's own ideas, and previous approaches to helping the person.

== Prognosis ==
When a person's level of cognition declines, it is often harder to live in an independent setting. Some people may have trouble taking care of themselves and the burden on the people caring for them can increase. Some people require supportive healthcare and, in some cases, institutionalization.

== Research ==
The role of light therapy for treating people with cognitive impairment or dementia is not fully understood.

Although one would expect cognitive decline to have major effects on job performance, it seems that there is little to no correlation of health with job performance. With the exception of cognitive-dependent jobs such as air-traffic controller, professional athlete, or other elite jobs, age does not seem to impact one's job performance. This obviously conflicts with cognitive tests given, so the matter has been researched further. One possible reason for this conclusion is the rare need for a person to perform at their maximum. There is a difference between typical functioning, that is – the normal level of functioning for daily life, and maximal functioning, that is – what cognitive tests observe as our maximum level of functioning. As the maximum cognitive ability that we are able to achieve decreases, it may not actually affect our daily lives, which only require the normal level.

Some studies have indicated that childhood hunger might have a protective effect on cognitive decline. One possible explanation is that the onset of age-related changes in the body can be delayed by calorie restriction. Another possible explanation is the selective survival effect, as the study participants who had a childhood with hunger tend to be the healthiest of their era.

== See also ==
- Dementia with Lewy bodies
- Fluid and crystallized intelligence
- Neurocognitive disorder
- PASS Theory of Intelligence
