= Montreal Cognitive Assessment =

Screening assessment for detecting cognitive impairment

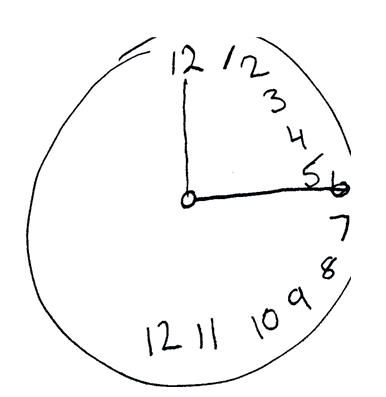
- In the Montreal test, the participant is requested to draw a clock. This participant displays signs of allochiria.
- Synonyms: Montreal test
- Purpose: Evaluation of cognitive deficit and Alzheimer's disease
- Test of: Cognitive skill

The Montreal Cognitive Assessment (MoCA) is a widely used screening assessment for detecting cognitive impairment. It was created in 1996 by Ziad Nasreddine in Montreal, Quebec. It was validated in the setting of mild cognitive impairment (MCI) and has subsequently been adopted in numerous other clinical settings. This test consists of 30 points and takes 10 minutes for the individual to complete. The original English version is performed in seven steps, which may change in some countries dependent on education and culture. The basics of this test include short-term memory, executive function, attention, focus, and more.

== Format ==
The MoCA is a one-page 30-point test administered in approximately 10 minutes. The test and administration instructions are available for clinicians online. The test is available in 46 languages and dialects (as of 2017).

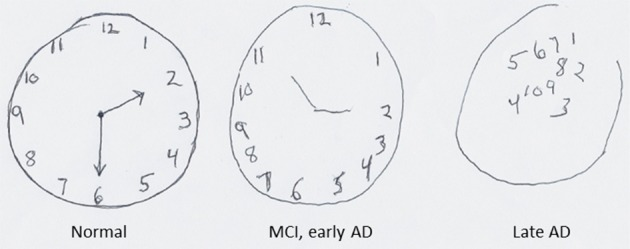
In this clock drawing task, the subject is asked to draw a clock with the hours and showing the time 2:30. Successive results show a deterioration of pattern processing ability in a subject as they progress from mild cognitive impairment (MCI) to severe Alzheimer's disease (AD).

The MoCA assesses several cognitive domains:

- The short-term memory recall task (5 points) involves two learning trials of five nouns and delayed recall after approximately five minutes.
- Visuospatial abilities are assessed using a clock drawing task (3 points) and a three-dimensional cube copy (1 point).
- Multiple aspects of executive function are assessed using an alternation task adapted from the trail-making B task (1 point), a phonemic fluency task (1 point), and a two-item verbal abstraction task (2 points).
- Attention, concentration, and working memory are evaluated using a sustained attention task (target detection using tapping; 1 point), serial sevens (serial subtraction task; 3 points), and digit span forward and backward (1 point each).
- Language is assessed using a three-item confrontation naming task with low-familiarity animals (lion, camel, rhinoceros; 3 points), repetition of two syntactically complex sentences (2 points), and the aforementioned fluency task.
- Abstract reasoning is assessed using a describe-the-similarity task with 2 points being available.
- Finally, orientation to time and place is evaluated by asking the subject for the date and the city in which the test is occurring (6 points).

Because MoCA is English-specific, linguistic and cultural translations are made in order to adapt the test in other countries. Multiple cultural and linguistic variables may affect the norms of the MoCA across different countries and languages, e.g. Swedish. Several cut-off scores have been suggested across different languages to compensate for the education level of the population, and several modifications were also necessary to accommodate certain linguistic and cultural differences across different languages or countries; however, not all versions have been validated.

== Efficacy ==
=== MoCA test study ===
A MoCA test validation study by Nasreddine in 2005 showed that the MoCA was a promising tool for detecting MCI and early Alzheimer's disease compared with the well-known Mini-Mental State Examination (MMSE).

According to the validation study, the sensitivity and specificity of the MoCA for detecting MCI were 90% and 87% respectively, compared with 18% and 100% respectively for the MMSE. Subsequent studies in other settings were less promising, though generally superior to the MMSE.

Other studies have tested the MoCA on patients with Alzheimer's disease.

People with hearing loss, which commonly occurs alongside dementia, score worse in the MoCA test, which could lead to a false diagnosis of dementia. Researchers have developed an adapted version of the MoCA test, which is accurate and reliable and avoids the need for people to listen and respond to questions.

=== Recommendations ===
The National Institutes of Health and the Canadian Stroke Network recommended selected subsets of the MoCA for the detection of vascular cognitive impairment.

== Scoring ==
MoCA scores range between 0 and 30. A score of 26 or over is considered to be normal. In a study, people without cognitive impairment scored an average of 27.4; people with MCI scored an average of 22.1; people with Alzheimer's disease scored an average of 16.2.

In a study by Ihle-Hansen et al. (2017), of 3,413 Norwegian participants aged 63–65, of whom 47% had higher education (over 12 years), under 5% of subjects scored 30/30 with a mean MoCA score of 25.3 and 49% scoring below the suggested cut-off of 26 points, leading the authors to suggest that "the cut-off score may have been set too high to distinguish normal cognitive function from MCI".

== Normalization studies ==
In addition to a growing amount of international normative data, the Memory Index Score (MIS), which is included in the most recent test versions, is gaining increasing diagnostic importance. In a Dutch regression-based normative data study, normative values have been published for both the total value of the MoCA and for the included Memory Index Score for a total of seven age cohorts between 18 and 91 years.

== Other applications ==
Since the MoCA assesses multiple cognitive domains, it can be a useful cognitive screening tool for several neurological diseases that affect younger populations, such as Parkinson's disease, vascular cognitive impairment, Huntington's disease, brain metastasis, sleep behaviour disorder, primary brain tumors (including high- and low-grade gliomas), multiple sclerosis and other conditions such as traumatic brain injury, cognitive impairment from schizophrenia and heart failure. The test is also used in hospitals to determine whether patients should be allowed to live alone or with a home aide.

== In American politics ==
U.S. President Donald Trump has undergone the MoCA at least twice:

- In January 2018, during his first term of his presidency, by White House Physician Ronny Jackson.
- In April 2025, during his second term of his presidency, by White House Physician Sean Barbabella.

According to Jackson and Barbabella, Trump scored a 30 out of 30 score on both assessments. Trump's repeated use of the phrase "Person, woman, man, camera, TV" while describing the test became an Internet meme and went viral on social media platforms. Trump has been criticized for distorting or misrepresenting the nature of the test, suggesting that it is an IQ test rather than a screen for severe cognitive impairment.

In 2023, presidential candidate Nikki Haley campaigned for the 2024 Republican nomination, partially on a platform plank that would have required all politicians aged 75 or older take the MoCA. This proposal would have required both President Biden and President Trump, but not Haley, take the MoCA.

U.S. President Joe Biden declined to take the MoCA during his presidency, stating that he has "a cognitive test every single day" in performing his presidential duties. This decision earned Biden some criticism, amid concerns about his age and health, including from Jeffrey Kuhlman, who served as White House Physician under President Barack Obama.

== See also ==
- Mini–mental state examination
