= Mental status examination =

Way of observing and describing a patient's current state of mind

- ICD-9-CM: 94.09, 94.11

The mental status examination (MSE) is an important part of the clinical assessment process in neurological and psychiatric practice. It is a structured way of observing and describing a patient's psychological functioning at a given point in time, under the domains of appearance, attitude, behavior, mood and affect, speech, thought process, thought content, perception, cognition, insight, and judgment. There are some minor variations in the subdivision of the MSE and the sequence and names of MSE domains.

The purpose of the MSE is to obtain a comprehensive cross-sectional description of the patient's mental state, which, when combined with the biographical and historical information of the psychiatric history, allows the clinician to make an accurate diagnosis and formulation, which are required for coherent treatment planning.

The data are collected through a combination of direct and indirect means: unstructured observation while obtaining the biographical and social information, focused questions about current symptoms, and formalised psychological tests.

The MSE is not to be confused with the mini–mental state examination (MMSE), which is a brief neuropsychological screening test for dementia.

== Theoretical foundations ==
The MSE derives from an approach to psychiatry known as descriptive psychopathology or descriptive phenomenology, which developed from the work of the philosopher and psychiatrist Karl Jaspers. From Jaspers' perspective it was assumed that the only way to comprehend a patient's experience is through his or her own description (through an approach of empathic and non-theoretical enquiry), as distinct from an interpretive or psychoanalytic approach which assumes the analyst might understand experiences or processes of which the patient is unaware, such as defense mechanisms or unconscious drives.

In practice, the MSE is a blend of empathic descriptive phenomenology and empirical clinical observation. It has been argued that the term phenomenology has become corrupted in clinical psychiatry: current usage, as a set of supposedly objective descriptions of a psychiatric patient (a synonym for signs and symptoms), is incompatible with the original meaning which was concerned with comprehending a patient's subjective experience.

== Application ==
The mental status examination is a core skill of qualified (mental) health personnel. It is a key part of the initial psychiatric assessment in an outpatient or psychiatric hospital setting. It is a systematic collection of data based on observation of the patient's behavior while the patient is in the clinician's view during the interview. The purpose is to obtain evidence of symptoms and signs of mental disorders, including danger to self and others, that are present at the time of the interview. Further, information on the patient's insight, judgment, and capacity for abstract reasoning is used to inform decisions about treatment strategy and the choice of an appropriate treatment setting. It is carried out in the manner of an informal enquiry, using a combination of open and closed questions, supplemented by structured tests to assess cognition. The MSE can also be considered part of the comprehensive physical examination performed by physicians and nurses although it may be performed in a cursory and abbreviated way in non-mental-health settings. Information is usually recorded as free-form text using the standard headings, but brief MSE checklists are available for use in emergency situations, for example, by paramedics or emergency department staff. The information obtained in the MSE is used, together with the biographical and social information of the psychiatric history, to generate a diagnosis, a psychiatric formulation and a treatment plan.

== Domains ==
The mnemonic ASEPTIC can be used to remember the domains of the MSE:

- A - Appearance/Behavior
- S - Speech
- E - Emotion (Mood and Affect)
- P - Perception
- T - Thought Content and Process
- I - Insight and Judgement
- C - Cognition

=== Appearance ===
Clinicians assess the physical aspects such as the appearance of a patient, including apparent age, height, weight, and manner of dress and grooming. Colorful or bizarre clothing might suggest mania, while unkempt, dirty clothes might suggest schizophrenia or depression. If the patient appears much older than his or her chronological age this can suggest chronic poor self-care or ill-health. Clothing and accessories of a particular subculture, body modifications, or clothing not typical of the patient's gender, might give clues to personality. Observations of physical appearance might include the physical features of alcoholism or drug abuse, such as signs of malnutrition, nicotine stains, dental erosion, a rash around the mouth from inhalant abuse, or needle track marks from intravenous drug abuse. Observations can also include any odor which might suggest poor personal hygiene due to extreme self-neglect, or alcohol intoxication. Weight loss could also signify a depressive disorder, physical illness, anorexia nervosa or chronic anxiety.

=== Attitude ===
Attitude, also known as rapport or cooperation, refers to the patient's approach to the interview process and the quality of information obtained during the assessment. Observations of attitude include whether the patient is cooperative, hostile, open or secretive.

=== Behavior ===
Abnormalities of behavior, also called abnormalities of activity, include observations of specific abnormal movements, as well as more general observations of the patient's level of activity and arousal, and observations of the patient's eye contact and gait. Abnormal movements, for example choreiform, athetoid or choreoathetoid movements may indicate a neurological disorder. A tremor or dystonia may indicate a neurological condition or the side effects of antipsychotic medication. The patient may have tics (involuntary but quasi-purposeful movements or vocalizations) which may be a symptom of Tourette's syndrome. There are a range of abnormalities of movement which are typical of catatonia, such as echopraxia, catalepsy, waxy flexibility and paratonia (or gegenhalten). Stereotypies (repetitive purposeless movements such as rocking or head banging) or mannerisms (repetitive quasi-purposeful abnormal movements such as a gesture or abnormal gait) may be a feature of chronic schizophrenia or autism.

More global behavioural abnormalities may be noted, such as an increase in arousal and movement (described as psychomotor agitation or hyperactivity) which might reflect mania or delirium. An inability to sit still might represent akathisia, a side effect of antipsychotic medication. Similarly, a global decrease in arousal and movement (described as psychomotor retardation, akinesia or stupor) might indicate depression or a medical condition such as Parkinson's disease, dementia or delirium. The examiner would also comment on eye movements (repeatedly glancing to one side can suggest that the patient is experiencing hallucinations), and the quality of eye contact (which can provide clues to the patient's emotional state). Lack of eye contact may suggest depression or autism.

=== Mood and affect ===
The distinction between mood and affect in the MSE is subject to some disagreement. For example, Trzepacz and Baker (1993) describe affect as "the external and dynamic manifestations of a person's internal emotional state" and mood as "a person's predominant internal state at any one time", whereas Sims (1995) refers to affect as "differentiated specific feelings" and mood as "a more prolonged state or disposition". This article will use the Trzepacz and Baker (1993) definitions, with mood regarded as a current subjective state as described by the patient, and affect as the examiner's inferences of the quality of the patient's emotional state based on objective observation.

Mood is described using the patient's own words, and can also be described in summary terms such as neutral, euthymic, dysphoric, euphoric, angry, anxious or apathetic. Alexithymic individuals may be unable to describe their subjective mood state. An individual who is unable to experience any pleasure may have anhedonia.

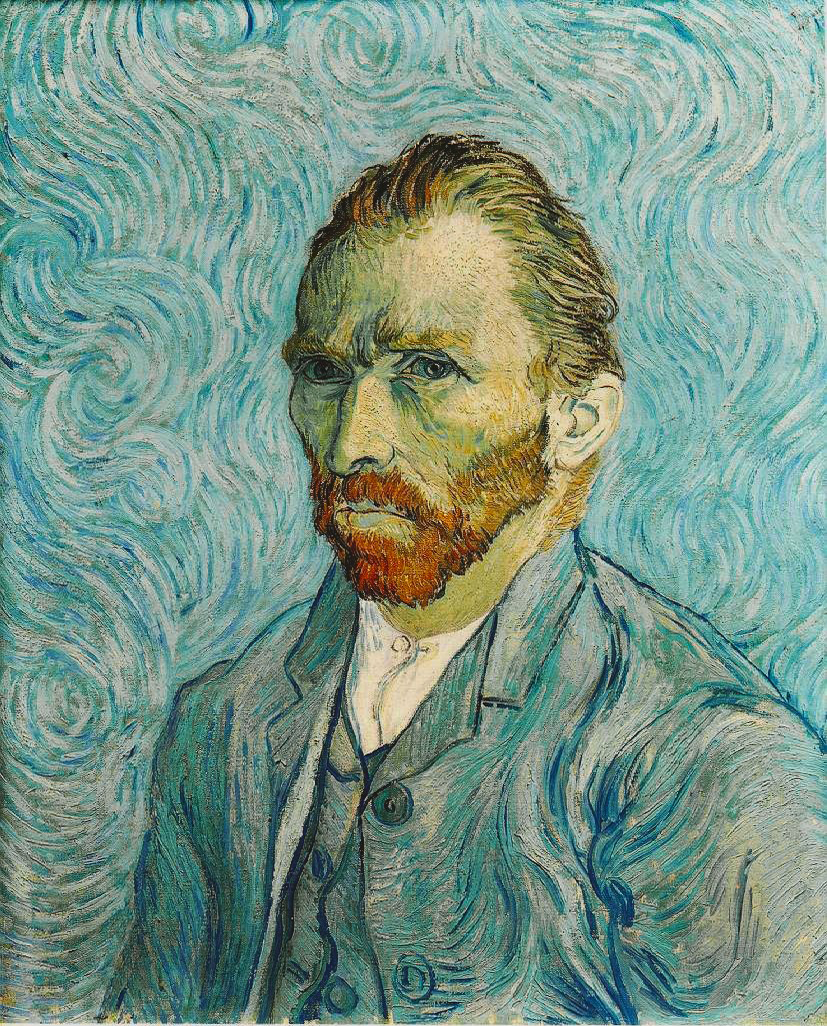
Vincent van Gogh's 1889 Self Portrait suggests the artist's mood and affect in the time leading up to his suicide.

Affect is described by labelling the apparent emotion conveyed by the person's nonverbal behavior (anxious, sad etc.), and also by using the parameters of appropriateness, intensity, range, reactivity and mobility. Affect may be described as appropriate or inappropriate to the current situation, and as congruent or incongruent with their thought content. For example, someone who shows a bland affect when describing a very distressing experience would be described as showing incongruent affect, which might suggest schizophrenia. The intensity of the affect may be described as normal, blunted affect, exaggerated, flat, heightened or overly dramatic. A flat or blunted affect is associated with schizophrenia, depression or post-traumatic stress disorder; heightened affect might suggest mania, and an overly dramatic or exaggerated affect might suggest certain personality disorders. Mobility refers to the extent to which affect changes during the interview: the affect may be described as fixed, mobile, immobile, constricted/restricted or labile. The person may show a full range of affect, in other words a wide range of emotional expression during the assessment, or may be described as having restricted affect. The affect may also be described as reactive, in other words changing flexibly and appropriately with the flow of conversation, or as unreactive. A bland lack of concern for one's disability may be described as showing la belle indifférence, a feature of conversion disorder, which is historically termed "hysteria" in older texts.

=== Speech ===
Speech is assessed by observing the patient's spontaneous speech, and also by using structured tests of specific language functions. This heading is concerned with the production of speech rather than the content of speech, which is addressed under thought process and thought content (see below). When observing the patient's spontaneous speech, the interviewer will note and comment on paralinguistic features such as the loudness, rhythm, prosody, intonation, pitch, phonation, articulation, quantity, rate, spontaneity and latency of speech. Many acoustic features have been shown to be significantly altered in mental health disorders. A structured assessment of speech includes an assessment of expressive language by asking the patient to name objects, repeat short sentences, or produce as many words as possible from a certain category in a set time. Simple language tests also form part of the mini-mental state examination. In practice, the structured assessment of receptive and expressive language is often reported under Cognition (see below).

Language assessment will allow the recognition of medical conditions presenting with aphonia or dysarthria, neurological conditions such as stroke or dementia presenting with aphasia, and specific language disorders such as stuttering, cluttering or mutism. People with autism spectrum disorders may have abnormalities in paralinguistic and pragmatic aspects of their speech. Echolalia (repetition of another person's words) and palilalia (repetition of the subject's own words) can be heard with patients with autism, schizophrenia or Alzheimer's disease. A person with schizophrenia might use neologisms, which are made-up words which have a specific meaning to the person using them. Speech assessment also contributes to assessment of mood, for example people with mania or anxiety may have rapid, loud and pressured speech; on the other hand depressed patients will typically have a prolonged speech latency and speak in a slow, quiet and hesitant manner.

=== Thought process ===
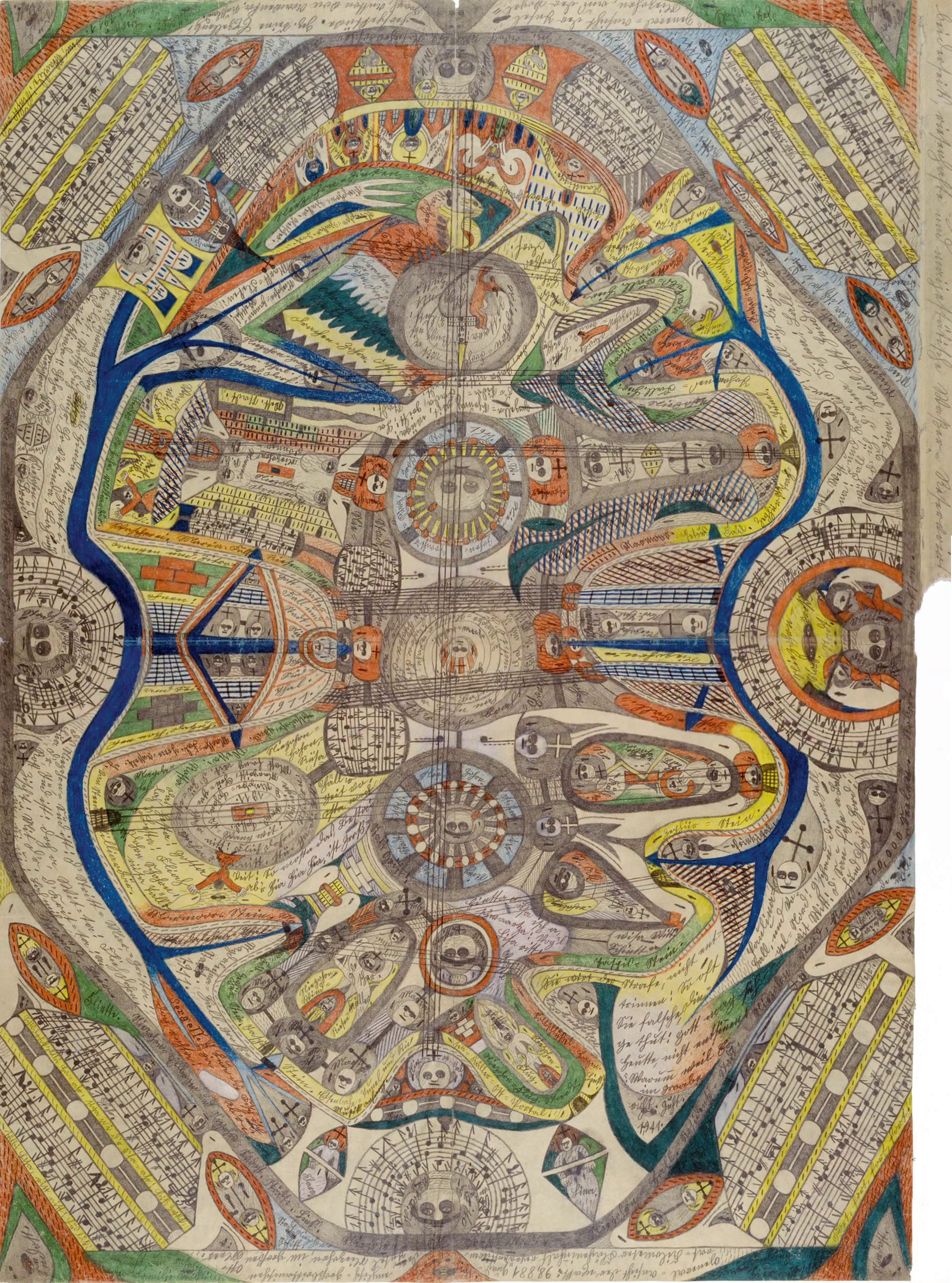
The paintings of the outsider artist Adolf Wölfli could be seen as a visual representation of formal thought disorder.

Thought process in the MSE refers to the quantity, tempo (rate of flow) and form (or logical coherence) of thought. Thought process cannot be directly observed but can only be described by the patient, or inferred from a patient's speech. Form of the thought is captured in this category. One should describe the thought form as thought directed A→B (normal), versus formal thought disorders. A pattern of interruption or disorganization of thought processes is broadly referred to as formal thought disorder, and might be described more specifically as thought blocking, fusion, loosening of associations, tangential thinking, derailment of thought, knight's move thinking. Thought may be described as 'circumstantial' when a patient includes a great deal of irrelevant detail and makes frequent diversions, but remains focused on the broad topic. Circumstantial thinking might be observed in anxiety disorders or certain kinds of personality disorders. Regarding the tempo of thought, some people may experience 'flight of ideas' (a manic symptom), when their thoughts are so rapid that their speech seems incoherent, although in flight of ideas a careful observer can discern a chain of poetic, syllabic, rhyming associations in the patient's speech (i.e., "I love to eat peaches, beach beaches, sand castles fall in the waves, braves are going to the finals, fee fi fo fum. Golden egg."). Alternatively an individual may be described as having retarded or inhibited thinking, in which thoughts seem to progress slowly with few associations. Poverty of thought is a global reduction in the quantity of thought and one of the negative symptoms of schizophrenia. It can also be a feature of severe depression or dementia. A patient with dementia might also experience thought perseveration. Thought perseveration refers to a pattern where a person keeps returning to the same limited set of ideas.

=== Thought content ===
A description of thought content would be the largest section of the MSE report. It would describe a patient's suicidal thoughts, depressed cognition, delusions, overvalued ideas, obsessions, phobias and preoccupations. One should separate the thought content into pathological thought, versus non-pathological thought. Importantly one should specify suicidal thoughts as either intrusive, unwanted, and not able to translate in the capacity to act on these thoughts (mens rea), versus suicidal thoughts that may lead to the act of suicide (actus reus).

Abnormalities of thought content are established by exploring individuals' thoughts in an open-ended conversational manner with regard to their intensity, salience, the emotions associated with the thoughts, the extent to which the thoughts are experienced as one's own and under one's control, and the degree of belief or conviction associated with the thoughts.

==== Delusions ====
A delusion has three essential qualities: it can be defined as "a false, unshakeable idea or belief (1) which is out of keeping with the patient's educational, cultural and social background (2) ... held with extraordinary conviction and subjective certainty (3)", and is a core feature of psychotic disorders. For instance an alliance to a particular political party, or sports team would not be considered a delusion in some societies.

The patient's delusions may be described within the SEGUE PM mnemonic as: somatic, erotomanic delusions, grandiose delusions, unspecified delusions, envious delusions (cf. delusional jealousy), persecutory or paranoid delusions, or multifactorial delusions. There are several other forms of delusions, these include descriptions such as: delusions of reference, or delusional misidentification, or delusional memories (e.g., "I was a lamb last year") among others.

Delusional symptoms can be reported as on a continuum from full symptoms (with no insight), partial symptoms (where they may start questioning these delusions) to nil symptoms (where symptoms are resolved). Delusional symptoms or ideas that remain after complete treatment and could develop into delusions can be characterized as residual symptoms.

Delusions can suggest several diseases such as schizophrenia, schizophreniform disorder, brief psychotic disorder, mania, depression with psychotic features, or delusional disorders. One can differentiate delusional disorders from schizophrenia for example by the age of onset for delusional disorders being older with a more complete and unaffected personality, where the delusion may only partially impact their life and be fairly encapsulated off from the rest of their formed personality—for example, believing that a spider lives in their hair, but this belief not affecting their work, relationships, or education. Whereas schizophrenia typically arises earlier in life with a disintegration of personality and a failure to cope with work, relationships, or education.

Other features differentiate diseases with delusions as well. Delusions may be described as mood-congruent (the delusional content in keeping with the mood), typical of manic or depressive psychosis, or mood-incongruent (delusional content not in keeping with the mood) which are more typical of schizophrenia. Delusions of control, or passivity experiences (in which the individual has the experience of the mind or body being under the influence or control of some kind of external force or agency), are typical of schizophrenia. Examples of this include experiences of thought withdrawal, thought insertion, thought broadcasting, and somatic passivity. Schneiderian first rank symptoms are a set of delusions and hallucinations which have been said to be highly suggestive of a diagnosis of schizophrenia. Delusions of guilt, delusions of poverty, and nihilistic delusions (belief that one has no mind or is already dead) are typical of depressive psychosis.

==== Overvalued Ideas ====
An overvalued idea is an emotionally charged belief that may be held with sufficient conviction to make believer emotionally charged or aggressive but that fails to possess all three characteristics of delusion—most importantly, incongruity with cultural norms. Therefore, any strong, fixed, false, but culturally normative belief can be considered an "overvalued idea". Hypochondriasis is an overvalued idea that one has an illness, dysmorphophobia that a part of one's body is abnormal, and anorexia nervosa that one is overweight or fat.

==== Obsessions ====
An obsession is an "undesired, unpleasant, intrusive thought that cannot be suppressed through the patient's volition", but unlike passivity experiences described above, they are not experienced as imposed from outside the patient's mind. Obsessions are typically intrusive thoughts of violence, injury, dirt or sex, or obsessive ruminations on intellectual themes. A person can also describe obsessional doubt, with intrusive worries about whether they have made the wrong decision, or forgotten to do something, for example turn off the gas or lock the house. In obsessive-compulsive disorder, the individual experiences obsessions with or without compulsions (a sense of having to carry out certain ritualized and senseless actions against their wishes).

==== Phobias ====
A phobia is "a dread of an object or situation that does not in reality pose any threat", and is distinct from a delusion in that the patient is aware that the fear is irrational. A phobia is usually highly specific to certain situations and will usually be reported by the patient rather than being observed by the clinician in the assessment interview.

==== Preoccupations ====
Preoccupations are thoughts which are not fixed, false or intrusive, but have an undue prominence in the person's mind. Clinically significant preoccupations would include thoughts of suicide, homicidal thoughts, suspicious or fearful beliefs associated with certain personality disorders, depressive beliefs (for example that one is unloved or a failure), or the cognitive distortions of anxiety and depression.

==== Suicidal thoughts ====
The MSE contributes to clinical risk assessment by including a thorough exploration of any suicidal or hostile thought content. Assessment of suicide risk includes detailed questioning about the nature of the person's suicidal thoughts, belief about death, reasons for living, and whether the person has made any specific plans to end his or her life. The most important questions to ask are: Do you have suicidal feeling now; have you ever attempted suicide (highly correlated with future suicide attempts); do you have plans to commit suicide in the future; and, do you have any deadlines where you may commit suicide (e.g., numerology calculation, doomsday belief, Mother's Day, anniversary, Christmas).

=== Perceptions ===
A perception in this context is any sensory experience, and the three broad types of perceptual disturbance are hallucinations, pseudohallucinations and illusions. A hallucination is defined as a sensory perception in the absence of any external stimulus, and is experienced in external or objective space (i.e. experienced by the subject as real). An illusion is defined as a false sensory perception in the presence of an external stimulus, in other words a distortion of a sensory experience, and may be recognized as such by the subject. A pseudohallucination is experienced in internal or subjective space (for example as "voices in my head") and is regarded as akin to fantasy. Other sensory abnormalities include a distortion of the patient's sense of time, for example déjà vu, or a distortion of the sense of self (depersonalization) or sense of reality (derealization).

Hallucinations can occur in any of the five senses, although auditory and visual hallucinations are encountered more frequently than tactile (touch), olfactory (smell) or gustatory (taste) hallucinations. Auditory hallucinations are typical of psychoses: third-person hallucinations (i.e. voices talking about the patient) and hearing one's thoughts spoken aloud (gedankenlautwerden or écho de la pensée) are among the Schneiderian first rank symptoms indicative of schizophrenia, whereas second-person hallucinations (voices talking to the patient) threatening or insulting or telling them to commit suicide, may be a feature of psychotic depression or schizophrenia. Visual hallucinations are generally suggestive of organic conditions such as epilepsy, drug intoxication or drug withdrawal. Many of the visual effects of hallucinogenic drugs are more correctly described as visual illusions or visual pseudohallucinations, as they are distortions of sensory experiences, and are not experienced as existing in objective reality. Auditory pseudohallucinations are suggestive of dissociative disorders. Déjà vu, derealization and depersonalization are associated with temporal lobe epilepsy and dissociative disorders.

=== Cognition ===
This section of the MSE covers the patient's level of alertness, orientation, attention, memory, visuospatial functioning, language functions and executive functions. Unlike other sections of the MSE, use is made of structured tests in addition to unstructured observation. Alertness is a global observation of level of consciousness, i.e. awareness of and responsiveness to the environment, and this might be described as alert, clouded, drowsy, or stuporous. Orientation is assessed by asking the patient where he or she is (for example what building, town and state) and what time it is (time, day, date).

Attention and concentration are assessed by several tests, commonly serial sevens test subtracting 7 from 100 and subtracting 7 from the difference 5 times. Alternatively: spelling a five-letter word backwards, saying the months or days of the week in reverse order, serial threes (subtract three from twenty five times), and by testing digit span. Memory is assessed in terms of immediate registration (repeating a set of words), short-term memory (recalling the set of words after an interval, or recalling a short paragraph), and long-term memory (recollection of well known historical or geographical facts). Visuospatial functioning can be assessed by the ability to copy a diagram, draw a clock face, or draw a map of the consulting room. Language is assessed through the ability to name objects, repeat phrases, and by observing the individual's spontaneous speech and response to instructions. Executive functioning can be screened for by asking the "similarities" questions ("what do x and y have in common?") and by means of a verbal fluency task (e.g. "list as many words as you can starting with the letter F, in one minute"). The mini-mental state examination is a simple structured cognitive assessment which is in widespread use as a component of the MSE.

Mild impairment of attention and concentration may occur in any mental illness where people are anxious and distractible (including psychotic states), but more extensive cognitive abnormalities are likely to indicate a gross disturbance of brain functioning such as delirium, dementia or intoxication. Specific language abnormalities may be associated with pathology in Wernicke's area or Broca's area of the brain. In Korsakoff's syndrome there is dramatic memory impairment with relative preservation of other cognitive functions. Visuospatial or constructional abnormalities here may be associated with parietal lobe pathology, and abnormalities in executive functioning tests may indicate frontal lobe pathology. This kind of brief cognitive testing is regarded as a screening process only, and any abnormalities are more carefully assessed using formal neuropsychological testing.

The MSE may include a brief neuropsychiatric examination in some situations. Frontal lobe pathology is suggested if the person cannot repetitively execute a motor sequence (e.g. "paper-scissors-rock"). The posterior columns are assessed by the person's ability to feel the vibrations of a tuning fork on the wrists and ankles. The parietal lobe can be assessed by the person's ability to identify objects by touch alone and with eyes closed. A cerebellar disorder may be present if the person cannot stand with arms extended, feet touching and eyes closed without swaying (Romberg's sign); if there is a tremor when the person reaches for an object; or if he or she is unable to touch a fixed point, close the eyes and touch the same point again. Pathology in the basal ganglia may be indicated by rigidity and resistance to movement of the limbs, and by the presence of characteristic involuntary movements. A lesion in the posterior fossa can be detected by asking the patient to roll his or her eyes upwards (Parinaud's syndrome). Focal neurological signs such as these might reflect the effects of some prescribed psychiatric medications, chronic drug or alcohol use, head injuries, tumors or other brain disorders.

=== Insight ===
The person's understanding of his or her mental illness is evaluated by exploring his or her explanatory account of the problem, and understanding of the treatment options. In this context, insight can be said to have three components: recognition that one has a mental illness, compliance with treatment, and the ability to re-label unusual mental events (such as delusions and hallucinations) as pathological. As insight is on a continuum, the clinician should not describe it as simply present or absent, but should report the patient's explanatory account descriptively.

Impaired insight is characteristic of psychosis and dementia, and is an important consideration in treatment planning and in assessing the capacity to consent to treatment. Anosognosia is the clinical term for the condition in which the patient is unaware of their neurological deficit or psychiatric condition.

=== Judgment ===
Judgment refers to the patient's capacity to make sound, reasoned and responsible decisions. One should frame judgement to the functions or domains that are normal versus impaired (e.g., poor judgement is isolated to petty theft, able to function in relationships, work, academics).

Traditionally, the MSE included the use of standard hypothetical questions such as "what would you do if you found a stamped, addressed envelope lying in the street?"; however contemporary practice is to inquire about how the patient has responded or would respond to real-life challenges and contingencies. Assessment would take into account the individual's executive system capacity in terms of impulsiveness, social cognition, self-awareness and planning ability.

Impaired judgment is not specific to any diagnosis but may be a prominent feature of disorders affecting the frontal lobe of the brain. If a person's judgment is impaired due to mental illness, there might be implications for the person's safety or the safety of others.

== Cultural considerations ==
There are potential problems when the MSE is applied in a cross-cultural context, when the clinician and patient are from different cultural backgrounds. For example, the patient's culture might have different norms for appearance, behavior and display of emotions. Culturally normative spiritual and religious beliefs need to be distinguished from delusions and hallucinations — these may seem similar to one who does not understand that they have different roots. Cognitive assessment must also take the patient's language and educational background into account. Clinician's racial bias is another potential confounder. Consultation with cultural leaders in community or clinicians when working with Aboriginal people can help guide if any cultural phenomena has been considered when completing an MSE with Aboriginal patients and things to consider from a cross-cultural context.

== Children ==
There are particular challenges in carrying out an MSE with young children and others with limited language such as people with intellectual impairment. The examiner would explore and clarify the individual's use of words to describe mood, thought content or perceptions, as words may be used idiosyncratically with a different meaning from that assumed by the examiner. In this group, tools such as play materials, puppets, art materials or diagrams (for instance with multiple choices of facial expressions depicting emotions) may be used to facilitate recall and explanation of experiences.

== See also ==
- Diagnostic classification and rating scales used in psychiatry
- Diagnostic and Statistical Manual of Mental Disorders
- DSM-IV Codes
- Glossary of psychiatry
- Self-administered Gerocognitive Examination (SAGE)
