= André Hurst =

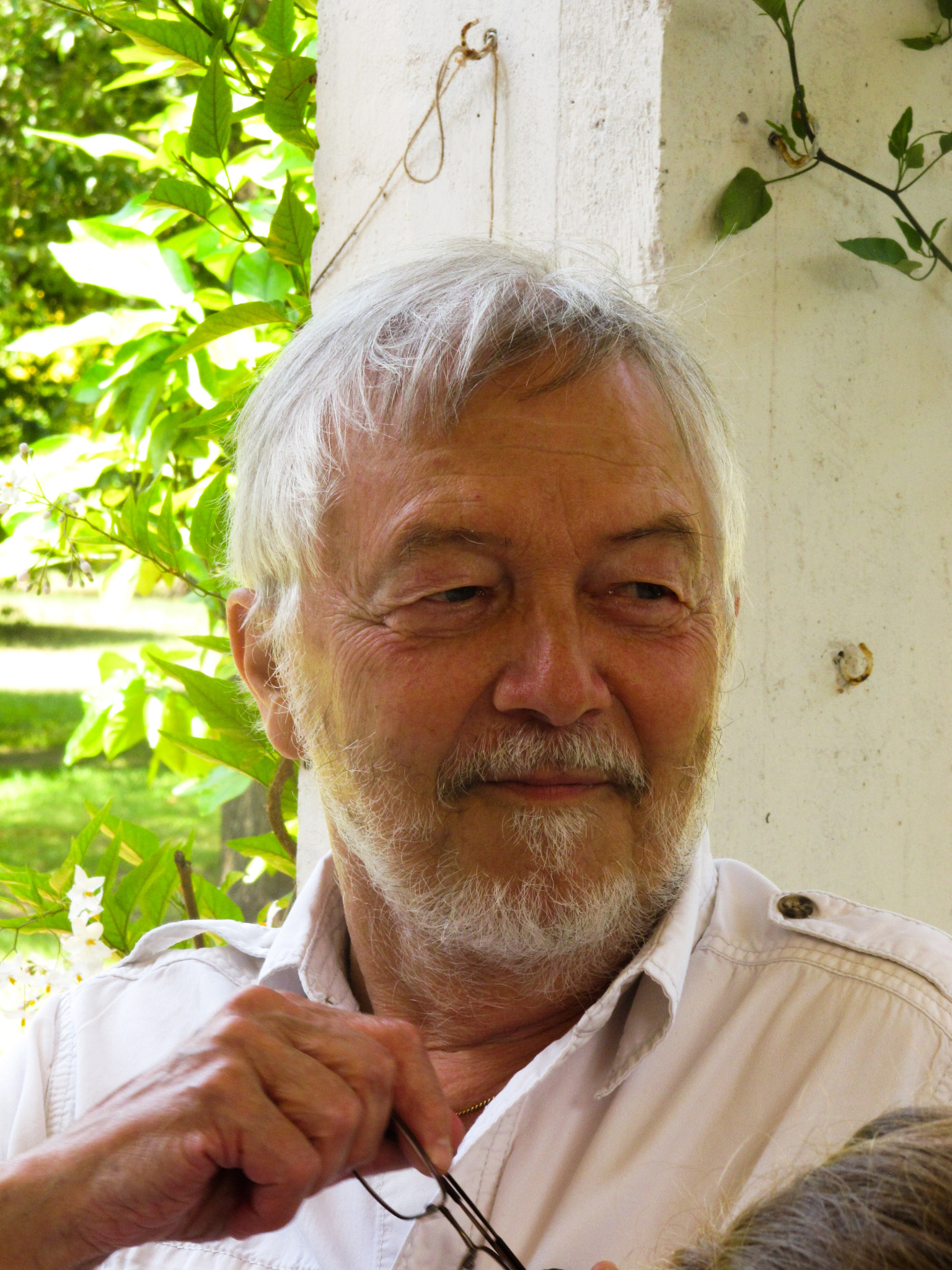
André Hurst

André Hurst, born 1940 in Geneva, is a Hellenist, professor and former Rector of the University of Geneva.

André Hurst is the author of books and articles mainly covering the domains of Greek Epics and ancient theatre; he has also been involved in the editions of papyri.

Educated in the Genevese public school system (licence ès lettres, then doctorate ès lettres at the University of Geneva), then in Rome (member of the Istituto svizzero di Roma) and LMU Munich; he obtained his first posting as professor at the University of Geneva in 1969 (obtaining tenure as ordinarius in 1983). He has been, successively, visiting professor at McGill University (Montreal), the Babeș-Bolyai University (Cluj-Napoca, Romania), the University of Lausanne (Switzerland), and Ecole Normale Supérieure at rue d’Ulm in Paris, as well as member of the senior common room at St John's College Oxford. For eight years, he was on the committee for the Conservatory of Music and the Performing Arts in Geneva, heading the committee several times; for eight years he held the chairmanship of the " Société académique de Genève " a private research fund, and was, for twelve years, in charge of collaborations of the University of Geneva with central and eastern European universities. From 2014 to 2017, he was a member of the scientific board of "École Pratique des Hautes Études" (Paris).

Also active in the musical life of Geneva (as evidenced by his presidency of the Conservatoire de musique de Genève), he is the instigator and co-founder of the "World Knowledge Dialogue". He presided the "WKD" Foundation during its first years of existence.

Distinctions: Honorary Doctorate from the Babeş-Bolyai University in Cluj-Napoca (Romania), 'Commander' of the Order of Merit of Romania, 'Officer' of the Order of Academic Palms of France, Gold Cross of the Order of the Phoenix of Greece.
