= Viorel Pană =

Romanian Air Force general

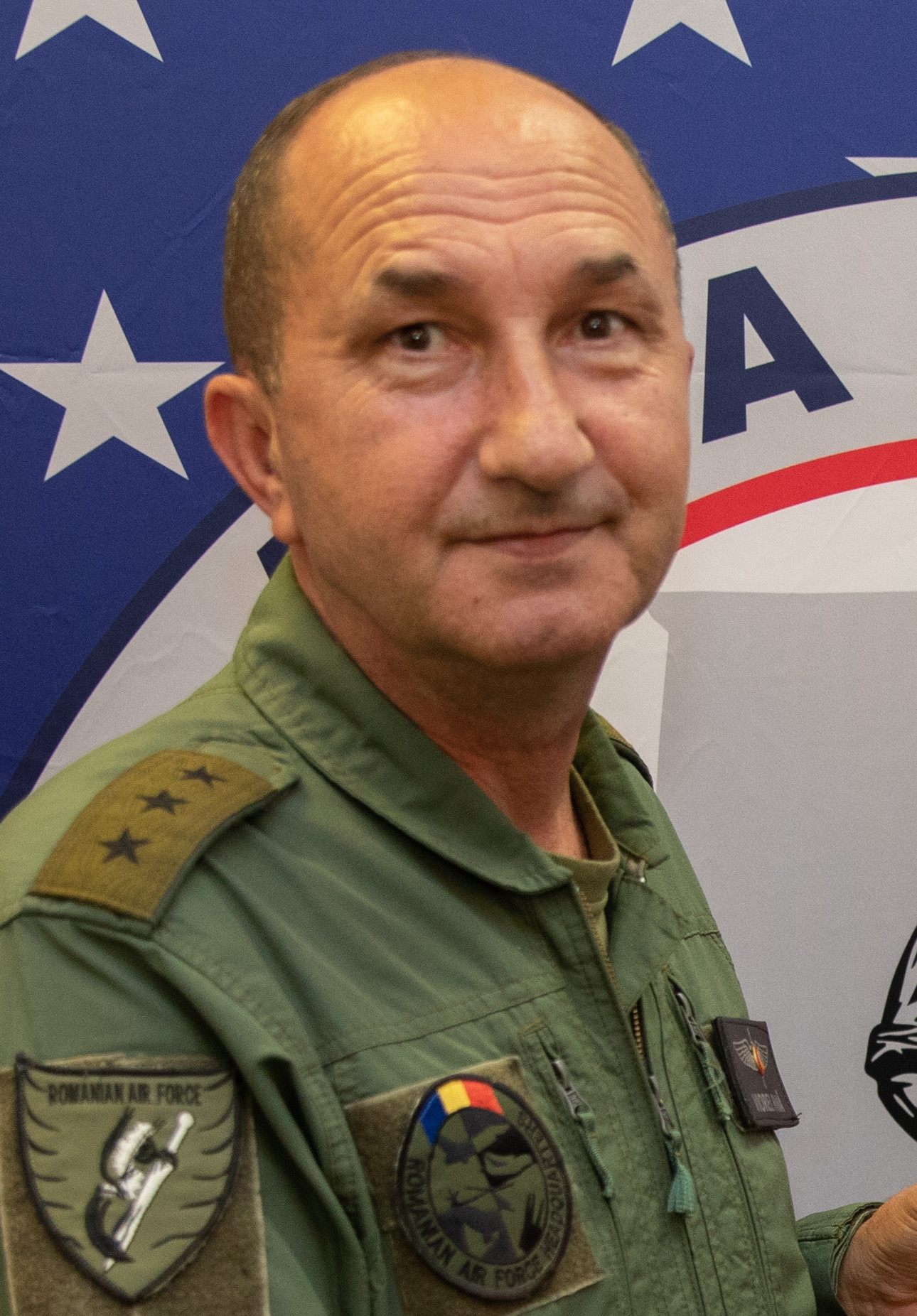
- Lt. Gen. Viorel Pană in 2023
- Born: 4 February 1967 (age 59); Găești, Dâmbovița County, Romania
- Allegiance: Romania
- Branch: Romanian Air Force
- Service years: 1985 – 2023
- Rank: Lieutenant General
- Commands: Chief of the Air Force Staff; 90th Airlift Base; 901st Air Transport Squadron
- Conflicts: Iraq War; Afghanistan War
- Awards: Legion of Merit; Ordre national du Mérite; Order of Aeronautical Virtue; Emblem of Honor of the Romanian Army; Emblem of Honor of the General Staff; Emblem of Honor of the Air Force; Honorific sign "În Serviciul Patriei"
- Alma mater: Carol I National Defence University
- Children: one daughter

Viorel Pană (born 1967) is a general of the Romanian Air Force who served as the Air Force Chief of Staff between 2017 and 2023. Pană started his military career in 1985 after graduating from the Dimitrie Cantemir Military High School in Breaza. From 1989 he flew as a fighter pilot on MiG-21 fighters, eventually transitioning to transport aircraft in 1992.

He has more than 3,000 flight hours on the C-130 Hercules and C-27J Spartan, and flew over 200 missions in operation theatres in Irak, Afghanistan, Bosnia, and Kosovo. He was assigned as Chief of Staff of the Air Force in 2017, having previously served as commander of the 90th Airlift Base.

== Early life and military career ==
Viorel Pană was born on 4 February 1967 in Găești, Dâmbovița County. He started his military career by attending Dimitrie Cantemir Military High School in Breaza, from which he graduated in 1985. He continued his studies at the Aurel Vlaicu Military School of Aviation Officers graduating in 1989 and eventually becoming a MiG-21 fighter pilot, being assigned to the Fighter Aviation Regiment from Deveselu.

He continued his service as a fighter pilot until 1992, when he transferred to flying transport aircraft at the 90th Airlift Base, starting with the An-24, then continuing with the C-130 and C-27J. After graduating from the Carol I National Defence University in 2007, he returned to the base, becoming commander of the C-130 Hercules squadron. From 2011, he became deputy commander of the base (at that time the 90th Air Flotilla), and from 2014 becoming its commander. In 2010, he obtained the title of doctor in Military Sciences and Intelligence from the Carol I National Defence University.

During his career as a pilot, Pană logged over 3,000 flight hours, also serving as a C-130 and C-27J instructor. He participated in more than 200 missions in operation theaters in Irak, Afghanistan, Bosnia–Herzegovina, and Kosovo, as well as in participating and leading missions in-country and abroad in Libya, Montenegro, China, and Mali. On one such mission in Afghanistan having to command a C-130 with engine problems during a night flight from Kabul.

He was named Air Force Chief of Staff on 11 October 2017, succeeding Major general Laurian Anastasof.

On 30 November 2023, Gen. Pană went into reserve, being succeeded as Chief of Staff by Major general Leonard Baraboi.

== Education ==
- 1989 Aurel Vlaicu Military School of Aviation Officers, Boboc
- 1996 Squadron Officer Course, Maxwell AFB, Alabama, United States
- 2000 Postgraduate course in the management of joint operations, NATO Training Center, Bucharest
- 2005 Operational level planning course, Oberamergau, Germany
- 2007 Carol I National Defence University, Bucharest
- 2008 Faculty of Communication and Public Relations, SNSPA, Bucharest
- 2010 PhD in Military Sciences and Intelligence, Carol I National Defence University, Bucharest;
- 2014 Postgraduate course in the field of national security, National Defense College, Bucharest

== Decorations ==
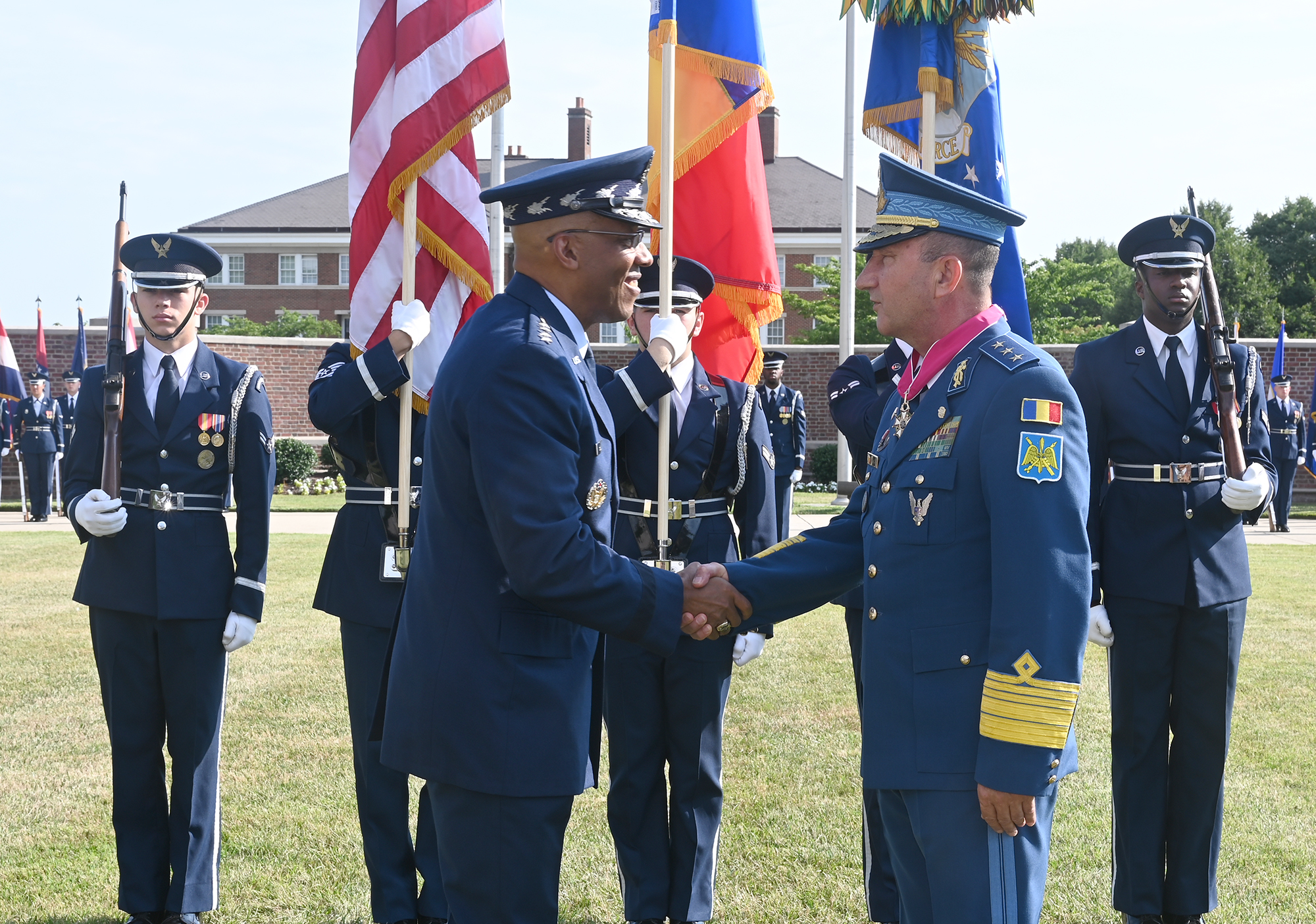
Lt. Gen. Viorel Pană being presented with the Legion of Merit by Gen. Charles Q. Brown Jr.

=== Romania ===
- Order of Aeronautical Virtue Knight and Officer Class
- Emblem of Honor of the Romanian Army
- Emblem of Honor of the General Staff
- Emblem of Honor of the Air Force
- Honorific sign "În Serviciul Patriei"

=== France ===
- Ordre national du Mérite Officer rank

=== United States ===
- Legion of Merit

== Ranks ==
- Lieutenant (1989–1992)
- Senior lieutenant (1992–1996)
- Captain (1996–1999)
- Lieutenant Commander (1999–2007)
- Captain Commander (2007–2010)
- Commander (2010–2014)
- Air Flotilla General (2014–2018)
- Major General (2018–2021)
- Lieutenant General (2021–present)
