= Romanian decorations =

The term Romanian decorations may refer to one of the following:

- Orders, decorations, and medals of Romania, orders and medals currently awarded by the President of Romania, known by law as The National Decorations System
- Decorations of the Romanian Armed Forces, honorific distinctions currently awarded by the Ministry of National Defense
- Decorations of the Romanian Orthodox Church, crosses awarded by the Patriarch of All Romania and by the Metropolitans
- Decorations of the Romanian Royal House, orders and medals awarded by King Mihai I of Romania
