= Sean Conley =

American physician (born 1980)

Commander Sean Conley
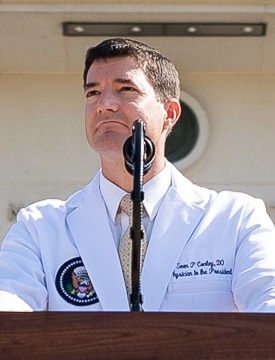
- Conley addressing the press during President Trump's COVID-19 hospitalization, 2020

Physician to the President
- In office March 28, 2018 – January 25, 2021; Acting: March 28 – May 4, 2018
- President: Donald Trump; Joe Biden
- Preceded by: Ronny Jackson
- Succeeded by: Kevin O'Connor

Personal details
- Born: Sean Patrick Conley; 1980 (age 45–46) Doylestown, Pennsylvania, U.S.
- Spouse: Kristin Conley
- Children: 3
- Education: University of Notre Dame (BS); Philadelphia College of Osteopathic Medicine (DO)

Military service
- Allegiance: United States
- Branch/service: United States Navy
- Rank: Commander
- Battles/wars: War in Afghanistan
- Awards: Romanian Emblem of Honor

Sean Patrick Conley (born 1980) is an American physician and United States Navy officer who served as the physician to the president from 2018 to 2021. Conley served as physician to president Donald Trump during the COVID-19 pandemic, often serving as the president's medical advisor, and treating the president when he tested positive for COVID-19. He is currently Director and acting Chief Medical Officer of the Office of Health Security as part of the Department of Homeland Security (DHS).

== Early life and education ==
Conley, born in 1980 in Doylestown, Pennsylvania, graduated from Central Bucks High School East in 1998 and received his bachelor's degree from the University of Notre Dame in 2002.

Conley received his Doctor of Osteopathic Medicine degree from the Philadelphia College of Osteopathic Medicine in 2006. He is a 2013 graduate of the Emergency Medicine Residency Program of Naval Medical Center Portsmouth in Portsmouth, Virginia. He received the Honor Graduate Award, Nurses' Choice Award for Outstanding Senior Resident Award, and the Resident Research Award.

== Career ==
=== Military service ===
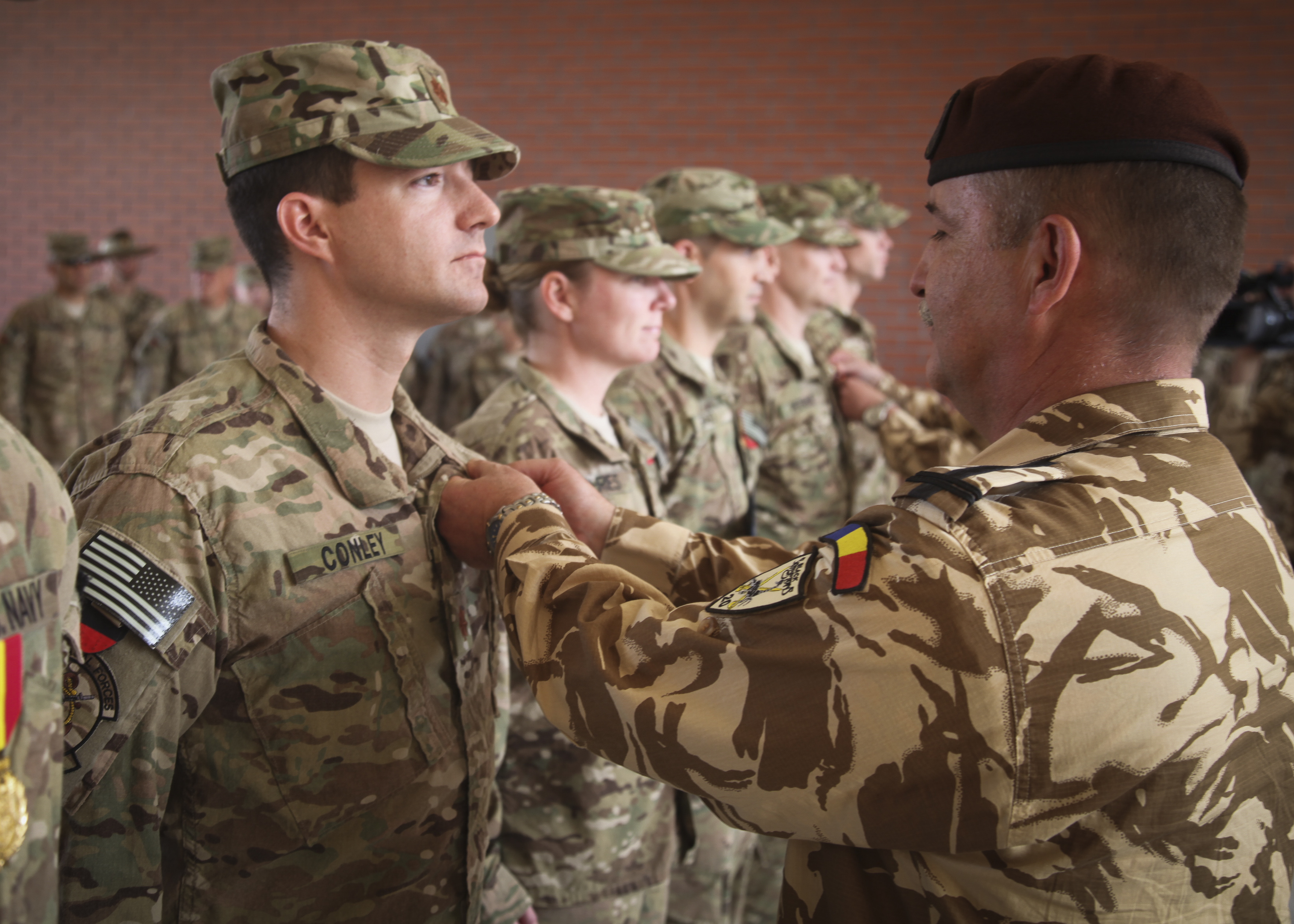
Conley received a Romanian Emblem of Honor for his team saving the life of a Romanian soldier injured in an IED blast.

In 2014, he served as an emergency physician with the International Security Assistance Force at Kandahar International Airport outside the city of Kandahar, Afghanistan. He was assigned to NATO Role 3 MMU, and was appointed head of the trauma department. The unit received a commendation from the Romanian Land Forces for saving the life of a Romanian soldier injured by an improvised explosive device in 2014. He served as the research director at Portsmouth Navy Department of Emergency Medicine prior to his assignment to the White House Medical Unit.

=== Physician to the President ===
Conley became the physician to the president upon the nomination of the previous physician, Ronny Jackson, for Secretary of Veterans Affairs. He became the acting White House physician on March 28, 2018, and on May 4, 2018, became the physician to the president.

On May 18, 2020, President Donald Trump surprised listeners when he revealed he was taking hydroxychloroquine as a preventive measure against COVID-19. He confirmed that he was taking it under the guidance of Conley, who later issued a confirmation. Several medical warnings had been issued against the drug's use for treating COVID-19.

In the early morning of October 2, 2020, the White House announced that President Trump and First Lady Melania Trump had tested positive for COVID-19 after they were tested as a precaution when Trump's top aide, Hope Hicks, tested positive. At first, Trump began self-isolating in the White House, but under the recommendation of Conley, he was transferred to Walter Reed National Military Medical Center. He drew scrutiny regarding his public assessments of Trump's health during the president's hospitalization. In contradiction to Conley's previous statements surrounding hydroxychloroquine, he released a statement to White House press secretary Kayleigh McEnany that he had decided to place Trump under an antiviral therapy, specifically remdesivir. Conley described Trump's symptoms on the day of the announcement as "fatigued but in good spirits". Conley incorrectly identified a Regeneron product of monoclonal antibodies as a polyclonal antibody cocktail in a press release. Later, he updated Trump's symptoms as "nasal congestion and a cough and fatigue." With regard to the first lady, Conley described her as "well with only a mild cough and headache."

On the morning of October 3, Conley gave a press briefing regarding Trump's health, stating that he and his team of physicians were "extremely happy" with the president's condition, and noting that most of the president's symptoms had subsided. However, Conley stated that Trump was "72 hours into this diagnosis" which implied that Trump had attended a rally in Minnesota, knowing he was a potential COVID-19 vector at the time. The 72 hour remark was quickly corrected by a press release indicating that the president was diagnosed the evening of October 1.

'Sean Conley, Physician to the President, Provides an Update on President Trump' – video courtesy of the White House.

On the evening of October 3, Conley warned that Trump was "not yet out of the woods" with regard to his condition.

In an October 4 press conference, Trump's medical team said that he was "doing really well" after his oxygen level dipped the day before and after he was given the steroid dexamethasone, which works by reducing inflammation in the lungs. Asked if CT scans showed pneumonia or lung damage, Conley said, "There's some expected findings, but nothing of any major clinical concern." He declined to say what was found, citing HIPAA guidelines that ensure patient privacy. When asked why he was reluctant to disclose that Trump had been given oxygen during the October 3 briefing, Conley stated that he did not want to "give any information that might steer the course of illness in another direction" and "it came off that we're trying to hide something, which wasn't necessarily true." White House director of strategic communications Alyssa Farah later stated that it was "a common medical practice that you want to convey confidence, and you want to raise the spirits of the person you're treating," while also asserting that Meadows' anonymous statement to reporters was intended to "give you guys more information just to try to be as transparent as we can".

At 2:37 p.m. EDT on October 5, Trump tweeted that he would be discharged from the hospital at 6:30 p.m. that day. However, doctors said in an afternoon news briefing that Trump continued to be treated with dexamethasone and remdesivir. The prospect of Trump's early release astonished infectious-disease experts, who noted that Trump planned to be discharged in a period when COVID-19 patients are particularly vulnerable (7–10 days after symptoms first appear) to unpredictable and rapid declines in condition. Outside physicians stated that the depiction of Trump's illness as relatively mild was inconsistent with the aggressive treatment he was receiving. Trump's medical team made cryptic remarks about his status and declined to say whether Trump's CT scans contained indications of pneumonia or lung damage.

In the White House, Trump continued to receive dexamethasone and remdesivir. He conducted business without wearing a mask. Conley said in a memo that Trump has "no symptoms" and is doing "extremely well." That optimistic message was later called into question. According to the Associated Press, "then-White House chief of staff Mark Meadows said at the time that Trump's condition was worse than Conley had let on".

Newly inaugurated president Joe Biden announced on January 25, 2021, that he would appoint Kevin O'Connor as the White House physician. According to a CNN report, "Conley was seen departing the White House alongside Trump" on January 20, 2021. The AP reported that Conley would be taking on a "teaching role" at the Uniformed Services University of the Health Sciences.

=== Department of Homeland Security ===
After Trump assumed office for the second time, in 2025, Conley was appointed Chief Medical Officer at the U.S. Department of Homeland Security. He has denied reports of the mistreatment of inmates held in DHS detention centers, saying "This is better, more responsive healthcare than many aliens have ever received in their entire lives."

Military offices
Preceded by Ronny Jackson	Physician to the President; 2018–2021	Succeeded by Kevin O'Connor
