= Cross of Faithful Service =

Cross of Faithful Service Crucea națională "Serviciul Credincios"
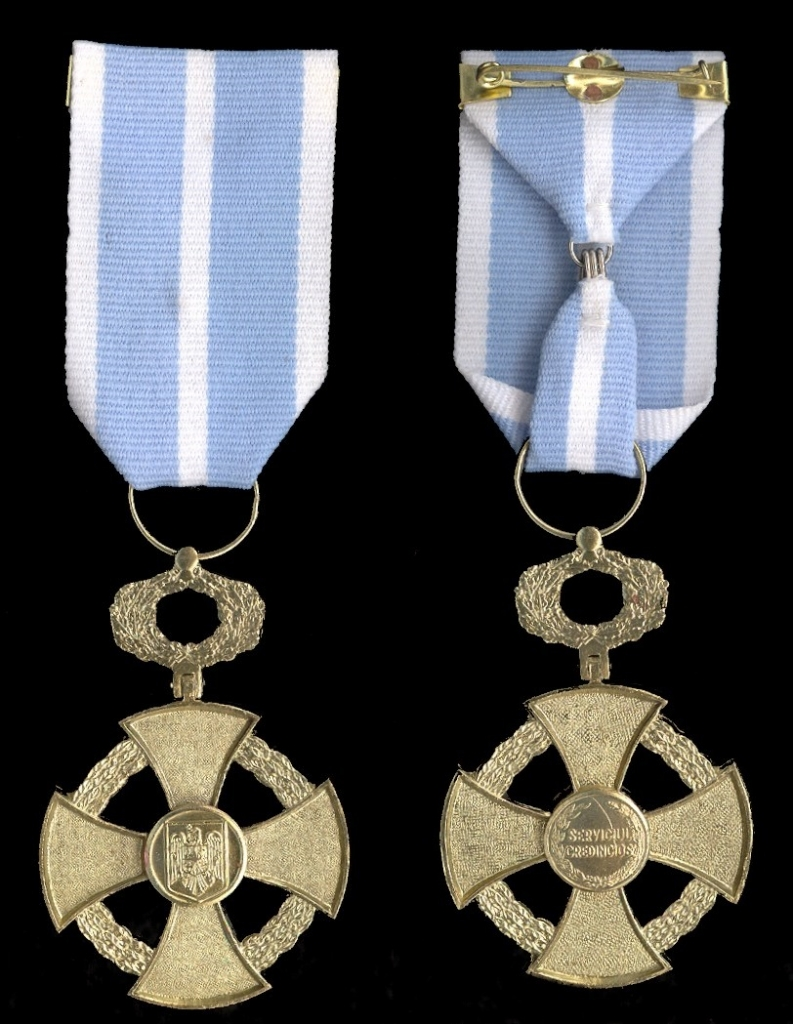
- Faithful Service Cross, Third Class, civil division (modern version)
- Type: Multiple classes civil and military national cross (listed from lowest to highest): Third Class; Second Class; First Class
- Awarded for: (1) Exceptional civil and military services to the Romanian State and the Romanian people; (2) For special acts in time of peace or for heroic acts in time of war; (3) For contributing to the development of the friendship relations with Romania, or for other exceptional services to the Romanian State and the Romanian People
- Country: Romania
- Presented by: The King of Romania (1906 - 1947); The President of Romania (since 2000)
- Eligibility: (1) Civil, military; (2) military units; (3) foreign citizens
- Status: Currently awarded
- Established: 1906 reestablished 2000
- Ribbon bar of the cross

Precedence
- Next (higher): National Order for Merit
- Next (lower): Medal of Faithful Service
- Related: Order of Faithful Service

The Cross of Faithful Service (Romanian: Crucea națională "Serviciul Credincios") was instituted by King Carol I in 1906, as a two class cross. In early 1948, together with the Order and Medal of Faithful Service as well as all the traditional Romanian orders, it was discontinued by the Communist Government of Romania.

In 2000 it was re-instituted together with the Order and Medal, as a three class cross. It is the highest state decoration for people without higher education, and the third highest in the National System of Decorations of Romania.
