= Florinel Enache =

- Born: January 8, 1974 (age 52); Gura Caliței, Vrancea County, Romania
- Spouse: Lămâița Enache
- Children: 1
- Military career
- Allegiance: Romania
- Branch: Romanian Land Forces
- Rank: Sergeant Major
- Awards: Medal of Faithful Service, First Class

Florinel Enache (born January 8, 1974 in Gura Caliței) is a Romanian soldier with over 23 years of service, seriously injured on May 4, 2012, while on a research and recon mission in Zabul Province, Highway A1, Afghanistan.

Sergeant Major Florinel Enache who was part of the 282 Mechanized Infantry Battalion that carried out missions in Afghanistan's Zabul Province. The 282 battalion from Focșani (East) sent mid-January 2012, a number of 600 troops to Afghanistan for a six-month rotation. Enache was grievously injured on May 4, 2012. The military was rushed at Laghman, Afghanistan and then to Landstuhl, Germany, where doctors tried to save his life. The sub-officer (NCO) suffered severe wounds from the blast of an improvised explosive device while being on a scouting land mission to secure an objective on A1 highway in Afghanistan. He suffered severe wounds from a detonated explosive device (EAD). Both legs were amputated from the pelvis area and his left arm from above the elbow. Also, he suffered a numerous contusions and back injuries.

Enache was brought to Walter Reed National Military Medical Center on May 26, 2012. In August 2012 the Embassy of Romania in Washington, D.C. sent out a humanitarian call for Romanian Soldier Florinel Enache. On March 6, 2013, Enache was visited at the Walter Reed Medical Center by the President of the United States Barack Obama. A photo provided by the White House and posted on the Facebook page of the Embassy of the United States in Bucharest, President Obama standing by the side of Enache who lies on a hospital bed at the hospital in Bethesda, Maryland.

Enache was transported back to his native country of Romania on May 13, 2013, and he arrived in his homeland on May 15 on a US Air Force aircraft. He was welcomed by the Romanian Minister of Defense, Mircea Dușa. His Romanian Unit comrades welcomed him as well. It was the first time since the accident that they got to see Sergeant Major Enache.

== Awards ==
- Medal of Faithful Service, First Class awarded by the President of Romania Traian Băsescu
