= Florentin Cruceru =

Romanian former football midfielder

Personal information
- Full name: Florentin Cruceru
- Date of birth: March 25, 1981 (age 45)
- Place of birth: Găești, Romania
- Height: 1.78 m (5 ft 10 in)
- Position: Midfielder

Senior career*
| Years | Team | Apps | (Gls) |
| 1999–2006 | Sportul Studențesc | 132 | (6) |
| 2006–2008 | Argeș Pitești | 25 | (0) |
| 2008–2009 | Farul Constanța | 10 | (0) |
| 2009–2011 | Sportul Studențesc | 45 | (1) |
| 2011–2012 | Juventus București | 0 | (0) |
| Total | | 212 | (7) |
- * Club domestic league appearances and goals as of 17 July 2018

Florentin Cruceru (born 25 March 1981) is a Romanian former football midfielder who played in his career for teams such as: Sportul Studențesc, Argeș Pitești or Farul Constanța.
