= Romanian-American Chamber of Commerce =

- Founded: 1990
- Founder: Mark A. Meyer
- Founded at: New York
- Type: Advocacy group
- Purpose: Business advocacy, diplomatic relations
- Location: Washington, D.C., Florida, California, Mid-West
- Region served: Romania
- Key people: Mark A. Meyer President, Elias Wexler, Vice President, Armand Scala, Vice President
- Website: Romanian-American Chamber of Commerce Official Website

The Romanian-American Chamber of Commerce is a bilateral trade and investment organization that promotes commerce and investment between Romania and United States, and is headquartered in Washington D.C. The Chamber is composed of both Romanian and American businesses and has active chapters in New York, Washington, D.C., Florida, California and the Mid-West. It was founded in February 1990 and is celebrating its 20th year of activity in 2010. The RACC conducts a broad range of events, activities, and services and is a member organization of the Bi-National European Chambers of Commerce of the United States, which includes most of the bilateral chambers of the major EU member states.

== History ==
Shortly after the Romanian revolution of December 1989, a group of American business leaders and professionals led by Mark A. Meyer met to discuss the formation of a bilateral trade association dedicated to the development of prosperous business relationships between Romania and the United States. Initial members included representatives of major US firms, such as IBM, Coca-Cola, Deloitte & Touche, Chemical Bank, Colgate-Palmolive, Caterpillar, ConAgra and General Electric, as well as smaller import export companies. In February 1990 they organized the Romanian-American Chamber of Commerce (RACC).

The Ambassadorial Advisory Board of the Romanian American Chamber of Commerce™ was formed in 2013 and is composed of the living former U.S. Ambassadors to Romania and the former Romanian Ambassadors to the United States and United Nations. It is chaired by former U.S. Ambassador, Senator James C. Rosapepe, and its members include former U.S. Ambassadors to Romania John R. Davis, Alfred Moses, Michael Guest and Mark Gitenstein, and former Romanian Ambassadors Mircea Geoană, Sorin Ducaru, Ion Gorita, Alexandru Niculescu and Mihnea Motoc. Among its functions, the Ambassadorial Advisory Board holds webinars for the public to discuss current issues in U.S.-Romanian relations and each year, the RACC holds an annual dinner in the Advisory Board’s honor at which the Armand Scala Prize is awarded.

== See also ==
- Chamber of commerce
- Romanian American
- United States Chamber of Commerce
