= Eagle of Romania =

Semnul Onorific "Vulturul României"
- The Grand Cross sign
- Type: Multiple grade civilian honorific sign for parliamentarians
- Country: Romania
- Presented by: The King of Romania (1933 - 1947); The President of Romania (since 2004)
- Eligibility: Romanian Senators and Deputies
- Established: 1933; 2004
- Final award: disbanded in 1947

Precedence
- Equivalent: National Order of Faithful Service

The Honorific Sign "Eagle of Romania" (Semnul Onorific "Vulturul României") is a special decoration, part of the National Decorations System, awarded to Romanian Parliamentarians, members of the Senate or of the Chamber of Deputies. It also can be awarded to foreign parliamentarians for its special contribution in the development of parliamentarian relations with Romania.

According to the Law no. 29/2000, the honorific sign "The Eagle of Romania" is assimilated to the National Order of Faithful Service, at equal ranks.

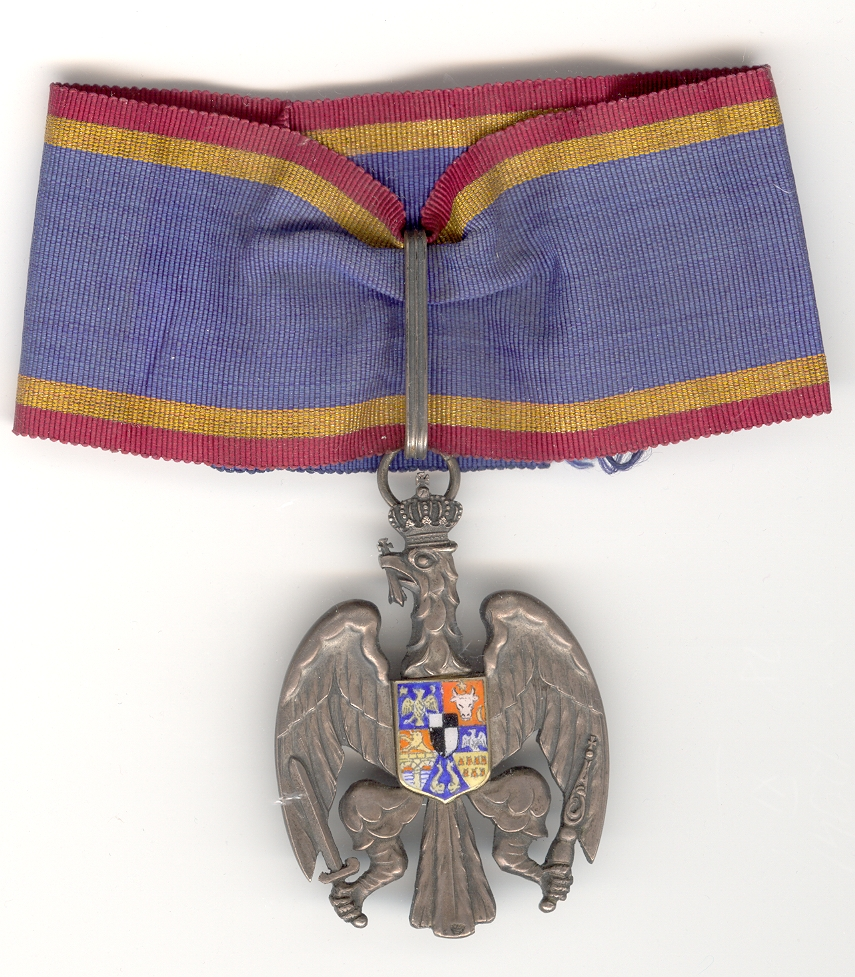
The 1933 model, Commodore rank second class

The award was created by Royal Decree during the reign of King Carol II to reward parliamentarians (D.R. nr. 2306/1933). As all of the other insignia, this order was disbanded after 1947, when King Mihai I was forced to abdicate, and the People's Republic was established.

After the fall of communism, this decoration was first mentioned in the Law no. 29/2000, Establishing the National Decoration System. It was re-established by the Law no. 221/2004.

This decoration was not and could not be awarded until 2011, due to technical reasons.
