= Mark A. Meyer =

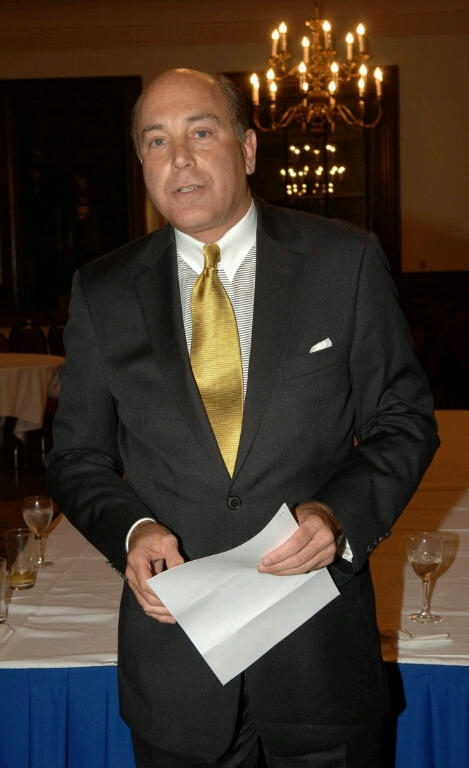

Mark A. Meyer (born 1946 in New York) is the founder and President of the Romanian-American Chamber of Commerce (1990) and the Moldovan-American Chamber of Commerce (1993). In recognition of his contributions to the business relations and cultural understanding between these respective nations and the United States, he was awarded Romania's National Order of Merit in the rank of Commander in 2004, and Moldova's highest civilian decoration, the Medal of Civic Merit, in 2006. He is a practicing attorney and an adjunct professor of law at St. John's University School of Law among other positions.

== Role in Romania's transition to democracy ==
Meyer's involvement in Romania began in February 1990, less than two months after the trial and execution of former Communist leader Nicolae Ceaușescu by revolutionaries, Meyer and others organized the Romanian-American Chamber of Commerce (the RACC) as an independent bilateral organization devoted to improving Romania–United States relations, with Meyer as its first president, a position he still holds.

The RACC played a significant role in helping to change Western perceptions of Romania. The country's first post-Communist president, Ion Iliescu, was perceived by some Western leaders as a Communist in the Ceaușescu mold. On October 4, 1990, the RACC held a meeting introducing Iliescu to numerous US business leaders in New York, followed in November 1990 with a conference held in Bucharest designed to attract Western investment. Beginning in 1991, the RACC hosted monthly meetings in Washington, D.C. for the purposes of introducing major Romanian political leaders to US business and political leaders. Romanian Prime Ministers Petre Roman, Radu Vasile, Mugur Isărescu, Victor Ciorbea, and Adrian Năstase, as well as Presidents Iliescu and Emil Constantinescu were all attendees at such events, which served to deepen ties between the United States and Romania.

In December 1993, the RACC's role in obtaining Most Favored Nation Trading Status for Romania was recognized by receipt of the Libertatea Award.

In 2002, in part through the lobbying efforts of the RACC and related organizations such as the congress of Romanian Americans led by its president, Armand Scala, who is also a National Vice President of the RACC, Romania joined NATO. The acceptance was followed by President George W. Bush's historic visit to Bucharest on November 23, 2002.

== First U.S. law firm to open in Romania ==
In 1992, Meyer helped found the first Western law firm to open in Romanian when the U.S. law firm in which he was a partner, Hall Dickler, Lawler, Kent & Friedman opened offices in Bucharest. Meyer is a name member in the law firm of Rubin Meyer Doru & Trandafir SCA in Bucharest http://hr.ro/, the predecessor of which was founded by him and three other attorneys in 1995. The firm played a prominent role in the privatization of a number of Romanian state-owned businesses in the 1990s.

The firm has also been involved in prominent matters more recently, such as the representation of the Malaxa and Ausnit families, industrialists in pre-Communist times who presently hold 8% of the Fondul Proprietatea, an investment fund distributed as restitution to victims of Communism.

== Coverage in the Romanian Media ==
As a result of his relationship with Ion Iliescu, Democratic Romania's first President, as well as its second President, Emil Constantinescu, and general public interest in Romanian relations with the United States, Meyer was frequently covered by the Romanian press, particularly in the 1990s, when his photo was displayed on the front page of the Curierul National on at least three occasions, each in connection with US-Romanian relations. He was also prominently featured in other national publications in that period, including in the Cronica Romana and the Vocea Romaniei, and appeared numerous times on Romanian State Television.

Since that time, he has remained a steady topic of media coverage in Romania, including in connection with the restitution of Bran Castle, purported home of Count Dracula, to children of Princess Ileana of the Romanian royal family in 2006 He is often the target of attacks in the media by hyper-nationalistic right-wing groups, who point to his prominence as proof of their anti-Semitic conspiracy theories.

== Activities relating to Moldova ==
In addition to his activities relating to Romania, Meyer has been prominently involved in promoting US-Moldovan relations. The Moldovan-American Chamber of Commerce (the MACC) was created in 1993 as a non-profit corporation to facilitate cooperation between U.S. and Moldovan businesses, with Meyer as its president, a position he still holds. The MACC has held luncheons and dinners in the United States for Moldova's Presidents Mircea Snegur, Petru Lucinschi and Vladimir Voronin, as well as many of its other leaders. For example, in early 2010, MACC members attended a private dinner in New York with Moldovan Prime Minister Vlad Filat and Foreign Minister Iurie Leanca in New York.

When Meyer was Chair of the European Affairs Committee of the Association of the Bar of the City of New York, he led the mission that authored a 2006 report on the violations of international law in Transnistria. This document later became a formal United Nations document and formed the basis for a resolution of the Government of Moldova adopting a plan of action to utilize the rule of law to resolve the Transnistrian crisis.

On October 13, 2011, Meyer was appointed to the World Bank's Panel of Arbitrators of the International Center for the Settlement of Investment Disputes (ICSID) for a six-year term by designation of the Republic of Moldova. ICSID is the leading international arbitration institution devoted to investor-State dispute settlement.

On February 7, 2012, Meyer was appointed by the Foreign Ministry of the Republic of Moldova as Honorary Consul of Moldova for the State New York and reappointed in 2018 for another six-year term.

== First U.S. law firm to open in Myanmar ==
On July 29, 2013, Mr. Meyer spearheaded the opening of the first American law firm to open a licensed law office in Myanmar, as well as the first U.S. investor in the professional services industry to hold a 100% ownership interest under the new 2012 Myanmar Investment Law, named Herzfeld, Rubin, Meyer & Rose Law Firm LTD and located in Yangon, Myanmar. Due, in part, to the Rakhine crisis, the office in Yangon closed in 2018, but the Firm will continue its Myanmar-related activities.

== Awards and honors ==
In recognition of his contributions to the business relations and cultural understanding between these respective nations and the United States, he was awarded Romania's National Order of Merit in the rank of Commander in 2004, and Moldova's highest civilian decoration, the Medal of Civic Merit, in 2006. In 2004, Meyer was named a Harvard Law School Traphagen Distinguished Alumnus for his "great skill in the economic, legal and political transformation of a developing region" (referring to Romania, Moldova and neighboring countries such as Montenegro). He is also the recipient of Fairleigh Dickinson University's Pinnacle Award, its highest honor for distinguished alumni.

In 2007, St. John's University School of Law conferred upon Meyer the degree of Doctor of Laws, honoris causa, describing him as "a pioneer in promoting the rule of law in Central and Eastern Europe since 1990."

He has served as an associate professor of law and chair of the Anglo-Saxon Law Department at Universitatea Creștină Dimitrie Cantemir in Romania, an honorary position. He also serves as vice president of the Congress of Romanian Americans — the only non-Romanian-American to be an officer or director of that organization.

On May 17, 2011, Fairleigh Dickinson University bestowed the degree of Doctor of Humane Letters, honoris causa, upon Mark A. Meyer. The university citation reads, in part: "Fairleigh Dickinson applauds you as an honored son for embracing the promise of other cultures, working tirelessly to promote the rule of law in a developing region and building international relationships based on mutual cooperation." In his commencement address Meyer told the nearly 3,000 graduates that "the future belongs to those who believe in the beauty of their dreams." Mr. Meyer is a member of the Executive Council of Fairleigh Dickinson University's School of Public and Global Affairs and lectures there on Foreign Investment in Emerging Markets.

== Professional and Personal Background ==
Meyer is an attorney admitted to practice in the state of New York and is a member of Herzfeld & Rubin, P.C. He received an undergraduate degree from Fairleigh Dickinson University in 1968, a juris doctor degree from St. John's University School of Law in 1971 and an LLM degree from Harvard Law School in 1972. He has been teaching a course on Transactions in Emerging Markets at St. John's University School of Law since 2005 as an adjunct professor of law.

In 2021, Meyer became Chair of the New York City Bar Association's Council on International Affairs, which coordinates the activities of the 16 New York City Bar Association committees addressing international affairs and considers broad-based international and comparative law issues. He has also been the Chair of the Foreign and Comparative Law Committee of the New York City Bar Association and, while Chair of the European Affairs Committee of the New York City Bar, he led the mission which authored an influential report in 2006 on the violations of international law in Moldova's separatist enclave of Transnistria which became a United Nations document and formed the basis for a resolution of the Government of Moldova adopting a plan of action to utilize the rule of law to resolve the Transnistrian crisis. He is also an elected member of the Atlantic Council. He has been co-chair of the New York State Bar Association's Committee on Public International Law since 2009.

Meyer is of German-Jewish heritage, both of his parents having fled that country in 1940 to New York. The lives of his paternal grandparents, who were murdered at Auschwitz in 1942, were recently the topic of an extensive history of the Holocaust in their native town of Gelsenkirchen, Germany.
