= Gura Caliței =

- Commune
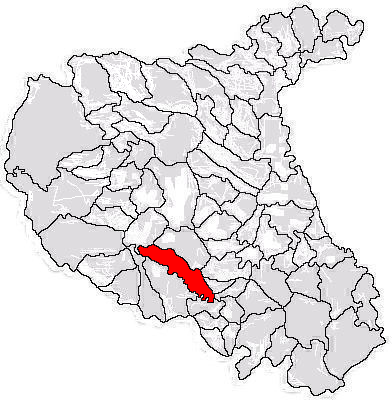
- Location in Vrancea County

- Location in Romania
- Coordinates: 45°35′N 27°1′E
- Country: Romania
- County: Vrancea

Government
  - Mayor (2024–2028): Gică Grosu (PNL)
- Area: 105 km^{2} (41 sq mi)
- Elevation: 167 m (548 ft)
- Population (2021-12-01): 2,558
  - Density: 24/km^{2} (63/sq mi)
- Time zone: EET/EEST (UTC+2/+3)
- Postal code: 627160
- Area code: +(40) 237
- Vehicle reg.: VN
- Website: www.gura-calitei.primarievn.ro

Gura Caliței is a commune located in Vrancea County, Romania. It is composed of ten villages: Bălănești, Cocoșari, Dealu Lung, Groapa Tufei, Gura Caliței, Lacu lui Baban, Plopu, Poenile, Rașca, and Șotârcari.

Romanian soldier Florinel Enache was born in Gura Caliței.

Historical population
Year	Pop.	±%
2002	3,117	—
2011	2,473	−20.7%
2021	2,558	+3.4%
Source: Census data
