= Găești =

- Town
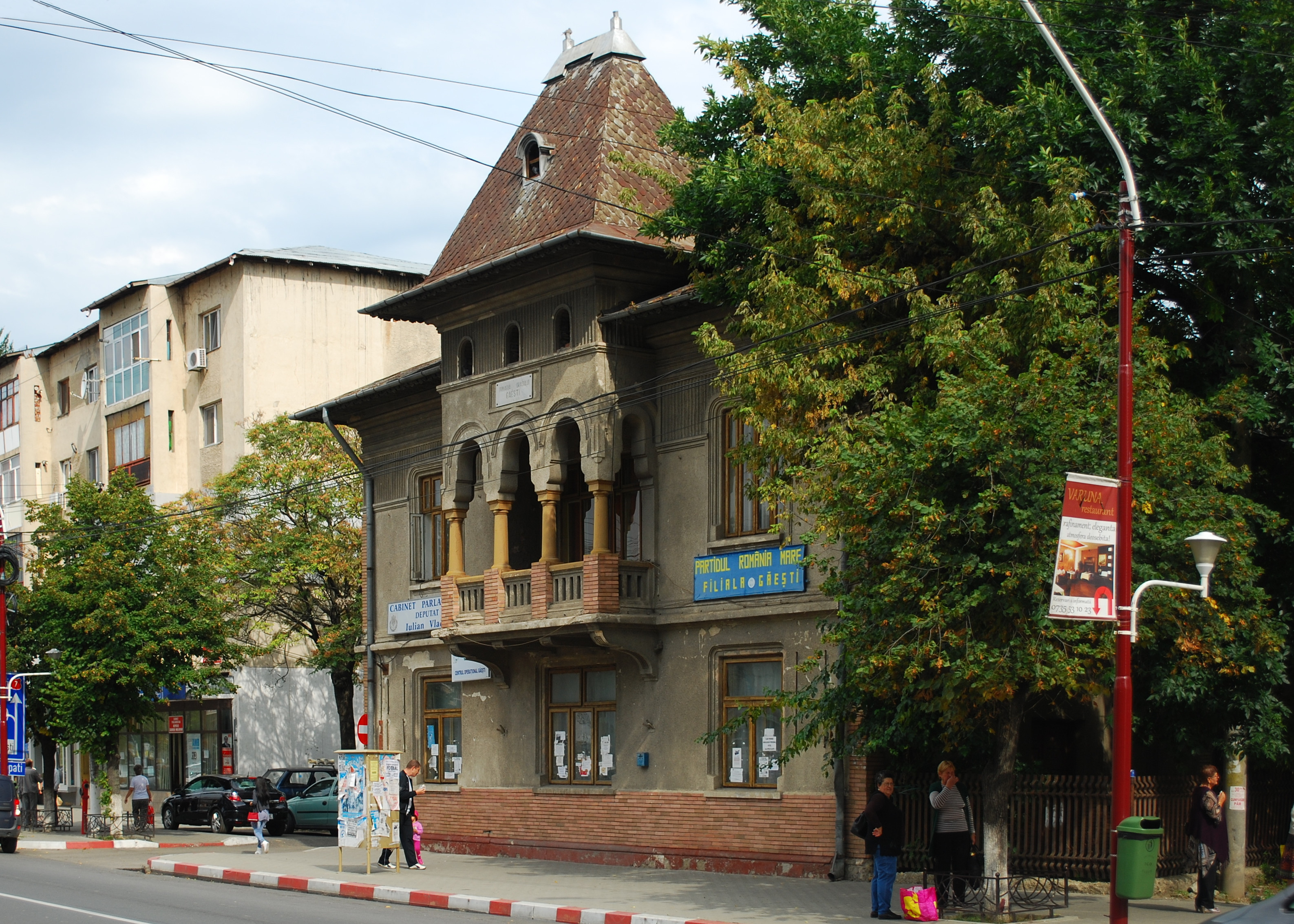
- Ciubuc House (former city hall)

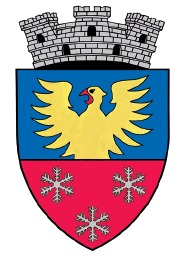
- Coat of arms

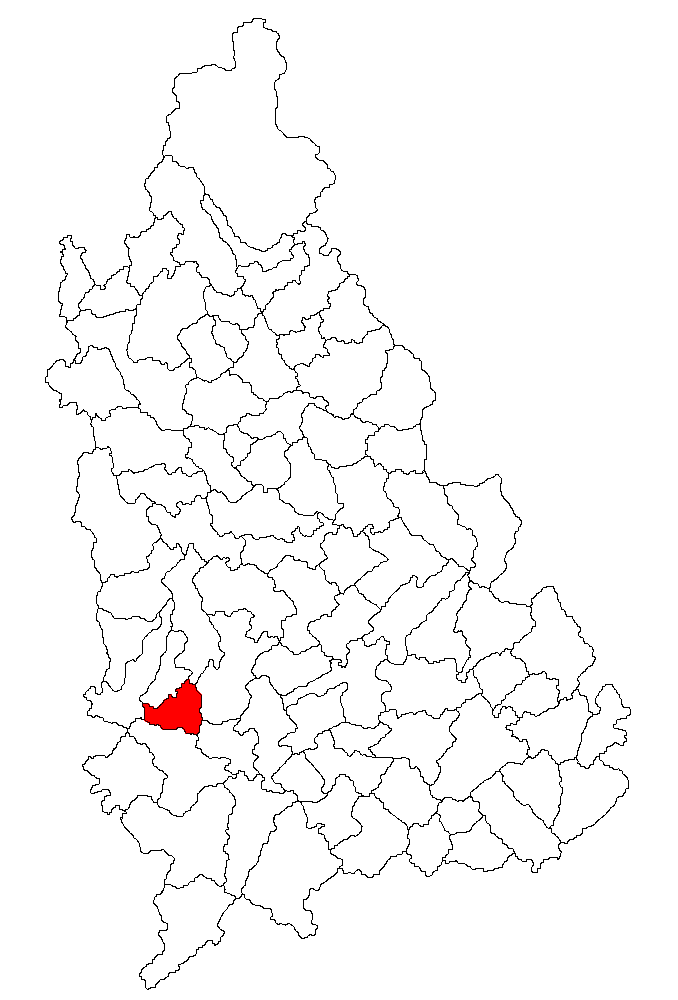
- Location in Dâmbovița County

- Location in Romania
- Coordinates: 44°43′10″N 25°19′11″E
- Country: Romania
- County: Dâmbovița

Government
  - Mayor (2024–2028): Grigore Gheorghe (PNL)
- Area: 22.8 km^{2} (8.8 sq mi)
- Elevation: 190 m (620 ft)
- Population (2021-12-01): 12,583
  - Density: 552/km^{2} (1,430/sq mi)
- Time zone: UTC+02:00 (EET)
  - Summer (DST): UTC+03:00 (EEST)
- Postal code: 135200
- Area code: (+40) 02 45
- Vehicle reg.: DB
- Website: www.primaria-gaesti.ro

Găești (Romanian pronunciation: [ɡəˈ(j)eʃtʲ]) is a town in Dâmbovița County, Muntenia, Romania with a population of 12,583 as of 2021.

== History ==
Historical population
Year	Pop.	±%
1912	3,990	—
1930	5,328	+33.5%
1948	7,726	+45.0%
1956	7,179	−7.1%
1966	8,962	+24.8%
1977	12,494	+39.4%
1992	18,566	+48.6%
2002	16,598	−10.6%
2011	13,317	−19.8%
2021	12,583	−5.5%
Source: Census data

The name of the town comes from a family of nobles (boyars) who owned most of the lands on which the town is now situated. Their name was Găești.

It was first mentioned on 19 July 1498 during the rule of Radu cel Mare, the son of Vlad Călugărul, who donated the land around Găești to the Monastery of Râncăciov. In 1807, most of the buildings of Găești were destroyed by a fire, then in 1812, it was hit by the plague.

== Demographics ==
At the 2021 census, Găești had a population of 12 583. At the census conducted in 2011, the town had 13,317 inhabitants, the majority of whom were Romanians (93.41%), with a minority of Roma (1.71%); for 4.68% of the population, the ethnicity was unknown. Most of the inhabitants are Orthodox (93.97%).

== Economy ==
Arctic S.A. company is headquartered in the town.

== Natives ==
- Victor Bădulescu (1892–1953), economist
- Florentin Cruceru (born 1981), footballer
- Paraschiva Iubu (1920–2011), architect
- Marius Martac (born 1991), footballer
- Viorel Pană (born 1967), general of the Romanian Air Force
- Vasile Pandelescu (1944–2004), accordion musician
- Călin Petrișor (born 1998), kickboxer
- Mihai Popescu (born 1985), handballer
- Cristian Ristea (born 1992), kickboxer
- Florin Tănase (born 1994), footballer
- Gheorghe Zamfir (born 1941), pan flute musician
