= National Order of Faithful Service =

National Order of Faithful Service Ordinul Național "Serviciul Credincios"
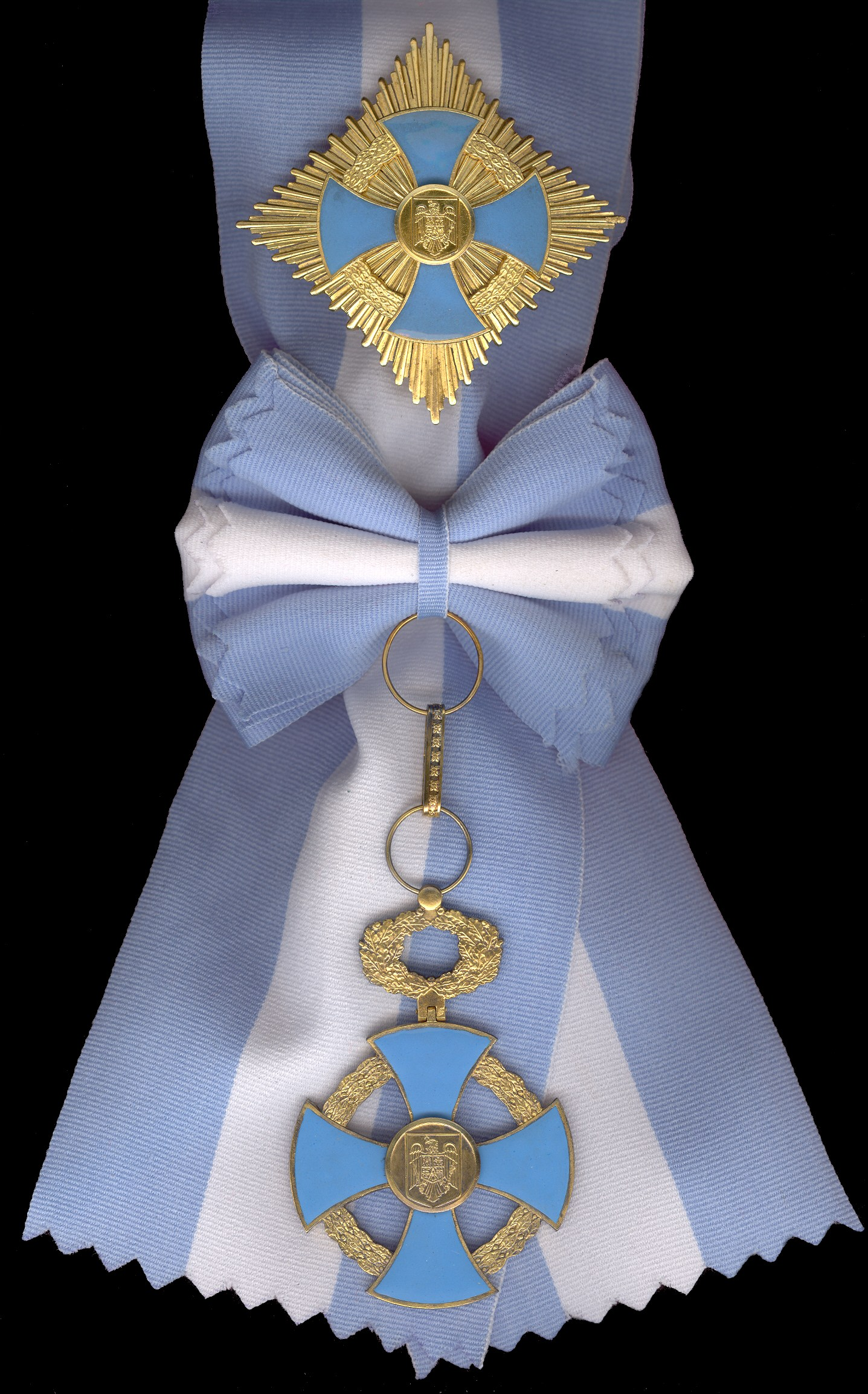
- Grand Cross of the Order

Awarded by The King of Romania (1932–1947) The President of Romania (since 2000)
- Type: Order of Merit
- Ribbon: Pale Blue with a White stripe in the middle.
- Eligibility: (1) Civil, military; (2) military units; (3) foreign citizens
- Awarded for: (1) Exceptional civil and military services to the Romanian State and the Romanian people; (2) For special acts in time of peace or for heroic acts in time of war; (3) For contributing to the development of the friendship relations with Romania, or for other exceptional services to the Romanian State and the Romanian People.
- Status: Currently awarded
- Grand Master: President Nicușor Dan
- Grades: Grand Cross; Grand Officer; Commander; Officer
- Former grades: Knight Grand Cross with Collar

Precedence
- Next (higher): Order of the Star of Romania
- Next (lower): Order For Merit
- Equivalent: Order of the Eagle of Romania
- Related: Cross of Faithful Service; Medal of Faithful Service
- The ribbon of the Order

The National Order of Faithful Service (Romanian: Ordinul Național "Serviciul Credincios") is the second highest national order of Romania after the Order of the Star of Romania, and the third highest State decoration, with the Order of Michael the Brave being the first. Originally it was established as the Medal of Faithful Service in 1878, during the reign of King Carol I. In 1906, the Cross of Faithful Service was added to the existing medal, as a superior class. During the reign of King Carol II, in 1932, the Order was established with four ranks: grand cross, grand officer, commodore, and officer.

Between 1940 and 1948, only the medal was awarded. It was discontinued by the communist authorities in 1948, along with all the other Romanian decorations. It was re-instituted on 31 March 2000, alongside the Cross and Medal of Faithful Service. It differs from the 1932 version in the number of ranks, an order of knight (the lowest) being added. Is awarded for special services to Romania. It is also awarded to foreign nationals.

== Ranks ==
The order is awarded in three classes (Civil, Military – Peacetime & Military – Wartime) and is composed of 5 levels:

- Grand Cross;
- Grand Officer;
- Commander;
- Officer;
- Knight.

There is also a National Cross of Faithful Service (Romanian: Crucea Națională "Serviciul Credincios") and a National Medal of Faithful Service (Romanian: Medalia Națională "Serviciul Credincios").

== Insignia ==
The ribbon (for civilians and peacetime military) of the order is nowadays light blue with a white central stripe:

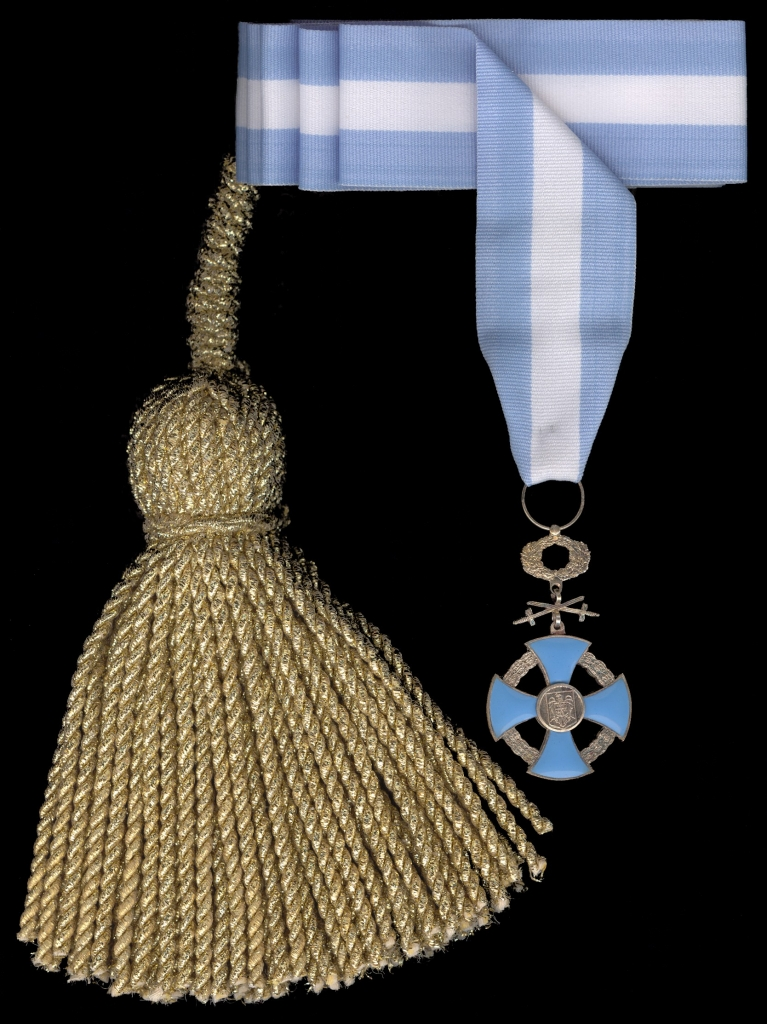
Peacetime military flag decoration - 2000

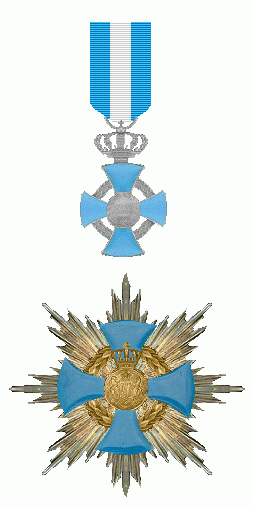
Lower rank decoration and upper rank star - 1932 model

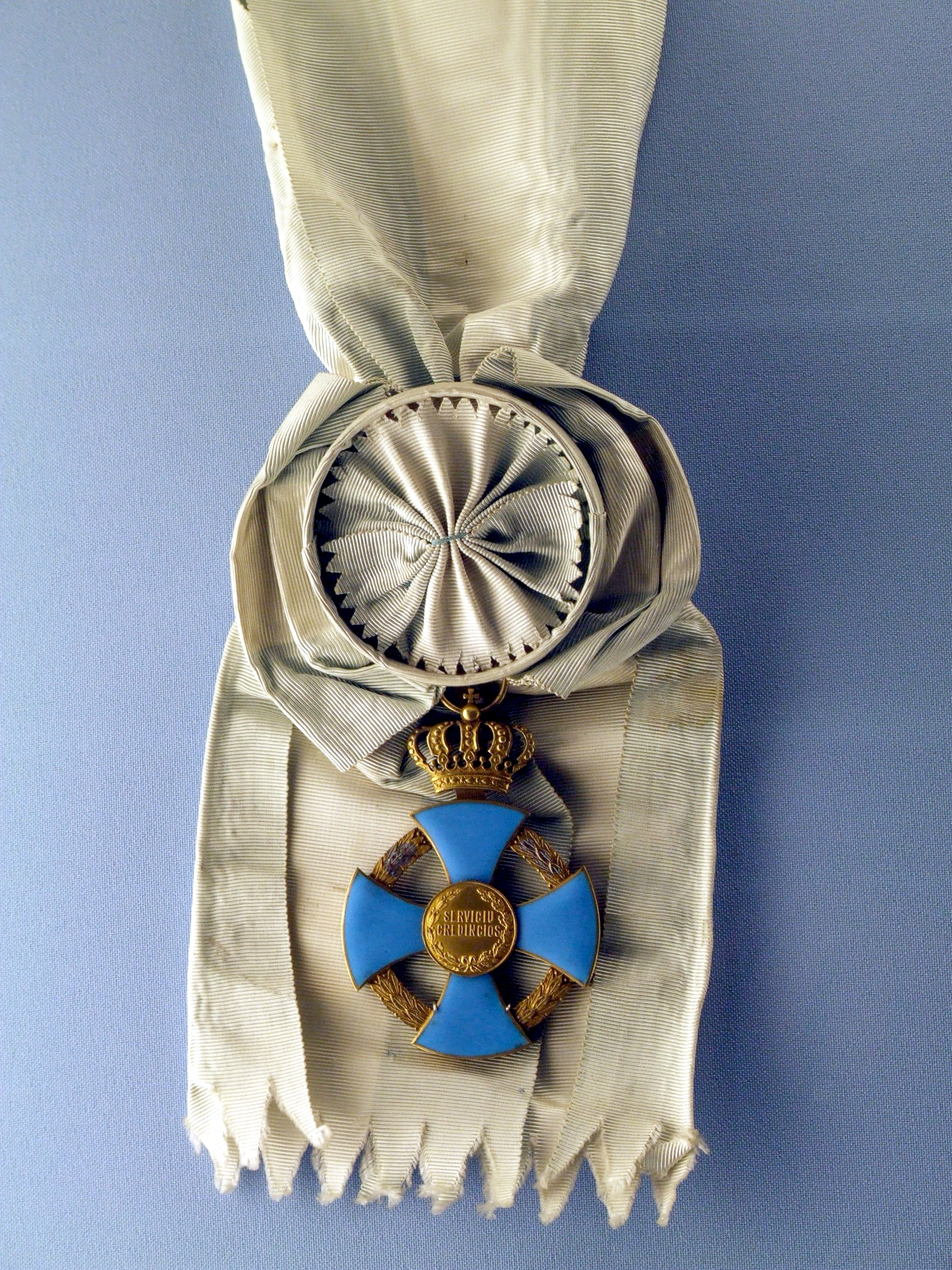
Grand Cross - 1932 model

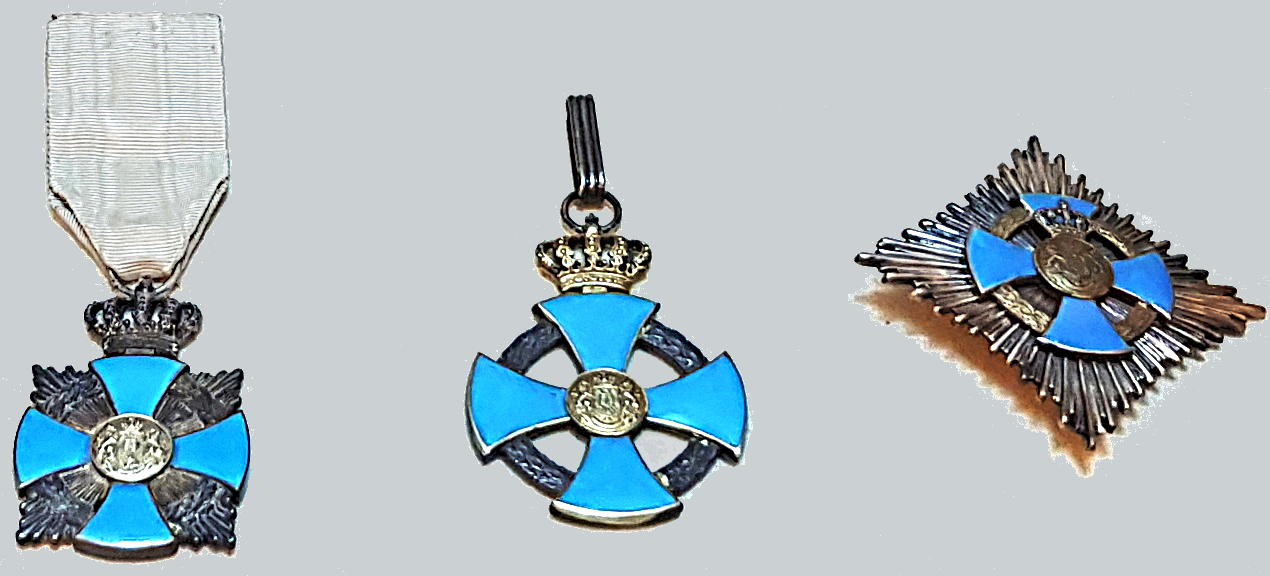
Lower ranks - 1932 model

== Notable recipients ==
- King Michael I of Romania with collar and diamonds as final sovereign of the order during the Kingdom of Romania
- Douglas MacArthur (Grand Cross, 1932)
- Princess Madeleine, Duchess of Hälsingland and Gästrikland (2008)
- Prince Carl Philip, Duke of Värmland (2008)
- Radu Câmpeanu, rank of "Knight" (2002)
- Alexandrina Cernov
- Iancu Țucărman
- Martha Argerich (2025)

=== Military units decorated with the Order ===
- Michael the Brave 30th Guards Brigade (2015)
- 101st Airborne Division (2023)
