= Medal for Merit (Romania) =

National Medal For Merit Medalia națională "Pentru Merit"
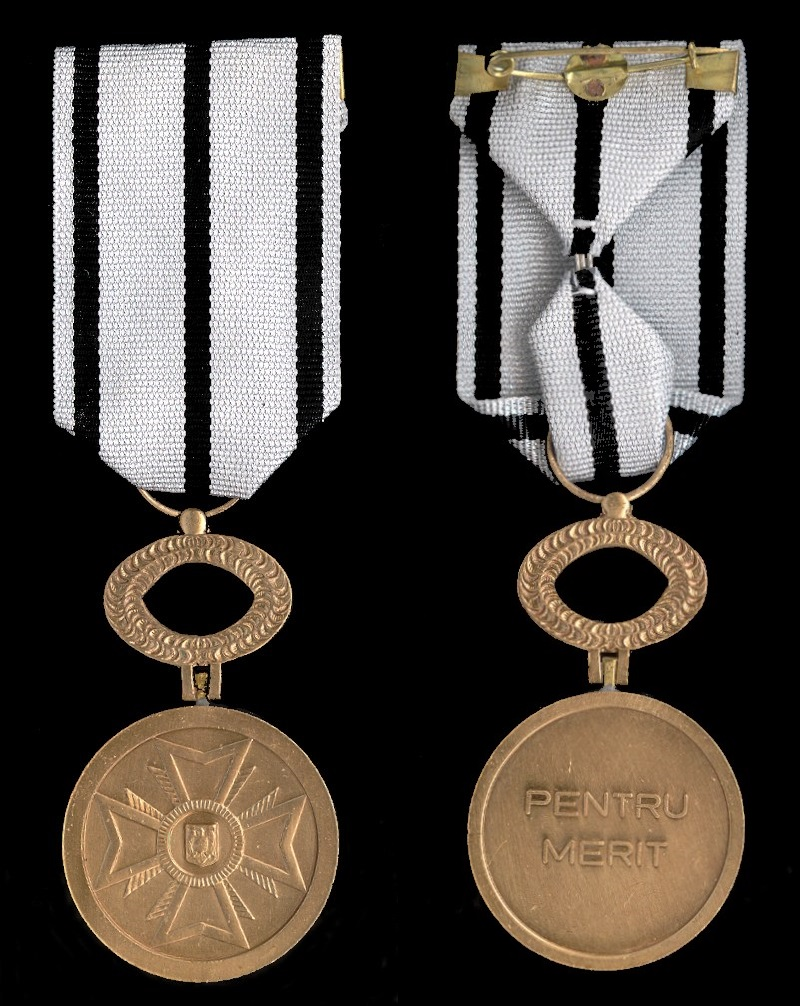
- Third class National Medal for Merit, civil division.
- Type: Three grade medal, with three divisions (civil, military, wartime)
- Awarded for: Important services rendered in the interests of Romania.
- Country: Romania
- Presented by: The President of Romania (since 2000)
- Eligibility: Romanian and foreign civilians and military personnel
- Status: Currently awarded
- Established: 2000
- Ribbon bar of the National Medal for Merit

Precedence
- Next (higher): Medal of Faithful Service
- Next (lower): Order of the Victory of the Romanian Revolution of December 1989
- Related: National Order for Merit

The National Medal For Merit (Romanian: Medalia națională "Pentru Merit") is a state decoration which is part of the National System of Decorations of Romania. It is the sixth highest honour awarded by Romania ranking just behind the Medal of Faithful Service and ahead of the Order of the Victory of the Romanian Revolution of December 1989.

== Criteria and composition ==
The National Medal for Merit may be awarded to recognise important services rendered to Romania during peace or war. It is equivalent in importance and is awarded for similar achievements as the National Order for Merit, but is granted to those who lack higher education. The medal is limited to 7,200 living recipients across the first and second classes. There is no limit on the number of third class medals. Awards are limited by grade and division as follows:

- First Class medal, 2,000 civilian and 400 military
- Second Class medal, 4,000 civilian and 800 military
- Third Class medal, no limits
