= Stoian Stelian =

Romanian diplomat

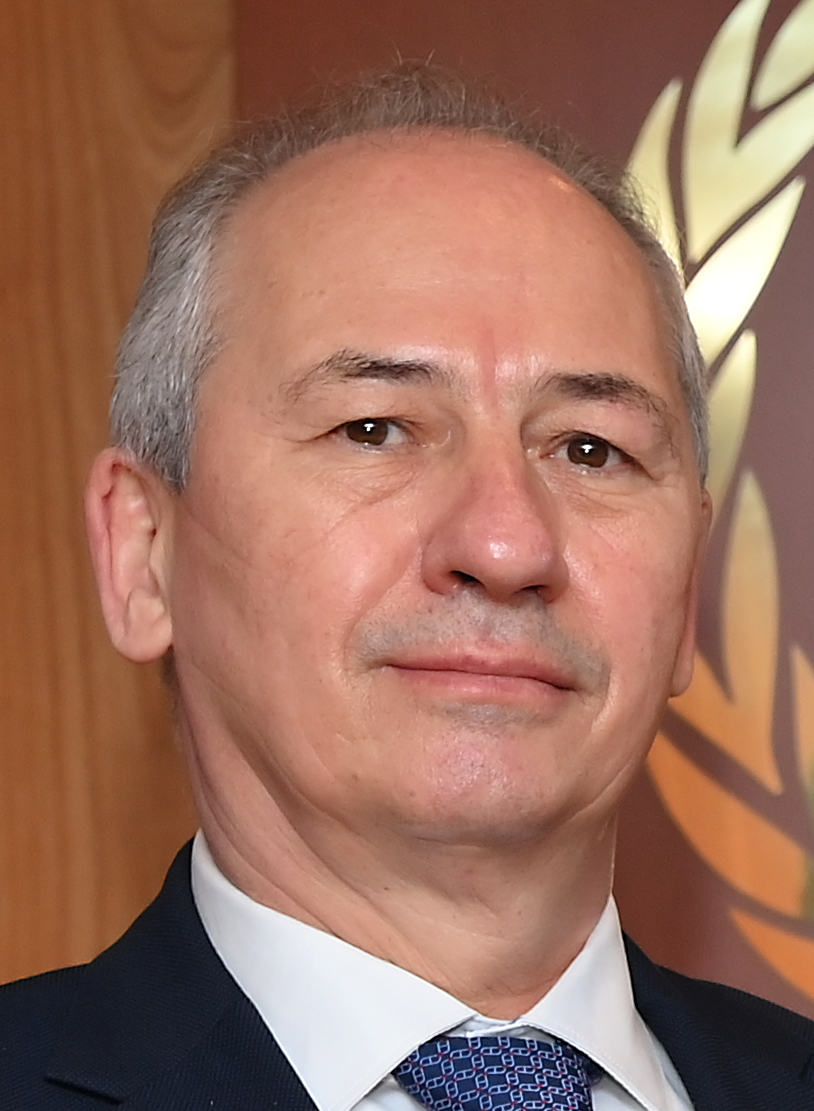
Stelian Stoian in 2022

Stoian Stelian (born 1 February 1965) is a Romanian diplomat and is currently the Permanent Representative of Romania to NATO. Previously he has been the Permanent Representative of Romania to the Council of Europe

== Honours and awards ==
- The National Order "Pentru Merit", in rank of knight - 2003
- "Meritul Diplomatic", in rank of officer – 2007
- "Diplomat of the year - 2012" and citations for the outstanding work and achievements as DCM in 2002 and 2003
- Certificate of appreciation, awarded by the Assistant Secretary of State for European and Eurasian Affairs, US Department of State – March 2004.
