= Orders, decorations, and medals of Romania =

The National Decorations System of Romania (Romanian: Sistemul Național de Decorații) is divided into six categories, listed below. It was re-established in 1998 after a 50-year period in which Romania used a Soviet-style system of decorations. It is very similar to the system used in Romania during the interwar period.

The list is ordered in descending order of the awards' rank in the National System of Decorations.

== The system ==
Shortly after the change of regime in December 1989, the attributions related to the establishment and conferring of the decorations were to be assumed, by Decree-Law no. 2/1989. The situation would however remain unchanged until the 1991 Constitution.

=== National decorations ===
1. Ordinul Steaua României - Order of the Star of Romania
2. Ordinul național "Serviciul Credincios" - National Order of Faithful Service;
3. Ordinul național "Pentru Merit" - National Order of Merit;
4. Crucea națională "Serviciul Credincios" - National Cross of Faithful Service;
5. Medalia națională "Serviciul Credincios" - National Medal of Faithful Service;
6. Medalia națională "Pentru Merit" - National Medal For Merit.

=== Commemorative decorations ===
1. Ordinul "Victoria Revoluției Române din Decembrie 1989" – (Order Victory of the Romanian Revolution of December 1989);
2. Crucea Comemorativa a celui de-al doilea Război Mondial, 1941-1945 – (Commemorative Cross of the Second World War, 1941–1945);
3. Crucea Comemorativa a Rezistenței Anticomuniste – (Commemorative Cross of the Anti-communist Resistance);
4. Medalia Comemorativă "150 de ani de la nașterea lui Mihai Eminescu" – (Commemorative Medal "150 Years from the birth of Mihai Eminescu").

=== Peacetime military decorations ===
1. Ordinul "Virtutea Militară" – (The Order "The Military Virtue");
2. Ordinul "Virtutea Aeronautică" – (The Order "The Aeronautical Virtue");
3. Ordinul "Virtutea Maritimă" – (The Order "The Matitime Virtue");
4. Ordinul "Bărbăție și Credință" – (The Order "Valour and Faith");
5. Medalia "Virtutea Militară" – (The Medal "The Military Virtue");
6. Medalia "Virtutea Aeronautică" – (The Medal "The Aeronautical Virtue");
7. Medalia "Virtutea Maritimă" – (The Medal "The Matitime Virtue");
8. Medalia "Bărbăție și Credință" – (The Medal "Valour and Faith").

=== Civil decorations on domains of activity ===
1. Ordinul "Meritul Agricol" – (The Order "The Agricultural Merit");
2. Ordinul "Meritul Cultural" – (The Order "The Cultural Merit");
3. Ordinul "Meritul Diplomatic" – (The Order "The Diplomatic Merit");
4. Ordinul "Meritul Industrial şi Comercial" – (The Order "The Industrial and Commercial Merit");
5. Ordinul "Meritul pentru Învățământ" – (The Order "Merit for the Education");
6. Ordinul "Meritul Sanitar" – (The Order "The Sanitary Merit");
7. Ordinul "Meritul Sportiv" – (The Order "The Sports Merit");
8. Medalia "Meritul Agricol" – (The Medal "The Agricultural Merit");
9. Medalia "Meritul Cultural" – (The Medal "The Cultural Merit");
10. Medalia "Meritul Diplomatic" – (The Medal "The Diplomatic Merit");
11. Medalia "Meritul Industrial şi Comercial" – (The Medal "The industrial and Commercial Merit");
12. Medalia "Meritul pentru Învățământ" – (The Medal "Merit for the Education");
13. Medalia "Meritul Sanitar" – (The Medal "The Sanitary Merit");
14. Medalia "Meritul Sportiv" – (The Medal "The Sports Merit")

=== Wartime military decorations ===
1. Ordinul "Mihai Viteazul" – (The Order "Mihai Viteazul");
2. Ordinul național "Steaua României" – (Order of the Star of Romania);
3. Ordinul național "Serviciul Credincios" – (National Order of Faithful Service);
4. Ordinul național "Pentru Merit" – (National Order "For Merit");
5. Crucea națională "Serviciul Credincios" – (National Cross "Faithful Service");
6. Medalia națională "Serviciul Credincios" – (National Medal "Faithful Service");
7. Medalia națională "Pentru Merit" – (National Medal "For Merit");
8. Ordinul "Virtutea Militară" – (The Order "The Military Virtue");
9. Ordinul "Virtutea Aeronautică" – (The Order "The Aeronautical Virtue");
10. Ordinul "Virtutea Maritimă" – (The Order "The Maritime Virtue");
11. Ordinul "Bărbăție și Credință" – (The Order "Valour and Faith");
12. Ordinul "Meritul Sanitar" – (The Order "Sanitary Merit");
13. Medalia "Virtutea Militară" – (The Medal "The Military Virtue");
14. Medalia "Virtutea Aeronautică" – (The Medal "The Aeronautical Virtue");
15. Medalia "Virtutea Maritimă" – (The Medal "The Maritime Virtue");
16. Medalia "Bărbăție și Credință" – (The Medal "Valour and Faith");
17. Medalia "Meritul Sanitar" – (The Medal "The Sanitary Merit").

=== Honorific signs ===
1. Honorific Sign "The Eagle of Romania";
2. Honorific Sign "The Reward for the Work in the Public Service";
3. Honorific Sign "In the Service of the Country" for officers and special statute public functionaries;
4. Honorific Sign "In the Service of the Country" for warrant officers and special statute public functionaries.

== Community medals ==
=== Romanian Jewish community ===
- Alexandru Șafran Medal
- Wilhelm Filderman Medal
- Romanian Dedication Medal

== Kingdom of Romania ==
=== Orders ===
==== Order of Michael the Brave ====
See Order of Michael the Brave

==== Order of Carol I ====
See Order of Carol I

==== Order of the Star of Romania ====
See Order of the Star of Romania

==== Order of the Crown ====
See Order of the Crown

==== Order of Ferdinand I ====
Order of Ferdinand I Ordinul Ferdinand I
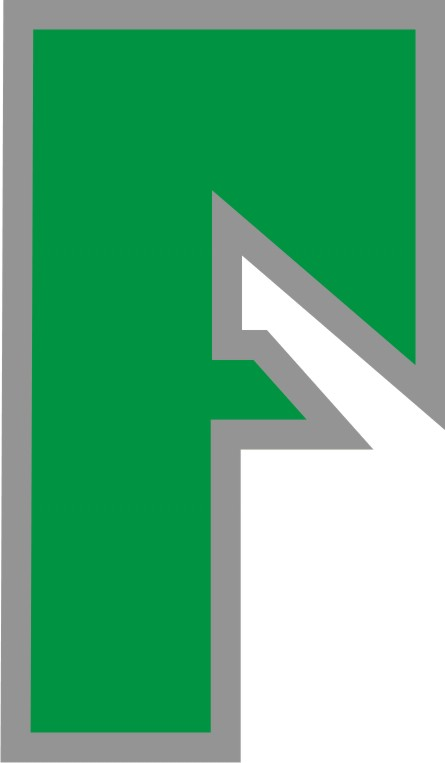
- Emblem of the Order

Awarded by King of Romania
- Type: State decoration
- Religious affiliation: Romanian Orthodox
- Ribbon: Navy Blue with a Gold stripe in the middle and a thin Red stripe between the Gold.
- Eligibility: Exclusively for Romanian citizens only.
- Awarded for: (1) Outstanding contributions to the Union of Transylvania with Romania; (2) National activity or Military deeds contributing to the union of all Romanians; (3) Meritorious service to the nation.
- Status: 18 February 1937 (Dormant); Abolished
- Sovereign: King Michael I of Romania
- Grades: Knight Grand Cross with Collar; Knight/Dame Grand Cross; Knight/Dame Grand Officer; Knight/Dame Commander; Knight/Dame Officer; Knight/Dame

Precedence
- Next (higher): Order of the Crown
- Next (lower): Royal Order for Merit
- The Ribbon of the Order

The Order of Ferdinand I (Romanian: Ordinul Ferdinand I) was instituted on 10 May 1929 by the Regency of King Michael I, then a minor, in memory of the late King Ferdinand I. It was created to reward those who contributed to the building of The Greater Romania. The Order was the fifth highest ranking of the Romanian Decorations of the Kingdom of Romania until the abolition of the monarchy in 1947. The Order was not reinstated as a Dynastic Order by the Romanian Royal Family as they had done with two other Orders.

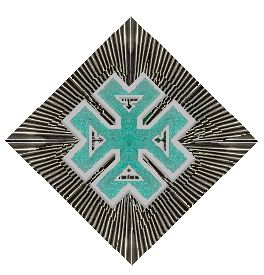
Star of the Order

During its time as a National Order it was widely awarded to members of the Romanian Royal Family, Romanian Prime Ministers, Romanian politicians, people who contributed to the union of all Romanians through national activity or military deeds, those who would have contributed extraordinary merits to the country in the future, and those thought to be worthy of receiving the order by the King of Romania.

With the death of the former King Michael I, there are currently no living members of the Order.

===== Grades =====
- Grand Cross with Collar – Limited to 8 Knights
- Grand Cross – Limited to 15 Knights/Dames
- Grand Officer – Limited to 40 Knights/Dames
- Commander – Limited to 60 Knights/Dames
- Officer – Limited to 75 Knights/Dames
- Knight/Dame – Limited to 100 Knights/Dames
Insignia of the Order

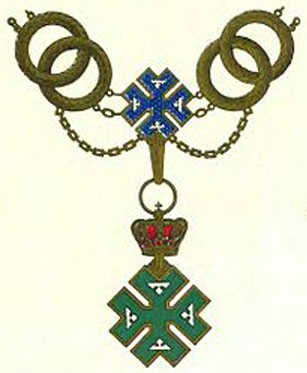
Bottom of the Collar of the Order

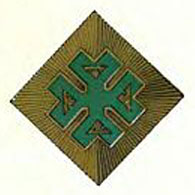
Star of the Order

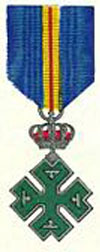
Officer's or Knight/Dames Medal of the Order

==== Order for Merit ====
See Order for Merit

==== Romanian House Order of Hohenzollern ====
See House Order of Hohenzollern

==== Order of Bene Merenti of the Royal House ====
Order of Bene Merenti of the Royal House Ordinul Bene Merenti al Casei Domnitoare
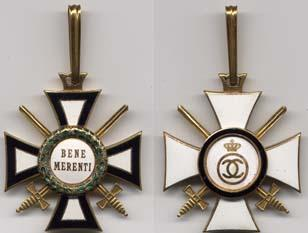
- Officer Badges of the Order

Awarded by King of Romania
- Type: State decoration
- Religious affiliation: Romanian Orthodox
- Ribbon: Silver with a thin black stripe in the middle and either side
- Eligibility: (1) Civil, Military; (2) Foreign Citizens
- Awarded for: (1) Achievements in the fields of Culture, Science, Industry, Agriculture and Services to the King; (2) Services to the King
- Status: Abolished on 8 September 1940
- Sovereign: King Michael I of Romania
- Grades: Knight/Dame Commander; Knight/Dame Officer; Knight/Dame; Medal

Precedence
- Next (higher): Romanian Order of the House of Hohenzollern
- Next (lower): Order of Agricultural Merit
- Equivalent: Order of St. George
- Related: House Order of Hohenzollern
- The Ribbon of the Order

The Order of Bene Merenti of the Royal House (Romanian: Ordinul Bene Merenti al Casei Domnitoare) was instituted as a Decoration on 20 February 1876 by Prince Carol I (later King Carol I of the Kingdom of Romania) during his tenth year of reign as Domnitor or Sovereign Prince of the United Principalities of Romania. The Decoration was changed into an Order on 16 December 1915 by King Carol I's nephew King Ferdinand I of Romania. On 8 September 1940, the Order was abolished and replaced with the Order of St. George by King Ferdinand I's grandson King Michael I.

===== Decoration =====
The Order, previously a Decoration Medal known as the Decoration of Bene Merenti of the Royal House, was based as a separate Romanian version of the House Order of Hohenzollern of the House of Hohenzollern to which Prince Carol I belonged.

Although intended to honour Civilians, military figures, and foreigners with achievements in the fields of Culture, Science, Industry, Agriculture and also Services to the King, the Decoration was rarely bestowed.

The Decoration was in two types:

- The Royal Medal – Consisted of three classes of Gold, Silver and Bronze with no specifications.
- The Life Saving Medal – Consisted of three classes of Silver Gilt, Silver and Bronze with the purposes of rewarding acts of courage and devotion of those who, at risk of life, saved or attempted to save the life of a person or private or public property.

===== Order =====
The Decoration was transformed into an Order under the reign of King Carol I's nephew King Ferdinand I on 16 December 1915.

On 8 September 1940, the Order was abolished and replaced by the Order of St. George under the reign of King Ferdinand I's grandson King Michael I.

===== Grades =====
- Commander or 1st Class
- Officer or 2nd Class
- Knight/Dame or 3rd Class
- Medal
Badge types of the order

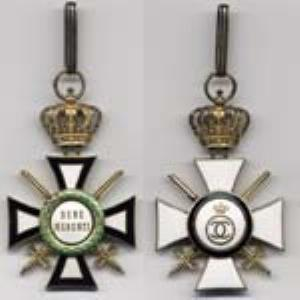
Commander or 1st Class Badge

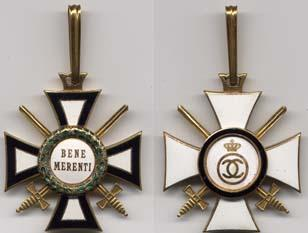
Officer or 2nd Class Badge

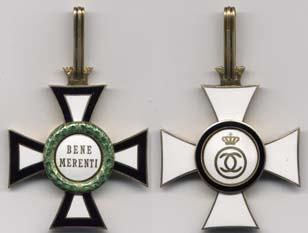
Knight/Dame or 3rd Class Badge

==== Order of St. George ====
Order of Saint George Ordinul Sfântul Gheorghe

Awarded by King of Romania
- Type: State decoration
- Religious affiliation: Romanian Orthodox
- Ribbon: Navy Blue with thin Yellow stripes on the sides.
- Eligibility: Military
- Awarded for: Achievements of Service in time of war.
- Status: Abolished in 1947
- Sovereign: King Michael I of Romania
- Grades: Knight Grand Cross with Collar; Knight Grand Cross; Knight Grand Officer; Knight Commander; Knight Officer; Knight

Precedence
- Next (higher): Romanian House Order of Hohenzollern
- Next (lower): Order of Agricultural Merit
- Equivalent: Order of Bene Merenti of the Royal House
- The Ribbon of the Order

===== Order =====
The Order was instituted by King Michael I of Romania on 15 September 1940, 9 days after his second accession as King of Romania. The Order replaced the Order of Bene Merenti of the Royal House.

The Order was the second highest Military award after the Order of Michael the Brave and was intended for Military figures who attained "Achievements of Service in time of war." However, the Order was never awarded.

The Order was abolished during the abolition of the Romanian Monarchy in 1947 and was not reinstated as a Dynastic Order of the Decorations of the Romanian Royal House by Former King Michael I.

===== Grades =====
- Knight Grand Cross with Collar
- Knight Grand Cross
- Knight Grand Officer
- Knight Commander
- Knight Officer
- Knight

==== Order of Agricultural Merit ====
Order of Agricultural Merit Ordinul Meritul Agricol
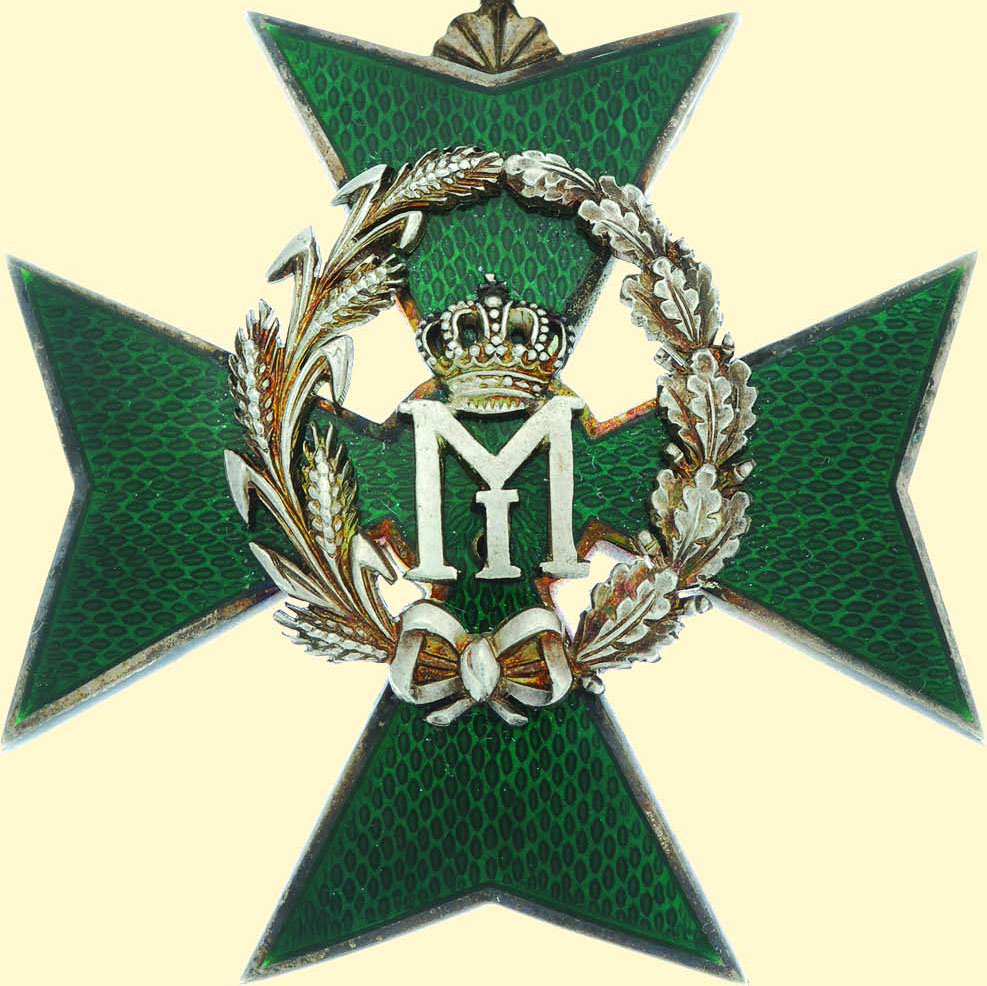
- Star of the Order

Awarded by King of Romania
- Type: State decoration
- Religious affiliation: Romanian Orthodox
- Ribbon: Green with a Gold stripe in the Middle.
- Eligibility: Romanian and Foreign Citizens
- Awarded for: Outstanding contributions to Agriculture.
- Status: Abolished in 1947
- Sovereign: King Michael I of Romania
- Grades: Sovereign Knight Grand Officer; Knight/Dame Commander; Knight/Dame Officer; Knight/Dame; Medals

Precedence
- Next (higher): Order of St. George
- Next (lower): Order of Faithful Service
- Related: Decorations of Culture
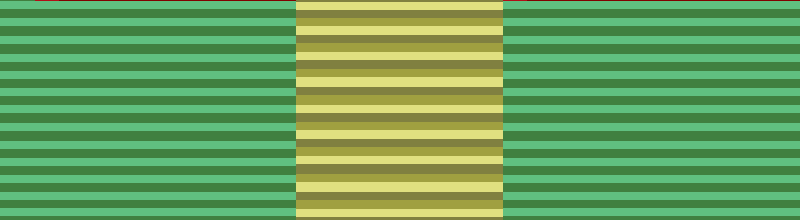
- The Ribbon of the Order

The Order was established with the intention of awarding Romanian and Foreign Civilians who made "Outstanding contributions to Agriculture," especially after the Great Depression in Romania from which the country was steadily recovering.

The Order was abolished during the abolition of the Romanian Monarchy in 1947.

The Order was reinstated during the Socialist Republic of Romania (see Socialist Order of Agriculture) and abolished after the Romanian Revolution.

On 31 March 2000, the Order was reinstated again (see Republican Order of Agriculture).

==== Order of Faithful Service ====
See Order of Faithful Service

==== Order of Military Virtue ====
See Order of Military Virtue

==== Order of Aeronautical Virtue ====
Royal Order of Aeronautical Virtue Ordinul Regal Virtutea Aeronautică
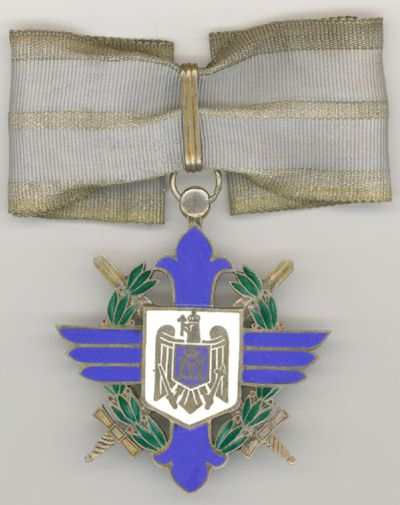
- Commander's Necklet of the Order

Awarded by King of Romania
- Type: Military Decoration
- Religious affiliation: Romanian Orthodox
- Ribbon: Pale Blue with thin White Gold stripes on either side and in the middle
- Eligibility: (1) Civil, Military; (2) Members of the Royal Romanian Air Force and Air Cadets.
- Awarded for: (1) Acts of Bravery or Valour in the air; (2) Achievements in Aviation.
- Status: Abolished in 1947
- Sovereign: King Michael I of Romania
- Chancellor: Chief of the Romanian Royal Air Force
- Grades: Knight Commander; Knight Officer; Knight; Medal

Precedence
- Next (higher): Royal Order of Faithful Service −
- Next (lower): Order of the Cross of Queen Marie
- Equivalent: Royal Order of Military Virtue
- The Ribbon of the Order

===== Order =====
The Order was established on 31 July 1930 by Carol II as the fourth highest Military Award after the Order of Michael the Brave and the Order of St. George

The Order was intended to award Civilian and Military air personnel, as well as Members of the Royal Romanian Air Force and Air Cadets in times of Peace and War.

The Order was abolished during the abolition of the Romanian Monarchy in 1947.

On 31 March 2000, the Order was re-established, See Republican Order of Aeronautical Virtue.

===== Grades =====
- Commander or 1st Class
- Officer or 2nd Class
- Knight or 3rd Class
- Medal

===== Insignia =====
The badge of the Order was based on the same design as the Order of Michael the Brave, but contains a small shield of the Lesser Coat of arms of Romania in the middle of the badge.

Medals of the Order

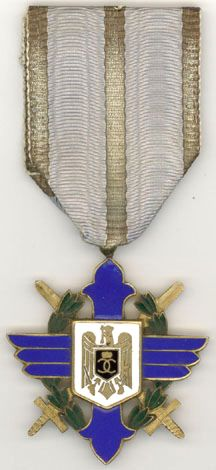
Officer or 1st Class Medal

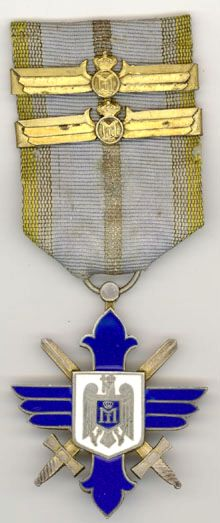
Knight or 2nd Class Medal

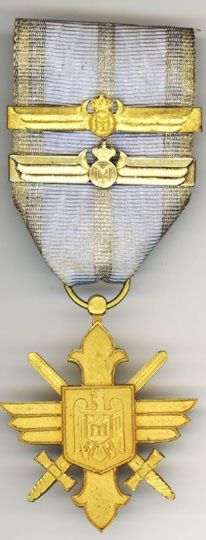
Medal

==== Order of the Cross of Queen Marie ====
Order of the Cross of Queen Marie Ordinul Crucea Regina Maria
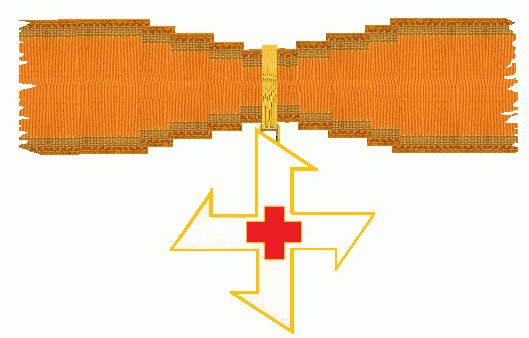
- Commander's Necklet of the Order.

Awarded by King of Romania
- Type: Military Decoration
- Religious affiliation: Romanian Orthodox
- Eligibility: Civil, Military.
- Awarded for: Merit in Medical work in Wars and in Peacetime.
- Status: Abolished in 1947
- Sovereign: King Michael I of Romania
- Chancellor: Chief of the Romanian Royal Air Force
- Grades: Knight Commander; Knight Officer; Knight; Medal

Precedence
- Next (higher): Royal Order of Military Virtue; Royal Order of Aeronautical Virtue
- Next (lower): Royal Order of the Eagle of Romania
- The Ribbon of the Order

The Order of the Cross of Marie (Romanian: Ordinul Crucea Regina Maria) was instituted on 15 February 1917 by King Ferdinand I of Romania as the fifth and lowest Military Award for Grand Mastership of his wife Princess Marie of Saxe-Coburg and Gotha and Edinburgh, who was a Nurse in Military hospitals as well as led The Romanian Red Cross in World War I.

The Order was established to award Civil and Military Personnel of Merit in Medical work in Wars and in Peacetime working in the same field as Queen Marie.

The Order was abolished during the abolition of the Romanian Monarchy in 1947 and was not reinstated as a Dynastic Order of the Decorations of the Romanian Royal House by Former King Michael I.

===== Grades =====
- Commander or 1st Class
- Officer or 2nd Class
- Knight or 3rd Class

===== Recipients =====
====== Knight Commanders ======
- Queen Marie
- Princess Ileana
- King Michael I

====== Knight Officers ======
- Prince Nicholas

==== Order of the Eagle of Romania ====
See Order of the Eagle of Romania

=== Decorations ===
==== Decoration of the Cross of Queen Elisabeth ====
Decoration of the Cross of Queen Elisabeth Decoratia Crucea Regina Elisabeta

Awarded by King of Romania
- Type: State decoration
- Religious affiliation: Romanian Orthodox
- Ribbon: Pale Blue with thin Gold stripes on the end of either side.
- Eligibility: Exclusively for Romanian women only.
- Awarded for: Outstanding contributions or services to the wounded, sick, ambulances and hospitals.
- Status: Abolished in 1947
- Sovereign: King Michael I of Romania
- Grades: Dame

Precedence
- Next (higher): Royal Order of the Eagle of Romania
- Next (lower): Decoration of the Cross of Sanitary Merit
- The Ribbon of the Decoration

The Decoration of the Cross of Queen Elisabeth (Romanian: Decorația Crucea Regina Elisabeta) was a Decoration established by Prince Carol I of Romania by Royal Decree 2270 on 6 October 1878 for his wife, Princess Elisabeth of Wied, to award Romanian women she deemed to have achieved outstanding service for caring for the wounded and sick, whether directly in ambulances and hospital campaigns, or indirectly through donations or other actions.

The Decoration was abolished during the abolition of the Romanian Monarchy in 1947 and was not reinstated as a Dynastic Decoration of the Decorations of the Romanian Royal House by Former King Michael I.

==== Decoration of the Cross of Sanitary Merit ====
Decoration of the Cross of Sanitary Merit Decorația Crucea Meritul Sanitar

Awarded by King of Romania
- Type: Chivalric state Decoration
- Religious affiliation: Romanian Orthodox
- Ribbon: White with thin Red lines at either side.
- Eligibility: Civil, Military
- Awarded for: Outstanding Donors, Writers or other acts and work that contributes to improving the health status of the country.
- Status: Abolished in 1947
- Sovereign: King Michael I of Romania
- Grades: Knight/Dame; Member

Precedence
- Next (higher): Decoration of the Cross of Queen Elisabeth
- Next (lower): Decoration of the Cross of The Danube
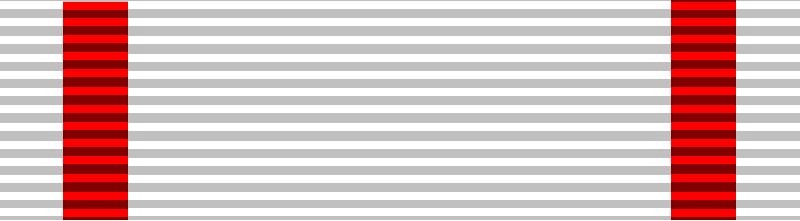
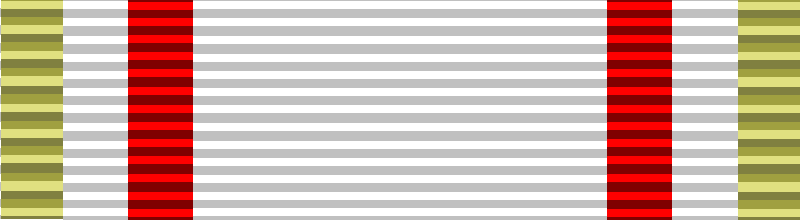
- Peacetime Wartime; The Ribbons of the Decoration

The Decoration of the Cross of Sanitary Merit (Romanian: Decorația Crucea Meritul Sanitar) was a Decoration established by King Carol I of Romania by Royal Decree 6471 on 25 November 1913 for his wife, Princess Elisabeth of Wied, to award Romanian men, women, and organisations deemed to be working outstandingly to improve the health status of the country.

The Decoration was abolished during the abolition of the Romanian Monarchy in 1947 and was not reinstated as a Dynastic Decoration of the Decorations of the Romanian Royal House by Former King Michael I.

==== Decoration of the Cross of The Danube ====
Crossing of the Danube Cross Crucea Trecerea Dunării

Awarded by King of Romania
- Type: Chivalric state Decoration
- Religious affiliation: Romanian Orthodox
- Ribbon: Bright Red and Black.
- Eligibility: Civil, Military
- Awarded for: Outstanding leadership and contributions in the Romanian War of Independence
- Status: Abolished in 1947
- Sovereign: King Michael I of Romania
- Grades: Knight; Member

Precedence
- Next (higher): Decoration of the Cross of Sanitary Merit
- Civil Military; The Ribbons of the Decoration

The Crossing of the Danube Cross (Romanian: Crucea Trecerea Dunării) was a Decoration established by Prince Carol I of Romania by Royal Decree 617 on 23 March 1878 to award individuals for outstanding leadership and contributions in the Romanian War of Independence.

The Decoration was later awarded to very few individuals who were deemed to have proven great leadership.

The Decoration was named after the Danube River where the Romanian Army fought the Ottoman Imperial Army.

The Decoration was abolished during the abolition of the Romanian Monarchy in 1947 and was not reinstated as a Dynastic Decoration of the Decorations of the Romanian Royal House by Former King Michael I.

== Socialist Republic of Romania ==
- Hero of the Socialist Republic of Romania
- Hero of Socialist Labour of Romania
- Hero of the New Agrarian Revolution
- Order of the Mother-Heroine
- Order of Victory of Socialism
- Order of the Star of the Romanian Socialist Republic
- Order of the "August 23"
- Tudor Vladimirescu Order
- Order "Defense of the Fatherland"
- Order "For outstanding achievements in the protection of the state and social system"
- Order "For Service to the Socialist Homeland"
- Order of Labour
- "Order of Merit for Agriculture"
- Order "For Scientific Achievements"
- Order of Cultural Merit
- Order "For Merit Medical"
- Order of Sporting Merit
- Order "For Military Merit"
- Order of Parental Glory

== See also ==
- Romanian decorations (disambiguation)
- Decorations of the Romanian Royal House
