= National Order of Merit (Romania) =

Order of Romania

National Order of Merit Ordinul Național Pentru Merit
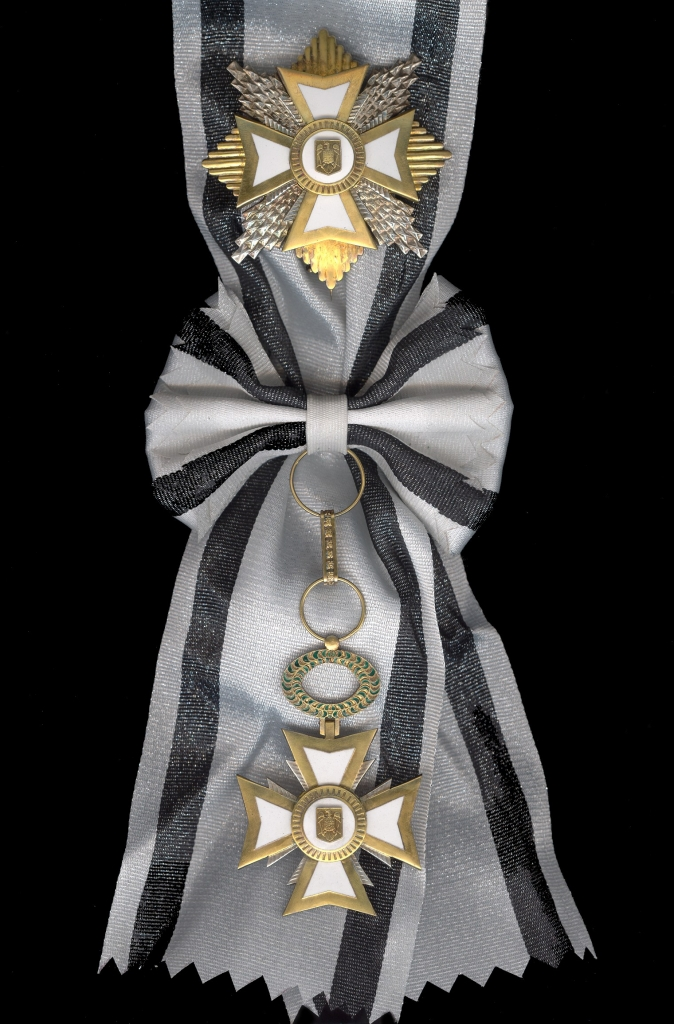
- Grand Cross of the OrderKnight's Medal of the Order

Awarded by The President of Romania (since 2000)
- Type: Order of merit
- Ribbon: Silver with two Black stripes on either side. (Civilian); Silver with two Black stripes on either side and two gold stripes on each margin. (Military)
- Eligibility: (1) Civil, military; (2) military units; (3) foreign citizens.
- Awarded for: Special services rendered in the interests of Romania.
- Status: Currently awarded
- Grand Master: President Nicușor Dan
- Grades: Grand Cross; Grand Officer; Commander; Officer; Knight

Precedence
- Next (higher): National Order of Faithful Service
- Next (lower): None (Lowest)
- Related: National Medal for Merit
- The Grand Cross's ribbon bar of the Order (military version)

The National Order of Merit (Romanian: Ordinul Național Pentru Merit) is an order which is part of the National System of Decorations of Romania. A medal of merit also exists, but does not confer membership in the order.

== History ==
The current order continues a tradition going back well over a century.

== Composition of the order ==
The National Order of Merit is awarded in five grades in civil and military divisions, as well as a wartime division. It may be awarded to Romanians, foreign citizens, and military units. Its number is limited to 7,500 members. Members of the order are referred to as Knights of the Order for Merit, regardless of grade. Awards to foreigners, awards to military units, and awards in the wartime division are not figured in the total number under the order's limits. Awards are limited by grade and division as follows:

- Grand Cross, 150 civilian and 50 military
- Grand Officer, 300 civilian and 100 military
- Commander, 675 civilian and 225 military
- Officer, 1,500 civilian and 500 military
- Knight, 3,000 civilian and 1,000 military

== Criteria ==
The National Order of merit recognizes important civil or military services rendered to Romania. Qualifying important services may include:

- Safeguarding the independence, sovereignty, territorial unity and integrity of the Romanian State
- Developing the national economy
- Accomplishments in the fields of science, art, or culture
- Contribution to the development of relationships between Romania and other countries or international organizations
- Meritorious military service organizing and managing military operations
- Deeds committed on the battlefield or during military conflicts

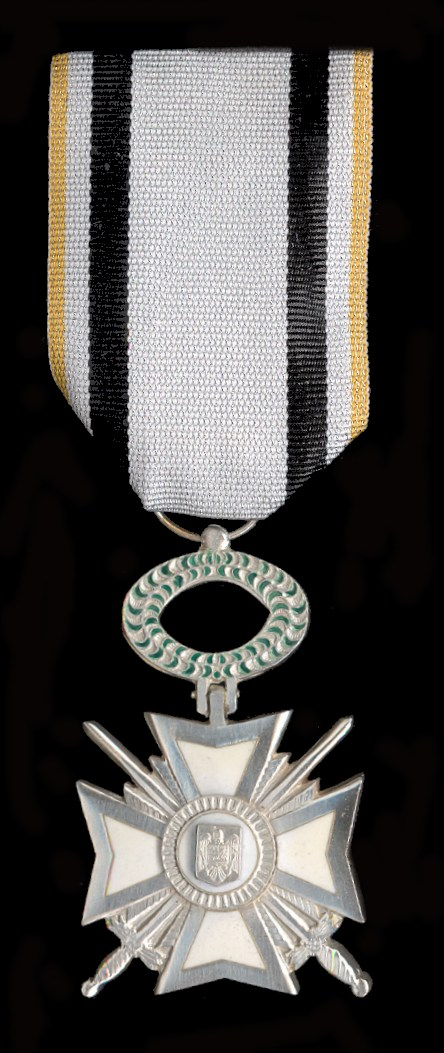
Wartime Knight's Cross of the Order

== Notable recipients ==
=== Historical form ===
- Moses Gaster (1856–1939), "For Merit" National Order of the first class (1891)

=== Current form ===
- Nineta Bărbulescu
- Marek Belka
- Valentina Butnaru
- Matilda Caragiu Marioțeanu
- Ion Caramitru
- Franz, Duke of Bavaria
- Mircea Hava
- Keith Hitchins
- Ion Jinga
- Mark A. Meyer
- Mihnea Motoc
- Raymond T. Odierno
- Mircea Răceanu
- Prince Radu of Romania
- Stoian Stelian
- Iancu Țucărman
- Tomáš Kopták, Slovakia
- Martin Drobňák, Slovakia
