= Decorations of the Romanian Armed Forces =

This article is about the decorations of the Romanian Armed Forces.

The Ministry of National Defence of Romanian awards honorific decorations to show appreciation for conduct in mission. This decorations are not included in the Romanian System of Orders and Medals.

The decorations consist of emblems, honorific insignia, plaques, honorific titles, and service distinctions.

== Emblems ==
1. Honour emblems
  1. Emblema Onoarea Armatei României
  2. Emblema de Onoare a Statului Major General
  3. Emblema de Onoare a Forţelor Terestre
  4. Emblema de Onoare a Forţelor Aeriene
  5. Emblema de Onoare a Forţelor Navale
  6. Emblema de Onoare a Logisticii
  7. Emblema de Onoare a Prizonierului de Război
  8. Emblema de Onoare a Informatiilor Pentru Aparare
2. Merit emblems
  1. Emblema de Merit „În Serviciul Armatei României”
  2. Emblema de Merit „În Slujba Păcii”
  3. Emblema de Merit „Acţiuni Umanitare”
  4. Emblema de Merit „Ştiinţa Militară”
  5. Emblema de Merit „Rezerva Armatei României”
  6. Emblema de Merit „Partener pentru Apărare”

== Honorific insignia ==
Awarded on the occasion of the anniversary of special events

== Honorific plaques ==
1. anniversary occasions
2. reward for professional, sports, and artistic achievements
3. reward to foreign (visiting) military personnel
4. when leaving a military unit or pension

== Honorific titles ==
Awarded to special units, or graduation series.

== Service distinctions ==
1. military oath
2. graduating from different military educational institutions
3. taking part to foreign missions
4. fulfilling missions
5. taking part to multinational exercises
6. having academic titles
7. special results in the academic training
