= Medal of Faithful Service =

Medal of Faithful Service Medalia națională "Serviciul Credincios"
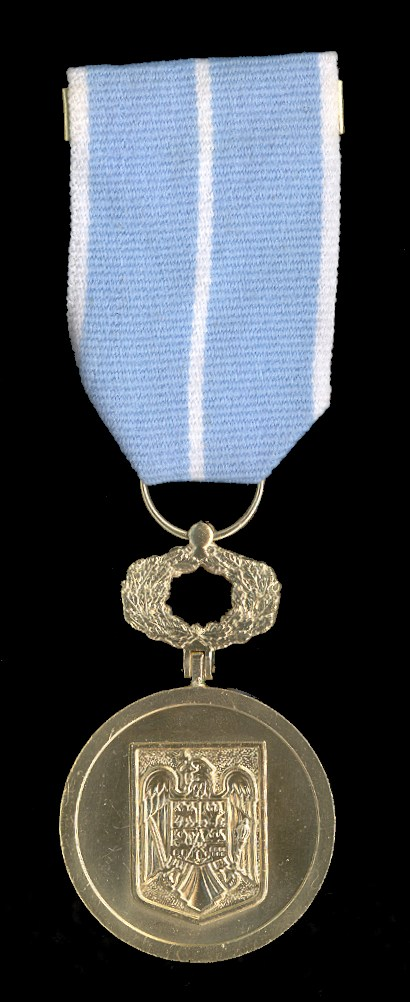
- Third Class Medal of Faithful Service, civil division (modern version)
- Type: Multiple classes civil and military national medal (listed from lowest to highest): Third Class; Second Class; First Class
- Awarded for: (1) Exceptional civil and military services to the Romanian State and the Romanian people; (2) For special acts in time of peace or for heroic acts in time of war; (3) For contributing to the development of the friendship relations with Romania, or for other exceptional services to the Romanian State and the Romanian People
- Country: Romania
- Presented by: The King of Romania (1878 - 1947); The President of Romania (since 2000)
- Eligibility: (1) Civil, military; (2) military units; (3) foreign citizens
- Status: Currently awarded
- Established: 1878 reestablished 2000
- Ribbon bar of the medal

Precedence
- Next (higher): Cross of Faithful Service
- Next (lower): National Medal for Merit
- Related: Order of Faithful Service

The Medal of Faithful Service (Romanian: Medalia națională "Serviciul Credincios") was instituted by King Carol I in April 1878.

== History ==
The medal was worn until 1932 on a light blue ribbon with a yellow central stripe on the left side of the chest. From 1932, the award was presented on a light blue ribbon with a yellow central stripe and a silver edge stripe.

=== WWII ===
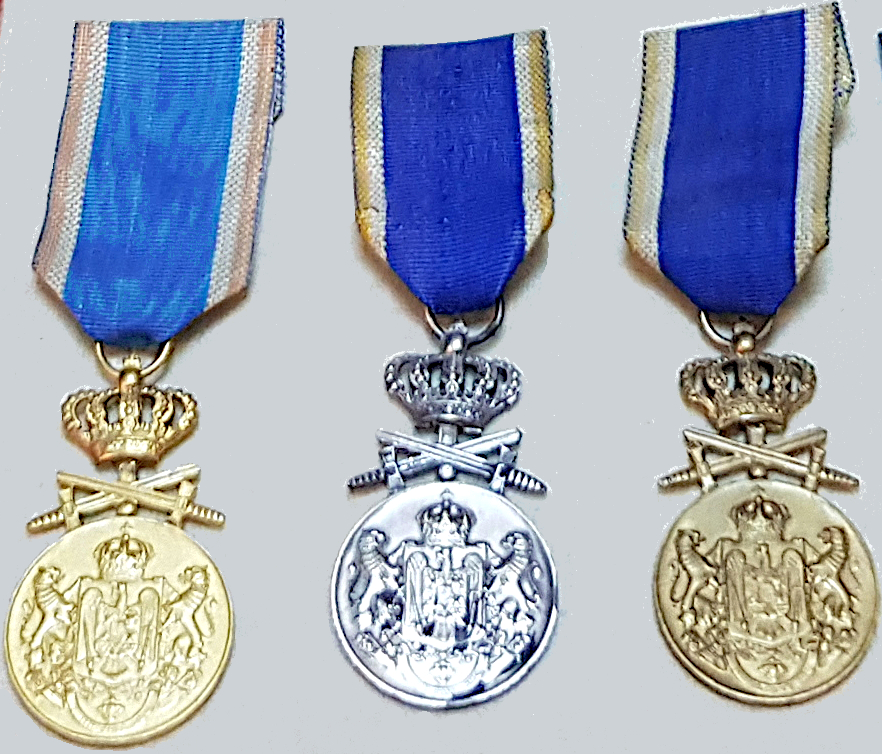
All three classes, model 1932.

During the Second World War from 1941 to 1944, the medal with swords was also awarded to members of the German Wehrmacht.

=== Post-WWII ===
In early 1948, together with the Order, Cross and all the traditional Romanian orders were disbanded by the communist authorities.

==== Re-institution ====
In 2000, it was re-instituted together with the Order and Cross, as a three class medal. It is the second most important award for people without higher education, the equivalent of the Order of Faithful Service.
