= William Treanor =

American lawyer

William M. Treanor
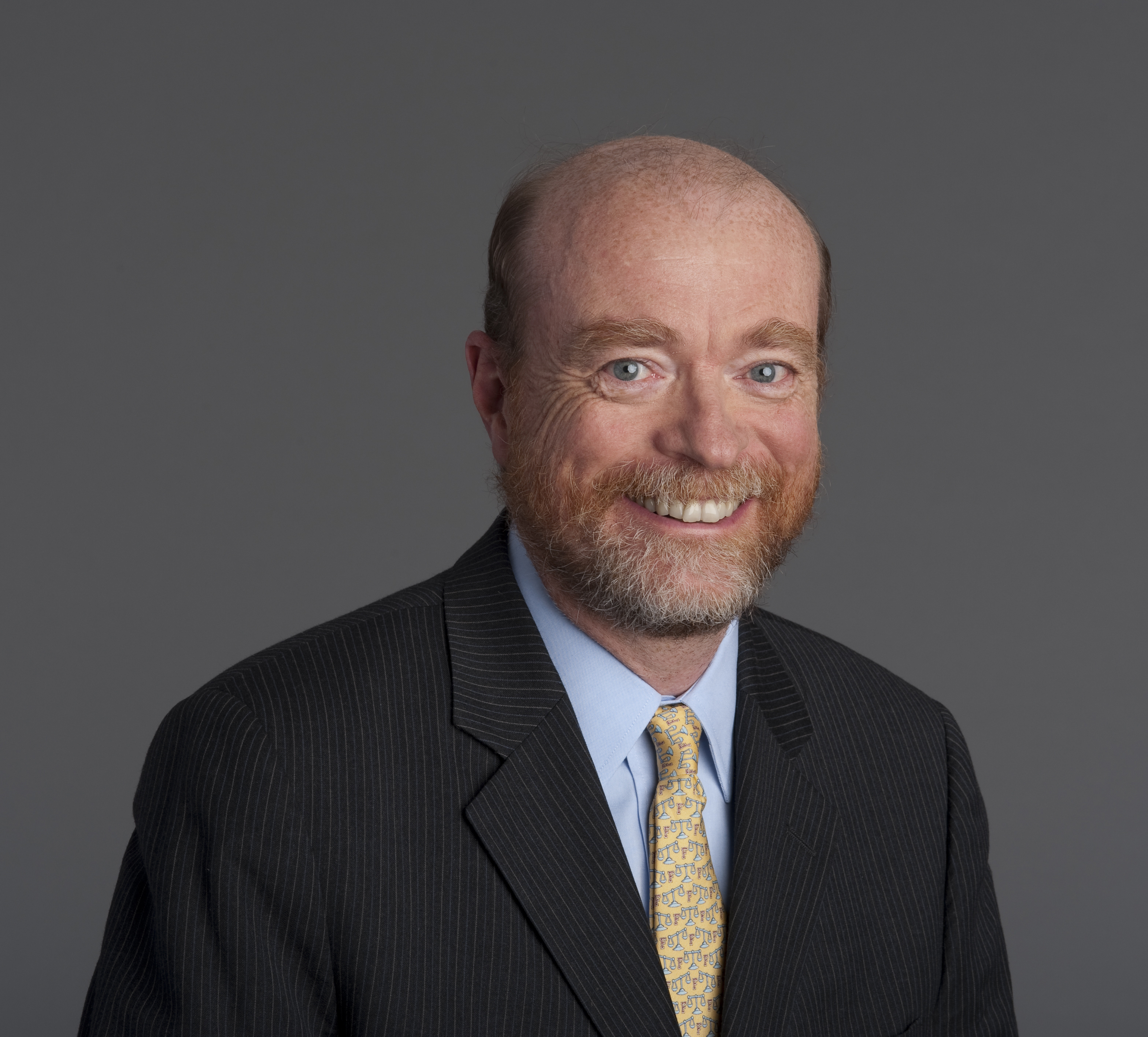
- Born: William Michael Treanor; November 16, 1957 (age 68)
- Education: Yale University (BA, JD); Harvard University (PhD)

William Michael Treanor (born November 16, 1957) is an American attorney and legal scholar. He served as the Dean of Georgetown University Law Center from 2010 to 2025. He was the former dean of Fordham University School of Law. Treanor is an expert on constitutional law, having been cited three times in Supreme Court opinions. He holds the title of Agnes Williams Sesquicentennial Professor of Constitutional Law and Constitutional History and Dean Emeritus and continues to teach as a professor at Georgetown Law. Treanor has held several high-profile government positions and is an advocate of civil service. Treanor's teaching and work evidence his commitment to his philosophy of a complete legal education: "Intellectual excellence, the craft of lawyering, and dedication to public service."

== Personal ==
Treanor graduated summa cum laude and Phi Beta Kappa from Yale College in 1979, where he was an active member of the Yale Political Union. He obtained an M.A. in history from Harvard University in 1982. He then entered Harvard Law School, but transferred to Yale Law School because he felt they focused more on public service. He was Article and Book Review Editor of the Yale Law Journal and graduated with a J.D. in 1985. He was awarded a PhD in History from Harvard University in 2010.

On October 15, 1994, Treanor married Allison Derivaux Ames, who was then director of strategic planning for corporate publicity and special events at Saks Fifth Avenue in New York City. He has two children, Liam and Katherine.

== Dean of Fordham Law School and Georgetown Law ==
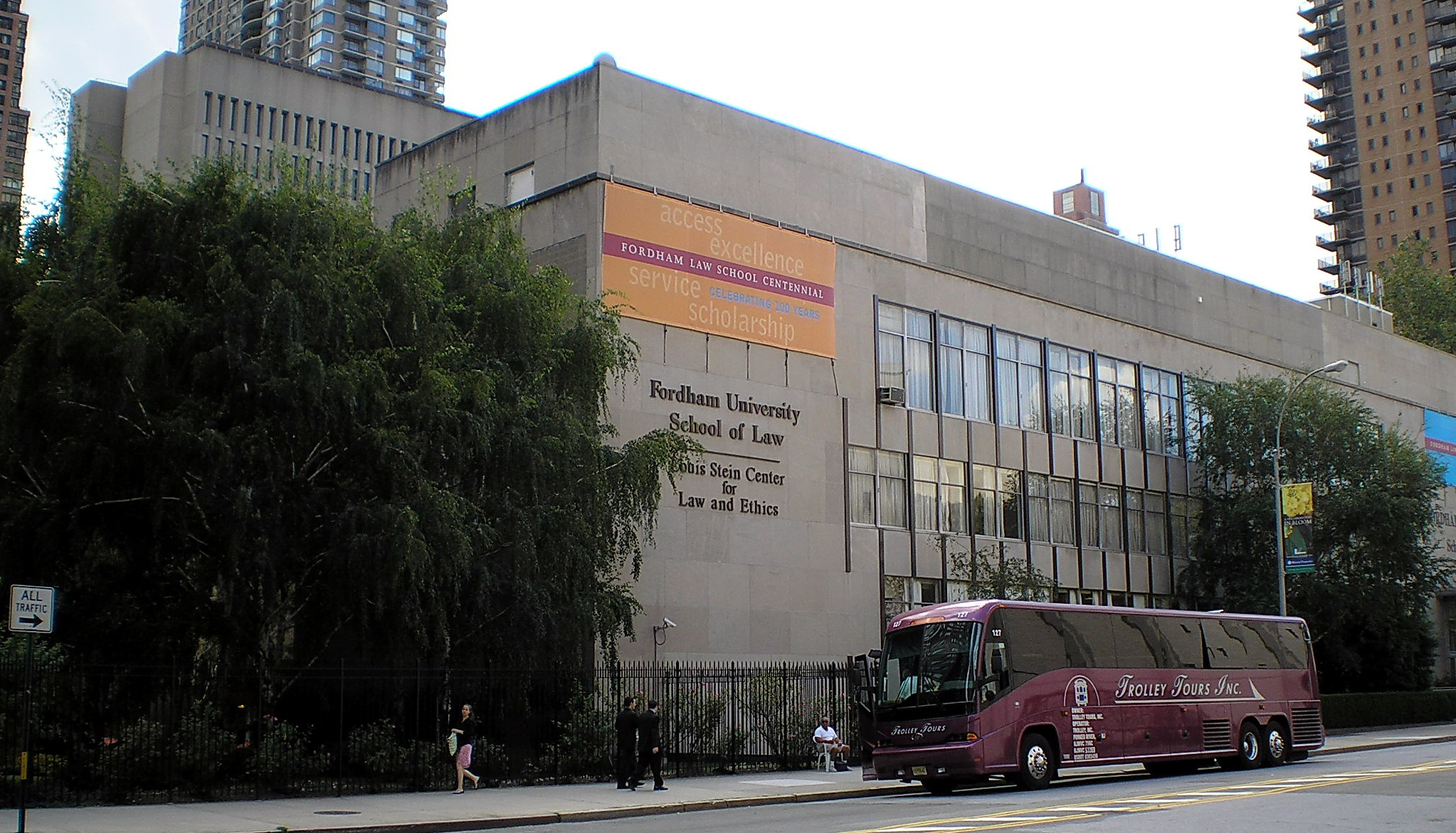

Treanor's biggest commitment remains to legal scholarship. "William Treanor represents a new generation of scholars and teachers at Fordham's School of Law," said the Rev. Joseph A. O'Hare, S.J., president of Fordham University at the time of Treanor's appointment. When he first arrived to teach at Fordham in 1991, he evidenced his broad command of legal subjects in courses such as property, land use, intellectual property, constitutional law, criminal law, and legal history. In 1998, he went on leave from the university to serve as deputy assistant attorney general in the Justice Department's Office of Legal Counsel, before returning in 2002.

"As dean of the law school, you're required to do both broad-level thinking and strategic planning," said Treanor in regard to challenges as a law school dean. On July 17, 2006, Treanor announced to students and faculty that the school surpassed the $20 million mark for new gifts and pledges. This was in stark contrast to the levels reached in 2004 ($4.2 million) and 2005 ($6.9 million). The funds will help establish six new chairs and start the Feerick Center for Social Justice and Dispute Resolution, named in honor of Treanor's predecessor, John Feerick.

Plans for a new skyscraper were unveiled to accommodate increasing enrollment numbers, and the school ranks fifth in the country in placing its graduates at top-shelf law firms. But Treanor is not just concerned with growth and reputation. Like the law deans of Harvard (which built a state-of-the-art law student gym, limited class size to 80 students, and mandated individualized written feedback for every student in every course throughout the semester), and Yale (which abandoned the traditional law school grading system, does not rank its students, and has only one semester of required classes), Treanor has attempted to address the students' quality of life. In a 2006 interview, Treanor reported instituting free cupcakes and ice cream to alleviate the intensity of law school finals. Gifts to students, though, are in the offing: At the end of the 2006 academic year, Treanor worked for the purveyance of free flip-flops with Fordham's imprint on the bottom. "I feel obliged to make the Fordham experience for our students as special as possible," said Treanor. Fordham maintains a strict grading curve policy and a year-long 1L curriculum.

On June 29, 2010, it was announced that Dean Treanor would become the new executive vice president and Dean of Georgetown University Law Center, beginning August 16, 2010.

Under Treanor's leadership, Georgetown Law expanded the number of certified experiential offerings from 450 to more than 2000 seats and boosted its clinical faculty. Georgetown’s clinical legal program is regularly ranked #1 in U.S. News and World Report. Recognizing the need for lawyers to expand their skill set in a competitive market, he helped launch the Georgetown Business Law Scholars Program and the Institute for Technology Law and Policy.

He launched the RISE program, which helps students from historically underrepresented groups build community and succeed in law school, and the Early Outreach Initiative, which sends Georgetown Law students and the Dean of Admissions to underserved high schools to encourage students to pursue careers in the law.

During Treanor's tenure, Georgetown Law established a new program of post-graduate fellowships, which offer intensive training and opportunities for graduates to start public service careers. In 2015, in conjunction with the law firms DLA Piper and Arent Fox, Georgetown Law launched the D.C. Affordable Law Firm, an innovative "low-bono" model serving lower-income residents who cannot afford a lawyer but do not qualify for free legal aid. In 2016, the Law Center joined with Georgetown's Medical Center and School of Medicine to create a medical-legal partnership—the Georgetown University Health Justice Alliance—dedicated to improved health and greater justice for those living in poverty

In 2012, Treanor was named a "champion" by the National Law Journal, one of the 25 "most influential in legal education" by the National Jurist and a recipient of the Dave Nee Foundation's David S. Stoner Uncommon Counselor Award.

In 2020, he was elected into the American Academy of Arts & Sciences for law and education. That same year, he was selected for the inaugural Honorable Robert A. Katzmann Award for Academic Excellence by the Burton Awards. In 2025, the World Jurist Association presented Treanor with the Medal of Honor for Academic Merit in recognition of his professional career and personal commitment to the defense and strengthening of the rule of law.

== Civil service ==
Treanor's career in the public sector began as a speechwriter for Secretary of Education Shirley Hufstedler, followed by a clerkship for Judge James L. Oakes of the U.S. Court of Appeals for the Second Circuit. During the Iran-Contra Investigation, Treanor served as associate independent counsel. Later he became deputy assistant attorney general in the Office of Legal Counsel, responsible for supplying advice to the White House and attorney general.

== Constitutional law scholar ==
Treanor has been cited in Supreme Court opinions four times, with his first being in Lucas v. South Carolina Coastal Council (1992). He was later cited by Chief Justice William Rehnquist in his dissent in Tahoe-Sierra Preservation Council, Inc. v. Tahoe Regional Planning Agency (2002). Recently, Treanor's article, “Judicial Review before Marbury,” chronicling understanding of the scope of constitutional judicial review before Marbury v. Madison was cited in the Moore v. Harper (2023) majority opinion written by Chief Justice John Roberts and he was also cited in the Landor v. Louisiana Department of Corrections and Public Safety (2026) majority opinion by Justice Neil Gorsuch.

Treanor has written in-depth about some of the most controversial and complex turn of the 20th century constitutional law issues. He examined Congress' authority to define and declare war under the War Powers Clause. He focused on the original understanding of the Founders on the takings clause of the United States Constitution, also known as eminent domain in the United States. He remains a prolific author of scholarly articles.

On June 6, 2006, he debated prominent classical liberal/libertarian law professor and published author Richard Epstein on the topic "Did Progressives Rewrite the Constitution?" The two also debated again about the Takings Clause on September 22, 2009, on the topic "Does the Law of Regulatory Takings Impede Growth or Protect the Community?"

== Response to Ed Martin Letter ==
On February 17, 2025, then Interim U.S. Attorney General for the District of Columbia Ed Martin wrote a letter to Treanor demanding that the school cease all efforts at diversity, equity and inclusion, asserting that he would not hire any Georgetown Law graduates if the school continued to “teach and utilize DEI.”

In a letter dated March 6, 2025, Treanor responded, “Your letter informs me that your office will deny our students and graduates government employment opportunities until you, as Interim United States Attorney for the District of Columbia, approve of our curriculum. Given the First Amendment’s protection of a university’s freedom to determine its own curriculum and how to deliver it, the constitutional violation behind this threat is clear, as is the attack on the University’s mission as a Jesuit and Catholic institution….We look forward to your confirming that any Georgetown-affiliated candidates for employment with your office will receive full and fair consideration.” Treanor's response was widely reported on as a part of a series of attacks by the Trump administration on the First Amendment rights of civil institutions.

== Quotes ==
- "With Walsh or Starr, the president and his supporters could more easily argue that a prosecutor was overzealous or irresponsible, because there had been a three-judge panel that appointed him. With Fitzgerald, you have a prosecutor who was appointed by the deputy attorney general [at the direction of the attorney general]. The administration almost has to stand behind him because this is someone they selected themselves. It is harder to criticize someone you yourself put into play."
- "Few areas of constitutional law have produced as much heated debate as the war powers area, heat produced in no small part by the passionate belief that this is a subject of incalculable consequence. But, stunningly and ironically, there is little connection between the issues that scholars debate and the constitutional issues involving war that government officials and political leaders confront."
- "The original understanding of the Takings Clause was, very simply, that the federal government had to compensate the property owner when it physically took property --such as when it took land to build a fort. The clause did not require compensation for regulations under any circumstances."
- "Despite the public prominence of the property rights argument, there is actually nothing novel or particularly controversial about the conclusion that the Takings Clause was limited to physical seizures. With some notable exceptions, prominent legal scholars of all shades of political opinion—including such leading conservatives as former judge Robert Bork and former Solicitor General Charles Fried--support the conclusion that the property rights argument has no plausible foundation in the original understanding of the Takings Clause."
- "[Fordham Law School is] pleased to rank in the top five [in placing graduates at the most successful firms]. We focus our education on practicing the law as well as knowing the law, so firms have come to realize that our graduates are prepared to work effectively right from the start. And our location in Manhattan within walking distance of many of the country's elite firms assures that there are exceptional opportunities available for students."
- "This is a time of change for legal practice. The change in the economy precipitated changes that would have come inevitably…It does cause us to rethink how we prepare lawyers."
- "Georgetown is a law school with incredible strength, so both in the first year and longer term, what I see as my mission is to build on those strengths. We'll be focusing on experiential learning, externships and increasing opportunities in those areas. We're going to be focusing on the academic depth and intellect strengths of the law school and continue to build on that with new hires. I consider myself incredibly privileged to be here at this moment."
- "At no moment in the past fifty years has there been a greater consensus that the American criminal legal system is broken."

== Selected articles ==
- "The Case of the Dishonest Scriviner: Gouverneur Morris and the Creation of the Federalist Constitution", 120 Michigan Law Review 1 (2021)
- "Against Textualism", 103 Northwestern University Law Review 983 (2009)
- "Taking Text Too Seriously", 106 Michigan Law Review 487 (2007)
- Judicial Review before Marbury. 58 Stanford Law Review 455-562 (2005) [reprinted Fordham Law School Legal Studies Research Paper Series No. 85]
- Deans and Stories: Leading Minds. 36 The University of Toledo Law Review 207-211 (2004).
- The War Powers Outside the Courts, in Mark Tushnet ed. The Constitution in Wartime, 143-160. Durham, N.C.: Duke University Press, 2005
- Lochner's New Millennium: Copyright Term Extension, Constitutional Law, and Eldred v. Ashcroft, 112 Yale L.J. (2003) (with Paul Schwartz)
- The New Privacy, 101 Mich. L. Rev. 2163 (2003) (with Paul Schwartz) (book review)
- Jam for Justice Holmes: Reassessing the Significance of Mahon, 86 Georgetown Law Journal 813 (1998)
- Independent Counsel and Vigorous Prosecution and Investigation, 61 Law and Contemporary Problems 149 (1998)
- The Armstrong Principle, the Narratives of Takings, and Compensation Statutes, 38 William & Mary Law Review 1151 (1997)
- Learning from Lincoln, 65 Fordham Law Review 1781 (1997)
- Fame, the Founding, and the Power to Declare War, 82 Cornell Law Review 695 (1997)
- The Original Understanding of the Takings Clause and the Political Process, 95 Columbia Law Review 782 (1995)
- The Case of the Prisoners and the Origins of Judicial Review, 143 University of Pennsylvania Law Review 491 (1994)
- Prospective Overruling and the Revival of "Unconstitutional" Statutes, 93 Columbia Law Review 1902 (1993) (with Gene Sperling)
- Taking the Framers Seriously, 55 University of Chicago Law Review 1016 (1988) (review of Walter Berns, Taking the Constitution Seriously (1987))
- Note, The Origins and Original Significance of the Just Compensation Clause of the Fifth Amendment, 94 Yale Law Journal 694 (1985)

Academic offices
Preceded by John Feerick	Dean of the Fordham University School of Law; 2002–2010	Succeeded by Michael Martin
Preceded by T. Alexander Aleinikoff	Dean of the Georgetown University Law Center; 2010–2025	Succeeded by Joshua Teitelbaum; Acting
