= UAC =

UAC may refer to:

== Computing ==
- User Account Control, a security feature in Microsoft Windows
- Session Initiation Protocol#User agent client
- USB Audio Class

== Organizations ==
- Ulster Army Council, 1973 Northern Ireland loyalist paramilitary group
- Undeb Amaethwyr Cymru, the Farmer's Union of Wales
- Unemployment Action Center, a non-profit organization in New York City, US
- United Apostolic Church
- Union of Catholic Apostolate
- Université d’Abomey-Calavi, part of the National University of Benin
- United Africa Company, 20th-century British company
  - United Africa Company of Nigeria, formerly a subsidiary of United Africa Company
- United Aircraft Corporation, Russian aerospace and defense company
- United Arab Command, of the Arab League
- United Athletic Conference, a multi-sports NCAA Division I conference known before July 2026 as the Western Athletic Conference
  - United Athletic Conference (football), a college football conference that played in the 2023–2025 seasons before being merged into the all-sports United Athletic Conference
- Universidad Andina del Cusco, Peru
- Universities Admissions Centre, Australia
- Urban Appalachian Council, Cincinnati, US

== Other ==
- Unaccompanied Alien Children, United States government classification for children in immigration custody
- Unified Arab Code, a Civil Code produced by the Arab League between 1988 and 1996
- Urban adult contemporary, radio music format
- Union Aerospace Corporation, fictional military contractor in the Doom video game franchise
- UAC, a codon for the amino acid tyrosine
