= Fordham Urban Law Journal =

- Discipline: Law, public policy
- Language: English

Publication details
- History: 1972–present
- Publisher: Fordham University School of Law (United States)
- Frequency: 5/year
- Open access: Yes

Standard abbreviations
- Bluebook: Fordham Urb. L.J.
- ISO 4: Fordham Urban Law J.

Indexing
- ISSN: 0199-4646
- LCCN: 72625897
- OCLC no.: 01112939

Links
- Journal homepage; Online archive

The Fordham Urban Law Journal is a student-run law review published at Fordham University School of Law. The journal publishes articles on a wide range of themes, with a focus on public policy and issues affecting urban areas.

== Overview ==
The journal was established in 1972 and publishes five to six issues annually. It is the fifth-most cited student-edited specialty law journal in the United States and the seventh-most cited in judicial opinions. It is the sixth-most cited student-edited publication for public policy. Second-year law students apply for staff positions by participating in the school's unified writing competition. Editors are elected annually in the spring semester. The current editor-in-chief is Olivia Vladyka.

== Notable articles ==
Articles cited by the Supreme Court of the United States:

- Douglas E. Abrams, The Scope of Liability Under Section 12 of the Securities Act of 1933: "Participation" and the Pertinent Legislative Materials, Fordham Urb. L.J. 15:877 (1987).
- Ty Alper, Anesthetizing the Public Conscience: Lethal Injection and Animal Euthanasia, Fordham Urb. L.J. 35:817 (2008).
- Irma B. Ascher, Comment, Restrictions on Access to the Federal Courts in Civil Rights Actions: The Role of Abstention and Res Judicata, Fordham Urb. L.J. 6:481 (1978).
- Rory K. Little, The Federal Death Penalty: History and Some Thoughts About the Department of Justice's Role, Fordham Urb. L.J. 26:347 (1999).
- Mark Malone, Homelessness in a Modern Urban Setting, Fordham Urb. L.J. 10:749 (1982).

Most-cited articles.

- Bruce A. Green, Why Should Prosecutors "Seek Justice"?, Fordham Urb. L.J. 26:607 (1999)
- Rory K. Little, The Federal Death Penalty: History and Some Thoughts About the Department of Justice's Role, Fordham Urb. L.J. 26:347 (1999)
- Keith Aoki, Race, Space, and Place: the Relation Between Architectural Modernism, Post-Modernism, Urban Planning, and Gentrification, Fordham Urb. L.J. 20:699 (1993)
- Lucy A. Williams, Race, Rat Bites and Unfit Mothers: How Media Discourse Informs Welfare Legislation Debate, Fordham Urb. L.J. 22:1159 (1995)
- Gerald Torres, Environmental Burdens and Democratic Justice, Fordham Urb. L.J. 21:431 (1994)

Most-cited recent articles.

- Craig Gurian, A Return to Eyes on the Prize: Litigating Under the Restored New York City Human Rights Law , Fordham Urb. L.J. 33:255 (2006)
- Kimberlee K. Kovach, New Wine Requires New Wineskins: Transforming Lawyer Ethics for Effective Representation in a Non-Adversarial Approach to Problem Solving: Mediation , Fordham Urb. L.J. 28:935 (2001)
- Colin Gordon, Blighting the Way: Urban Renewal, Economic Development, and the Elusive Definition of Blight, Fordham Urb. L.J. 31:305 (2004)

== Events ==
The journal hosts the annual Cooper-Walsh Colloquium and an annual symposium to discuss issues relevant to public policy and legal discourse. Select symposium and colloquium submissions are published. Recent publications have focused on a diverse range of legal issues, including immigration, forensic evidence, the subprime mortgage crisis, and the use of eminent domain in New York City.

The journal also hosts various student and alumni events, awarding its Louis J. Lefkowitz award at an annual alumni banquet. In addition to presenting the Lefkowitz Award, the Alumni Association honors the incoming and outgoing editors of the Urban Law Journal, and announces the winners of its Urban Law Alumni Fellowship (a fellowship awarded to a student who has accepted a public interest summer position and demonstrated a commitment to the improvement of our urban communities) and the Student Author/Note Award (awarded to a student who has authored the most outstanding note in the preceding school year).

== Louis J. Lefkowitz Award ==
Each year the Fordham Law School Urban Law Journal Alumni Association (FULJAA) gives the Lefkowitz Award to a person who has made outstanding contributions to the law as it affects urban communities. The award is given in the spirit of Louis J. Lefkowitz, who served as New York Attorney General for almost twenty-two years (1957 through 1978).

- 2022 Barbara D. Underwood
- 2021 Hon. George J. Silver
- 2020 Lee M. Cortes, Jr.
- 2019 Valerie White
- 2017 Patrick J. Foye
- 2016 Maria L. Marcus
- 2015 Rosemonde Pierre-Lewis
- 2014 Rosanne Haggerty
- 2013 Helen R. Kanovsky
- 2012 Dennison Young, Jr.
- 2011 Joel Klein
- 2010 Charles J. Hynes
- 2009 Hon. Judith S. Kaye
- 2008 Kenneth R. Feinberg
- 2007 Raymond W. Kelly
- 2006 Hon George Bundy Smith
- 2005 Hon. Leslie Crocker Snyder
- 2004 Robert M. Morgenthau
- 2003 Constantine N. Katsoris
- 2002 Mary Jo White
- 2001 Mark Green
- 2000 Matthew Diller
- 1999 Jacqueline M. Nolan-Haley
- 1998 Joseph A. O'Hare
- 1997 Daniel T. Scannell
- 1996 Jacqueline W. Silbermann
- 1995 John J. Barrett
- 1994 Karen Burstein
- 1993 Matthew T. Crosson
- 1992 Charles L. Brieant
- 1991 John Feerick
- 1990 Frederick August Otto Schwarz
- 1989 Ross Sandler
- 1988 Andrew J. Maloney
- 1987 Stanley Fink
- 1986 Geraldine A. Ferraro
- 1985 Robert M. Hayes
- 1984 Robert Abrams
- 1983 John F. Keenan
- 1982 Archibald R. Murray
