= Matthew Diller =

11th dean of the Fordham University School of Law

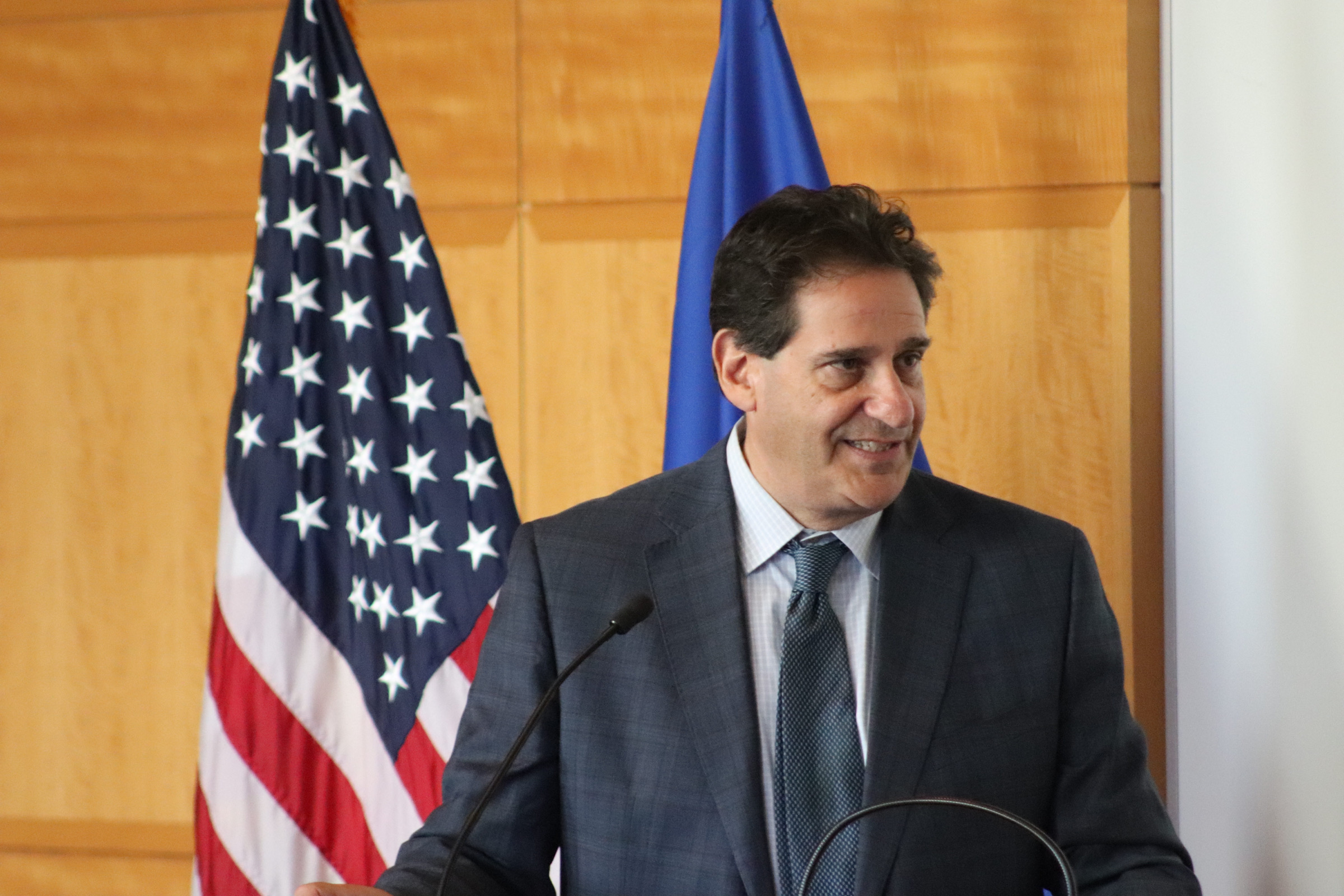
Matthew Diller

Matthew Diller is an American legal scholar who served as the eleventh dean of the Fordham University School of Law, and is currently president of the New York City Bar Association.

Diller is a scholar and advocate for access to justice and social welfare policy, including public assistance, social security, and disability programs. The Yale Law Journal, UCLA Law Review, NYU Law Review, Texas Law Review, and Michigan Law Review published his scholarly work. Diller's expert opinion is often cited by the New York Times. The City & State included Diller in The 2022 Law Power 100 list of "The legal minds influencing New York City and state politics".

He is a member of the New York State Permanent Commission on Access to Justice and is chair of the commission's Committee on Law School Involvement.

== Education and career ==
Diller received his Bachelor of Arts from Harvard University in 1981 and earned his Juris Doctor from Harvard Law School in 1985, both magna cum laude. While at Harvard, he served as an editor of the Harvard Law Review. From 1985 to 1986 he clerked at the US Court of Appeals for the Second Circuit for Judge Walter R. Mansfield. From 1986 to 1993 Diller was a staff attorney in the civil appeals and law reform unit of the Legal Aid Society in New York, where has later served on the board.

While at Legal Aid, he worked on a number of cases that improved lives of the poor and disabled. In Jiggetts v. Grinker, later called Jiggetts v. Dowling, the New York State courts ruled that the state must pay welfare recipients a monthly shelter allowance that reflects the actual cost of housing. The unanimous decision by the State Court of Appeals affirmed the role of the judiciary in approving the adequacy of housing subsidies and opened the way for a lower court to require the state to increase subsidies for some welfare recipients living in New York City.

Diller worked on Stieberger v. Sullivan, a challenge to the Social Security Administration's policy of "non-acquiescence" in decisions of the US Courts of Appeal on the standards for eligibility for federal disability benefits. A court in 1992 ruled that "the Federal Government improperly denied disability benefits to 20,000 mentally and physically impaired New Yorkers in the late 1970's and early 1980's by systematically and restrictively misapplying its own eligibility regulations."

He started teaching at Fordham Law in 1993, where he served as the co-director of the Louis Stein Center for Law and Ethics, and as the associate dean for academic affairs from 2003 to 2008. In 1999, Diller was scholar in residence at the Brennan Center for Justice at New York University School of Law. Diller served as the sixth dean of Cardozo Law School at Yeshiva University from 2009 to 2015 and has been the Fordham Law dean since 2015.

In 1991, the Association of the Bar of the City of New York honored him with a legal services award. In 2014, the AALS Section on Pro Bono and Public Service Opportunities awarded him the Deborah L. Rhode Award for his leadership in legal education and public service. In 2021, Diller gave the Charles Evans Hughes Lecture for the New York County Lawyers Association. It was printed in the NY Law Journal.

== Views ==
Under Diller's deanship, both Cardozo and Fordham Law have notably become active in endeavours for stronger access to justice and court reform on eviction prevention. He has supported reforms, activism and lawyers' involvement in defense of immigrants and the poor. In 2010, Diller supported increased diversity and inclusion of the LGBT+ community in Yeshiva University.

As the dean, since the onset of the COVID-19 pandemic, Diller notably reacted swiftly to adapt students to the coming realities of virtual litigation, remote recruiting, collaboration and work, and increasing role of artificial intelligence in law. "We must counter these far-reaching changes to the legal industry with meaningful and lasting adjustments of our own," he wrote in 2021 in the New York Law Journal. He said that since the beginning of the pandemic, he has transformed from the dean of "No" to the dean of "Yes!"

When Derek Chauvin was in 2021 convicted in George Floyd's murder case, Diller commented that the conviction came as a 'relief' and it made him 'hopeful for our future.'

In 2022, Diller wrote a letter to the vice-chancellor of Queen's University in Belfast, voicing "concern for the safety" of Professor Colin Harvey, who was criticized by unionist politicians in Ireland and abused on social media for supporting the constitutional change and processes envisioned in the 1998 Good Friday Agreement. Diller wrote he supported the Belfast university in "doing all it can to safeguard Colin as well as doing all it can to uphold the value of civil discourse and academic freedom".

== Personal life ==
Matthew Diller is married to Katherine Kennedy and they have two sons, Peter and Michael. He lives in Brooklyn and commutes by bicycle to the Fordham's Lincoln Center campus in Manhattan.
