= Fordham Journal of Corporate & Financial Law =

- Table of contents from Volume V, No. 1 of the Fordham Journal of Corporate & Financial Law, the first issue since the name change
- Language: English

Publication details
- History: 1996 to present
- Publisher: Fordham University School of Law (United States)
- Frequency: triannual

Standard abbreviations
- Bluebook: Fordham J. Corp. & Fin. L.
- ISO 4: Fordham J. Corp. Financ. Law

Indexing
- ISSN: 1532-303X

Links
- Journal homepage

Table of contents from Volume 1 of the Financial, Securities & Tax Law Forum, the precursor to the Fordham Journal of Corporate & Financial Law

The Fordham Journal of Corporate & Financial Law was founded in 1996 at Fordham University School of Law as the Financial, Securities & Tax Law Forum until 1999, when Fordham Law School's faculty unanimously voted to designate it as an honor journal. The Fordham Journal of Corporate & Financial Law name was adopted to reflect this change. The Journal further began publishing at least three times a year at this time. In 2006, the Journal was the most cited specialty journal in banking and finance and has been cited by the Supreme Court of the United States.

First year students are given the opportunity to "write on" to the journal in May as part of the school-wide journal writing competition. Published works are made available on HeinOnline, FLASH, and WestLaw. In addition, the Journal works in conjunction with the Fordham Corporate Law Center to host an annual symposium featuring guest speakers on a relevant topic of corporate and financial law. Together, the Journal and Corporate Center also host the A.A. Sommer Jr. Lecture, the Albert A. DeStefano Lecture, and the Fred Dunbar Lecture in Law and Economics. The Journal also maintains a blog for additional commentary on corporate and financial legal topics.
