= Fordham Environmental Law Review =

- Discipline: Environmental law
- Language: English
- Edited by: Wilson Barlow

Publication details
- Former names: Fordham Environmental Law Report, Fordham Environmental Law Journal
- History: 1989-present
- Publisher: Fordham University School of Law (United States)
- Frequency: Triannual

Standard abbreviations
- Bluebook: Fordham Envtl. L. Rev.
- ISO 4: Fordham Environ. Law Rev.

Indexing
- ISSN: 1559-4785
- LCCN: 2004250079
- OCLC no.: 819172252

Links
- Journal homepage; Online archive

The Fordham Environmental Law Review is a triannual law journal published by students at Fordham University School of Law, addressing topics in environmental law, legislation, and public policy. It was established in 1989 as the Fordham Environmental Law Report and changed in 1993 to the Fordham Environmental Law Journal. In 2004, the journal obtained its current name. The journal publishes three issues annually: one centered around a symposium, along with fall and spring issues. It is the 10th-most-cited student-edited environmental journal by other law journals. As of its 2025-2026 volume, the editor-in-chief was Wilson Barlow.
