= Toni Jaeger-Fine =

American jurist

- Born: 7 February 1961 (age 65); New York, U.S.
- Education: Harpur College (BA); Duke Law School (JD)
- Employer: Fordham Law School
- Known for: Legal education expert, professionalism expert, expert in the US legal system

Toni Jaeger-Fine (born 1961) is an American lawyer, author, speaker, and law school administrator.

Jaeger-Fine is the author of the book Becoming a Lawyer: Discovering and Defining Your Professional Persona, published in 2018 by West. She lectured nationally and worldwide about elements that define the profile of a truly professional and flourishing lawyer.

She also published several books and speaks widely on the US legal system including American Legal Systems: A Resource and Reference Guide and The U.S. Legal System: Cases and Materials. Together with Desiree Jaeger-Fine, she published the book Mastering the U.S. LL.M.: From Whether to When, What, Where, and How. Thomson published her book An Introduction to the Anglo-American Legal System, which has been translated into Italian, Korean, and Portuguese languages. She authored legal articles on marriage equality and higher education management.

Jaeger-Fine is the assistant dean of international and non-J.D. programs at Fordham University School of Law in New York City. Previously, she was the associate director of the Global Law program at New York University School of Law and Cardozo Law School, and was an associate at Crowell & Moring. Toni Jaeger-Fine regularly writes blogs about professionalism on YourProfessionalPersona.com.

Jaeger-Fine is a recognized expert on international legal education programs and globalization of legal profession. In 2022, she received the Dean's Medal of Recognition, "the highest award the Dean can confer upon a member of the Fordham Law community."

As a consultant and author about diversity in legal profession, she claimed that "law is the profession most lacking in diversity in the United States."
