= Twenty-fifth Amendment to the United States Constitution =

1967 amendment enumerating presidential succession

The Twenty-fifth Amendment (Amendment XXV) to the United States Constitution addresses issues related to presidential succession and disability.

It clarifies that the vice president becomes president if the president dies, resigns, or is removed from office by impeachment. It also establishes the procedure for filling a vacancy in the office of the vice president.

The amendment provides for the temporary transfer of the president's powers and duties to the vice president, either on the president's initiative alone or on the initiative of the vice president, together with a majority of the president's cabinet. In either case, the vice president becomes the acting president until the president's powers and duties are restored.

The amendment was submitted to the states on July 6, 1965, by the 89th Congress, and was adopted on February 10, 1967, the day the requisite number of states (38) ratified it.

== Text and effect ==
=== Section 1: Presidential succession ===
Section 1. In case of the removal of the President from office or of his death or resignation, the Vice President shall become President.

Section 1 clarifies that in the enumerated situations the vice president becomes president, instead of merely assuming the powers and duties of the presidency as acting president. It operates automatically, without needing to be explicitly invoked.

=== Section 2: Vice presidential vacancy ===
Section 2. Whenever there is a vacancy in the office of the Vice President, the President shall nominate a Vice President who shall take office upon confirmation by a majority vote of both Houses of Congress.

Section 2 provides a mechanism for filling a vacancy in the vice presidency. Before the Twenty-fifth Amendment, a vice-presidential vacancy continued until a new vice president took office at the start of the next presidential term; the vice presidency had become vacant several times due to death, resignation, or accession to the presidency, and these vacancies had often lasted several years.

=== Section 3: President's declaration of inability ===
Section 3. Whenever the President transmits to the President pro tempore of the Senate and the Speaker of the House of Representatives his written declaration that he is unable to discharge the powers and duties of his office, and until he transmits to them a written declaration to the contrary, such powers and duties shall be discharged by the Vice President as Acting President.

Section 3 allows the president to voluntarily transfer presidential authority to the vice president (for example, in anticipation of a medical procedure) by declaring in writing their inability to discharge the presidency's powers and duties. The vice president then assumes those powers and duties as acting president. (Note: As acting president, the vice president may employ "all the powers and tools of the office of the president", taking actions such as moving troops, reporting on the state of the Union, proposing budgets, nominating judges, and removing cabinet secretaries. But it is unclear whether the vice president, while acting president, retains all the powers and duties of the vice presidency; for example, authorities express reservation as to whether the vice president would continue to preside over the Senate, especially since doing so could put him or her in the position of overseeing the Senate's deliberations on the validity of his or her determination, under Section 4, that the president is unable to discharge his or her duties. Article I, Section 3, clause 5 of the Constitution provides that, "The Senate shall chuse their other Officers, and also a President pro tempore, in the Absence of the Vice President, or when he shall exercise the Office of President of the United States.") The vice president does not become president; the president remains in office, though without authority. The president regains those powers and duties upon declaring in writing his ability to discharge them.

=== Section 4: Declaration by vice president and cabinet members of president's inability ===
Section 4. Whenever the Vice President and a majority of either the principal officers of the executive departments or of such other body as Congress may by law provide, transmit to the President pro tempore of the Senate and the Speaker of the House of Representatives their written declaration that the President is unable to discharge the powers and duties of his office, the Vice President shall immediately assume the powers and duties of the office as Acting President.

Thereafter, when the President transmits to the President pro tempore of the Senate and the Speaker of the House of Representatives his written declaration that no inability exists, he shall resume the powers and duties of his office unless the Vice President and a majority of either the principal officers of the executive department [sic] (Note: Here the word department should read departments. John Feerick, one of the drafters, later wrote that on the very day the Senate was to vote on the amendment, "I noticed a scrivener's error in the draft of the conference report. When I reached Senator Bayh's staff by telephone, possibly on July 6, with my observation, I was told that the amendment had just been approved that day by the Senate, 68 to 5, and was on its way to the states for ratification. In other words, the amendment was beyond rescue for correction.") or of such other body as Congress may by law provide, transmit within four days to the President pro tempore of the Senate and the Speaker of the House of Representatives their written declaration that the President is unable to discharge the powers and duties of his office. Thereupon Congress shall decide the issue, assembling within forty-eight hours for that purpose if not in session. If the Congress, within twenty-one days after receipt of the latter written declaration, or, if Congress is not in session, within twenty-one days after Congress is required to assemble, determines by two-thirds vote of both Houses that the President is unable to discharge the powers and duties of his office, the Vice President shall continue to discharge the same as Acting President; otherwise, the President shall resume the powers and duties of his office.

Section 4 addresses the case of a president who cannot discharge the powers and duties of the presidency but also cannot, or does not, execute the voluntary declaration contemplated by Section 3. It allows the vice president, together with a "majority of either the principal officers of the executive departments or of such other body as Congress may by law provide", (Note: No such "other body" has ever been designated, though there have been proposals. Congress's discretion in designating such a body and how it would deliberate is "vast" – it could even designate itself – but any designating act would be subject to presidential veto (which in turn can be overridden by two-thirds of both the House and Senate) just like any other statute. Should such a body be created, it would become the only body capable of acting in concert with the vice president under Section 4; the 15 cabinet officers would have no role. But the vice president's participation is essential, and vacancy in the vice presidency rules out invocation of Section 4.) to issue a written declaration that the president is unable to discharge his duties. When such a declaration is sent to Congress, the vice president immediately becomes acting president, (Note: The transfer of power to the vice president occurs at the moment the declaration is sent to the Speaker and President pro tempore, not at the moment of receipt, and regardless of whether Congress is in session at the time of transmittal.) while (as with Section 3) the president remains in office, temporarily divested of authority.

John Feerick, the principal draftsman of the amendment, writes that Congress deliberately left the terms unable and inability undefined "since cases of inability could take various forms not neatly fitting into [a rigid] definition [...] The debates surrounding the Twenty-fifth Amendment indicate that [those terms] are intended to cover all cases in which some condition or circumstance prevents the President from discharging his powers and duties". A survey of scholarship on the amendment found

no specific threshold—medical or otherwise—for the "inability" contemplated in Section 4. The framers specifically rejected any definition of the term, prioritizing flexibility. Those implementing Section 4 should focus on whether—in an objective sense taking all of the circumstances into account—the President is "unable to discharge the powers and duties" of the office. The amendment does not require that any particular type or amount of evidence be submitted to determine that the President is unable to perform his duties. While the framers did imagine that medical evidence would be helpful to the determination of whether the President is unable, neither medical expertise nor diagnosis is required for a determination of inability [...] To be sure, foremost in [the minds of the framers] was a physical or mental impairment. But the text of Section 4 sets forth a flexible standard intentionally designed to apply to a wide variety of unforeseen emergencies.

Among potential examples of such unforeseen emergencies, legal scholars have listed kidnapping of the president and "political emergencies" such as impeachment. Traits such as unpopularity, incompetence, impeachable conduct, poor judgment, or laziness might not in themselves constitute inability, but should such traits "rise to a level where they prevented the President from carrying out his or her constitutional duties, they still might constitute an inability, even in the absence of a formal medical diagnosis." In addition, a president who already manifested disabling traits at the time he was elected is not thereby immunized from a declaration of inability.

The "principal officers of the executive department[s]" are the 15 Cabinet members enumerated in the United States Code at 5 U.S.C. § 101:

- Secretary of State
- Secretary of the Treasury
- Secretary of Defense
- Attorney General
- Secretary of the Interior
- Secretary of Agriculture
- Secretary of Commerce
- Secretary of Labor
- Secretary of Health and Human Services
- Secretary of Housing and Urban Development
- Secretary of Transportation
- Secretary of Energy
- Secretary of Education
- Secretary of Veterans Affairs
- Secretary of Homeland Security

Acting secretaries can participate in issuing the declaration.

If the president subsequently issues a declaration claiming to be able, then a four-day period begins during which the vice president remains acting president. If, by the end of this period, the vice president and a majority of the "principal officers" have not issued a second declaration of the president's inability, the president resumes his powers and duties; but if they do issue a second declaration within those four days, then the vice president remains acting president while Congress considers the matter. Then, if within 21 days the Senate and the House determine, each by a two-thirds vote, that the president is unable, the vice president remains acting president; otherwise the president resumes his powers and duties. (Note: If Congress is in session when it receives the second declaration of incapacity, the 21 days begin at that point; otherwise they begin at the end of the 48 hours given for Congress to assemble. The president resumes his powers and duties when either the Senate or the House holds a vote on the question that falls short of the two-thirds requirement or the 21 days pass without both votes having been taken.)

Section 4's requirement of a two-thirds vote in both the House and the Senate is stricter than the Constitution's requirement for impeachment and removal of the president for "high crimes and misdemeanors"—a majority of the House followed by two-thirds of the Senate. (Note: United States Constitution, Article I, Section 3, Clauses 6 and 7.) In addition, an impeached president retains his authority unless and until the Senate votes to remove him or her at the end of an impeachment trial; in contrast, should Congress be called upon to decide the question of the president's ability or inability under Section 4, presidential authority remains in the hands of the vice president (as acting president) unless and until the question is resolved in the president's favor.

== Historical background ==
Article II, Section 1, Clause 6 of the Constitution reads:

In Case of the Removal of the President from Office, or of his Death, Resignation, or Inability to discharge the Powers and Duties of the said Office, the Same shall devolve on the Vice President

This provision is ambiguous as to whether, under the enumerated circumstances, the vice president becomes president (that is, the "Office [...] shall devolve on" the vice president) or merely assumes the "powers and duties" of the presidency (that is, the "Powers and Duties [...] shall devolve upon" the vice president). It also fails to define inability or to say how questions about inability are to be resolved. The Twenty-fifth Amendment addresses these deficiencies. The ambiguities in Article II, Section 1, Clause 6 of the Constitution regarding death, resignation, removal, or disability of the president created difficulties several times:

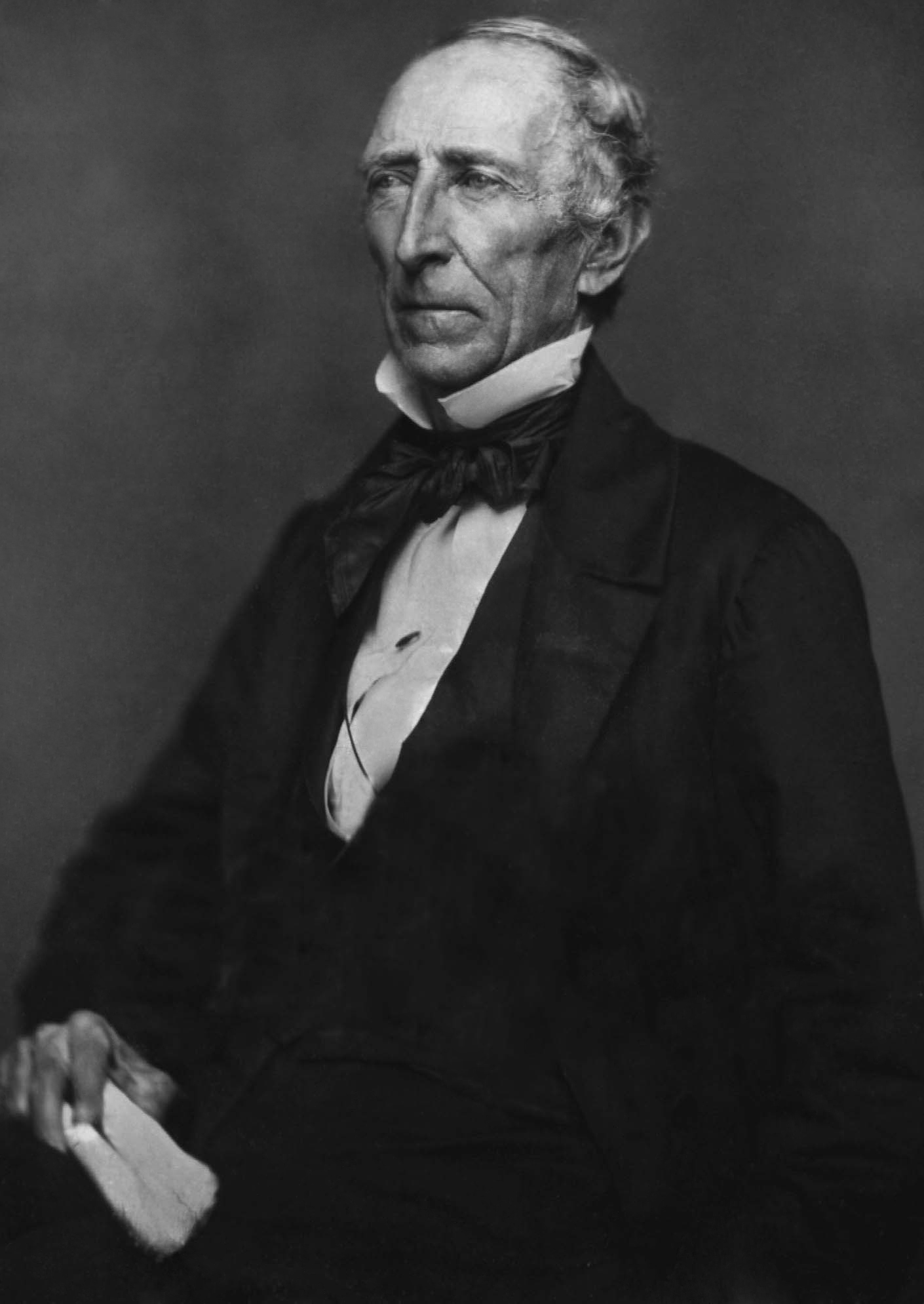
Upon the death of William Henry Harrison, John Tyler (pictured) became the first incumbent vice president to succeed to the presidency.

- In 1841, William Henry Harrison died in office. It had previously been suggested that the vice president would become acting president upon the president's death, but Vice President John Tyler asserted that he had succeeded to the presidency, instead of merely assuming its powers and duties; he also declined to acknowledge documents referring to him as "acting president". Although Tyler felt his vice-presidential oath obviated any need for the presidential oath, he was persuaded that being formally sworn in would resolve any doubts. Accordingly, he took the oath and title of "President", without any qualifiers, moved into the White House, and assumed full presidential powers. Tyler was sometimes derided as "His Accidency", but both houses of Congress adopted a resolution confirming that he was president. The Tyler Precedent of succession was thus established, and subsequently Vice Presidents Millard Fillmore (1850), Andrew Johnson (1865), Chester A. Arthur (1881), Theodore Roosevelt (1901), Calvin Coolidge (1923), Harry S. Truman (1945), and Lyndon B. Johnson (1963) were all deemed to have become president on the death of incumbent presidents. Section 1 codified this precedent.
- In 1893, Grover Cleveland secretly had cancer surgery, after which he was incapacitated for a time and kept from public view.
- After Woodrow Wilson's stroke in 1919, no one officially assumed his powers and duties, in part because his wife, Edith Wilson, and the White House physician, Cary T. Grayson, kept his condition secret. By the time Wilson's condition became public knowledge, only a few months remained in his term and Congressional leaders were disinclined to press the issue.
- By 1967, the office of vice president had become vacant 16 times when the vice president died, resigned, or succeeded to the presidency. The vacancy created when Andrew Johnson succeeded to the presidency upon Abraham Lincoln's assassination was one of several that encompassed nearly an entire four-year term. In 1868, Johnson was impeached by the House of Representatives and came one vote short of being removed from office by the Senate in his impeachment trial. Had Johnson been removed, President pro tempore Benjamin Wade would have become acting president in accordance with the Presidential Succession Act of 1792.
- After several periods of incapacity due to severe health problems, President Dwight D. Eisenhower attempted to clarify procedures through a signed agreement with Vice President Richard Nixon, drafted by Attorney General Herbert Brownell Jr., but this agreement had no legal authority. Eisenhower suffered a heart attack in September 1955 and intestinal problems requiring emergency surgery in July 1956. Each time, until Eisenhower was able to resume his duties, Nixon presided over Cabinet meetings and, along with Eisenhower aides, kept the executive branch functioning and assured the public the situation was under control. But Nixon refused to use the president's White House office or sit in the president's chair at Cabinet meetings.

The 1951 novel The Caine Mutiny and its 1954 film version influenced the amendment's drafters. In 2018, John Feerick called the film a "live depiction" of the type of crisis that could arise "if a president ever faced questions about physical or mental inabilities but disagreed completely with the judgment", a situation the Constitution did not address. Lawmakers drafting the amendment intentionally omitted any wording that the vice president or other officials could exploit to depose the president merely by saying that he was "disabled", as the crew in the novel did to Captain Queeg.

== Proposal, enactment, and ratification ==
=== Keating–Kefauver proposal ===
In 1963, Senator Kenneth Keating of New York proposed a Constitutional amendment that would have enabled Congress to enact legislation providing for how to determine when a president is unable to discharge the powers and duties of the presidency, rather than, as the Twenty-fifth Amendment does, having the Constitution so provide. This proposal was based upon a recommendation of the American Bar Association in 1960.

The text of the proposal read:

In case of the removal of the President from office or of his death or resignation, the said office shall devolve on the Vice President. In case of the inability of the President to discharge the powers and duties of the said office, the said powers and duties shall devolve on the Vice President, until the inability be removed. The Congress may by law provide for the case of removal, death, resignation or inability, both of the President and Vice President, declaring what officer shall then be President, or, in case of inability, act as President, and such officer shall be or act as President accordingly, until a President shall be elected or, in case of inability, until the inability shall be earlier removed. The commencement and termination of any inability shall be determined by such method as Congress shall by law provide.

Senators raised concerns that the Congress could either abuse such authority or neglect to enact any such legislation after the adoption of this proposal. Tennessee senator Estes Kefauver, the chairman of the Senate Judiciary Committee's Subcommittee on Constitutional Amendments, a longtime advocate for addressing the disability question, spearheaded the effort until he died in August 1963. Keating was defeated in the 1964 election, but Senator Roman Hruska of Nebraska took up Keating's cause as a new member of the Subcommittee on Constitutional Amendments.

=== Kennedy assassination ===
By the 1960s, medical advances had made it increasingly plausible that an injured or ill president might live a long time while incapacitated. The assassination of John F. Kennedy in 1963 underscored the need for a clear procedure for determining presidential disability, particularly since the new president, Lyndon B. Johnson, had once suffered a heart attack and—with the office of vice president to remain vacant until the next term began on January 20, 1965—the next two people in the line of succession were the 71-year-old speaker of the House, John W. McCormack, and the 86-year-old Senate president pro tempore, Carl Hayden. Senator Birch Bayh succeeded Kefauver as chairman of the Subcommittee on Constitutional Amendments and set about advocating a detailed amendment dealing with presidential disability.

=== Bayh–Celler proposal ===
The Twenty-fifth Amendment in the National Archives
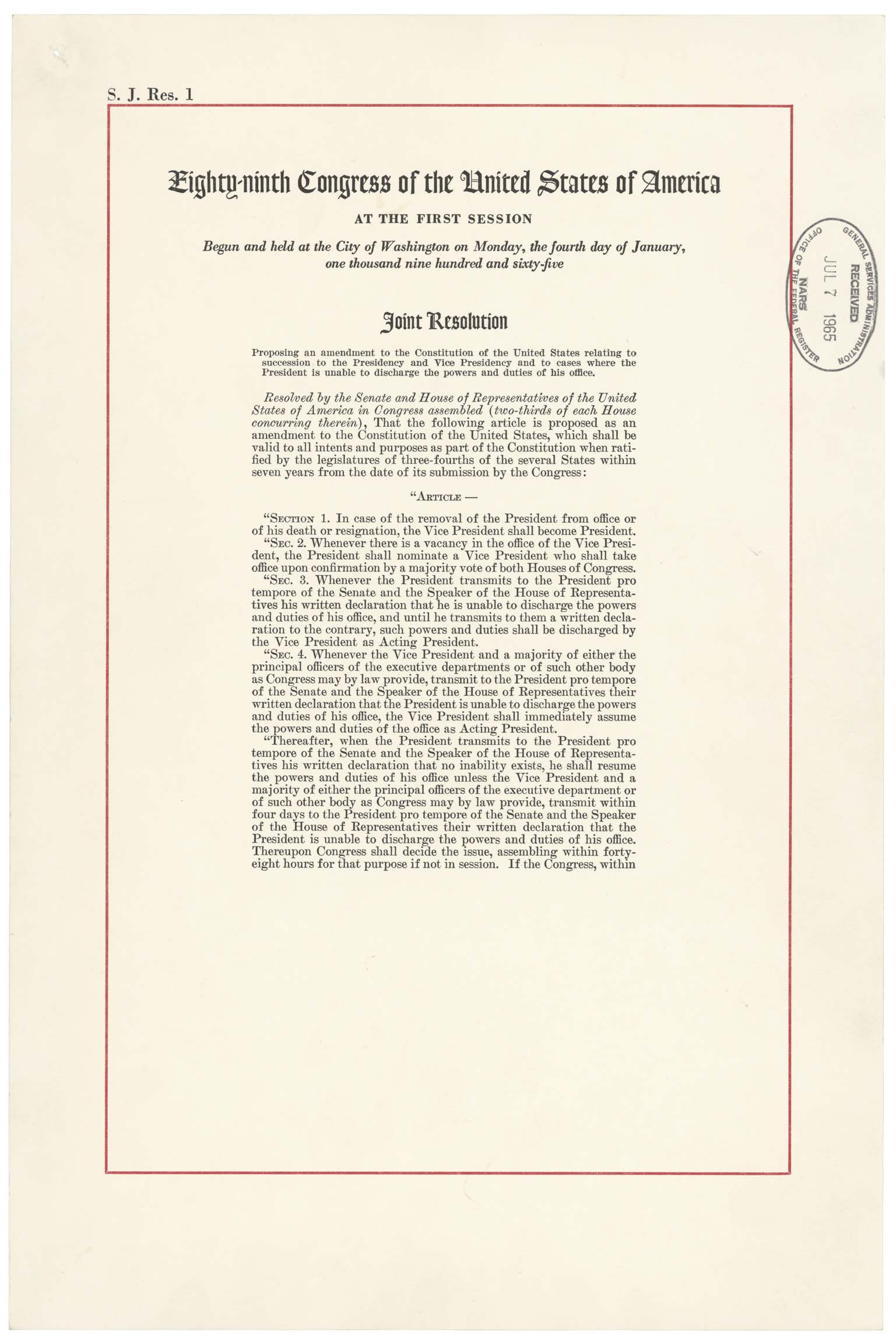
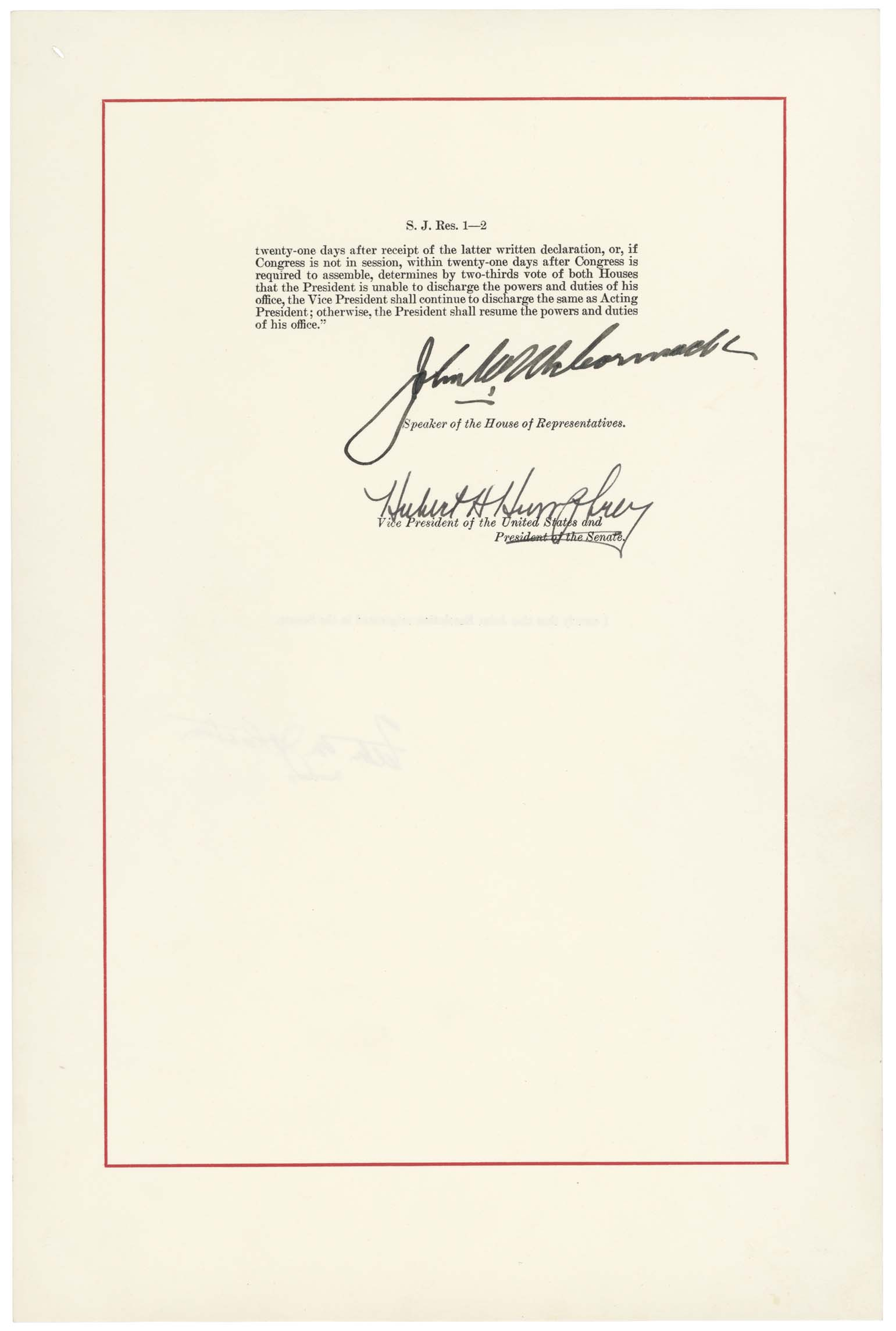

On January 6, 1965, Bayh proposed S.J. Res. 1 in the Senate and Representative Emanuel Celler (Chairman of the House Judiciary Committee) proposed H.J. Res. 1 in the House of Representatives. Their proposal specified the process by which a president could be declared "unable to discharge the powers and duties of his office", thereby making the vice president an acting president, and how the president could regain the powers of his office. Their proposal also provided a way to fill a vacancy in the office of vice president before the next presidential election.

This was as opposed to the Keating–Kefauver proposal, which provided processes neither for filling a vacancy in the office of vice president before the next presidential election nor for determining presidential disability. In 1964, the American Bar Association endorsed the type of proposal Bayh and Celler advocated. On January 28, 1965, President Johnson endorsed S.J. Res. 1 in a statement to Congress. The proposal received bipartisan support.

The Senate passed the amendment on February 19, but the House passed a different version of the amendment on April 13. On April 22 it was returned to the Senate with revisions. There were four areas of disagreement between the House and Senate versions:

- the Senate official who was to receive any written declaration under the amendment;
- the period of time during which the vice president and principal officers of the executive departments must decide whether they disagree with the president's declaration that he is fit to resume the duties of the presidency;
- the time before Congress meets to resolve the issue;
- the time limit for Congress to reach a decision.

On July 6, after a conference committee ironed out differences between the versions, the amendment's final version passed both houses of Congress and was presented to the states for ratification. (Note: On February 19, the Senate passed its version unanimously (72–0, with 28 absent on business or illness, all of whom said they would have voted "yea"). On April 13, the House passed its version 368–29 with 36 not voting (30 of the 36 coming from 15 2–1 pairs with two "yea" votes paired to one "nay" vote, unofficially 388–39). On June 30, the House agreed to the conference committee's report by unanimous consent. On July 6, the Senate agreed to the report 68–5 with 27 absent on business (seven said they would have voted "yea", eight did not say, and 12 formed four 2–1 pairs with two "yea" votes paired to one "nay" vote, unofficially 83–9).)

=== Ratification ===
Nebraska was the first state to ratify the amendment, on July 12, 1965. Ratification became complete when Nevada became the 38th state to ratify it, on February 10, 1967. (Note: The states ratified as follows: 1. Nebraska (July 12, 1965); 2. Wisconsin (July 13, 1965); 3. Oklahoma (July 16, 1965); 4. Massachusetts (August 9, 1965); 5. Pennsylvania (August 18, 1965); 6. Kentucky (September 15, 1965); 7. Arizona (September 22, 1965); 8. Michigan (October 5, 1965); 9. Indiana (October 20, 1965); 10. California (October 21, 1965); 11. Arkansas (November 4, 1965); 12. New Jersey (November 29, 1965); 13. Delaware (December 7, 1965); 14. Utah (January 17, 1966); 15. West Virginia (January 20, 1966); 16. Maine (January 24, 1966); 17. Rhode Island (January 28, 1966); 18. Colorado (February 3, 1966); 19. New Mexico (February 3, 1966); 20. Kansas (February 8, 1966); 21. Vermont (February 10, 1966); 22. Alaska (February 18, 1966); 23. Idaho (March 2, 1966); 24. Hawaii (March 3, 1966); 25. Virginia (March 8, 1966); 26. Mississippi (March 10, 1966); 27. New York (March 14, 1966); 28. Maryland (March 23, 1966); 29. Missouri (March 30, 1966); 30. New Hampshire (June 13, 1966); 31. Louisiana (July 5, 1966); 32. Tennessee (January 12, 1967); 33. Wyoming (January 25, 1967); 34. Washington (January 26, 1967); 35. Iowa (January 26, 1967); 36. Oregon (February 2, 1967); 37. Minnesota (February 10, 1967); 38. Nevada (February 10, 1967, at which point ratification was complete); 39. Connecticut (February 14, 1967); 40. Montana (February 15, 1967); 41. South Dakota (March 6, 1967); 42. Ohio (March 7, 1967); 43. Alabama (March 14, 1967); 44. North Carolina (March 22, 1967); 45. Illinois (March 22, 1967); 46. Texas (April 25, 1967); 47. Florida (May 25, 1967); The following states have not ratified: 1. Georgia; 2. North Dakota; 3. South Carolina)

When President Lyndon B. Johnson underwent planned surgery in 1965, he was unable to temporarily transfer power to Vice President Hubert H. Humphrey because the amendment's ratification remained incomplete. On February 23, 1967, at the White House ceremony certifying the ratification, Johnson said:

It was 180 years ago, in the closing days of the Constitutional Convention, that the Founding Fathers debated the question of Presidential disability. John Dickinson of Delaware asked this question: "What is the extent of the term 'disability' and who is to be the judge of it?" No one replied. It is hard to believe that until last week our Constitution provided no clear answer. Now, at last, the 25th amendment clarifies the crucial clause that provides for succession to the Presidency and for filling a Vice Presidential vacancy.

== Invocations ==
=== Sections 1 and 2: Richard Nixon, Gerald Ford, Nelson Rockefeller ===
On October 10, 1973, Vice President Spiro Agnew resigned, following a controversy over his personal taxes; two days later, President Richard Nixon nominated Representative Gerald Ford to replace Agnew as vice president pursuant to Section 2. Ford was confirmed by the Senate and the House on November 27 and December 6, respectively, and sworn in on December 6.

On August 9, 1974, Nixon resigned due to the Watergate scandal and Ford became president under Section 1, the only president never to have been elected to either the presidency or the vice presidency. The office of vice president was thus again vacant, and on August 20 Ford nominated former New York governor Nelson Rockefeller. Rockefeller was confirmed by the Senate and the House on December 10 and 19, respectively, and sworn in on December 19.

Feerick writes that the Twenty-fifth Amendment helped pave the way for Nixon's resignation during the Watergate scandal. Nixon and Agnew were Republicans, and in the months immediately after Agnew resigned, with the vice presidency empty, Nixon's removal or resignation would have transferred the presidential powers to House Speaker Carl Albert, a Democrat. But once Ford, a Republican, became vice president under Section 2, Nixon's removal became more palatable because it would not change the party holding the presidency, and therefore "the momentum for exposing the truth about Nixon's involvement in Watergate increased".

=== Section 3 ===
On December 22, 1978, President Jimmy Carter considered invoking Section 3 in advance of hemorrhoid surgery. Since then, presidents Ronald Reagan, George H. W. Bush, Bill Clinton, Barack Obama, and Donald Trump also contemplated invoking Section 3 at various times without doing so.

==== 1985: Ronald Reagan – George H. W. Bush as acting president ====
On July 12, 1985, President Reagan underwent a colonoscopy and was diagnosed with bowel cancer. He elected to have the lesion removed immediately, and consulted with White House counsel Fred F. Fielding about whether to invoke Section 3, and in particular about whether doing so would set an undesirable precedent. Fielding and White House Chief of Staff Donald Regan recommended that Reagan transfer power, and two letters were drafted: one specifically invoking Section 3, the other mentioning only that Reagan was mindful of its provisions. On July 13, Reagan signed the letter mentioning that he was mindful of Section 3 before being placed under general anesthesia for a colectomy. Vice President George H. W. Bush was acting president from 11:28 a.m. until 7:22 p.m., when Reagan transmitted a letter declaring himself able to resume his duties.

In the Fordham Law Review, Feerick asserted that although Reagan disclaimed any use of the Twenty-fifth Amendment in his letter (likely out of "fear of the reaction of the country and the world to a 'President' who admitted to being disabled, and concern ... [over] set[ting] a harmful precedent"), he followed the process set forth in Section 3. Furthermore, Feerick noted that "no constitutional provision except the Twenty-Fifth Amendment would have allowed" him to designate the vice president as acting president. Reagan later wrote in a memoir that he had, in fact, invoked the Twenty-fifth Amendment.

==== 2002 and 2007: George W. Bush – Dick Cheney as acting president ====
On June 29, 2002, President George W. Bush explicitly invoked Section 3 in temporarily transferring his powers to Vice President Dick Cheney before undergoing a colonoscopy, which began at 7:09 a.m. Bush woke about 40 minutes later, but refrained from resuming his presidential powers until 9:24 a.m. to ensure that no aftereffects remained. According to his staff, Cheney (as acting president) held his regular national security and homeland security meetings with aides at the White House, but made no appearances and took no recorded actions while acting president.

On July 21, 2007, Bush invoked Section 3 before another colonoscopy. Cheney was acting president from 7:16 a.m. to 9:21 a.m. During that time, Cheney remained at home. Neither invocation received much attention in the press.

In the view of commentator Adam Gustafson, George W. Bush's unambiguous application of Section 3 "rectified" President Reagan's "ambivalent invocation" and provided an example of a "smooth and temporary transition" under Section 3 that paved the way for future applications. The two invocations established the reasonableness of invocation for relatively minor inabilities, promoting continuity in the Executive Branch.

==== 2021: Joe Biden – Kamala Harris as acting president ====
On November 19, 2021, President Joe Biden temporarily transferred his powers and duties to Vice President Kamala Harris before undergoing a colonoscopy, making her acting president from 10:10 a.m. to 11:35 a.m. This is the first time a woman held the powers and duties of the president of the United States.

== Considered invocations of Section 4 ==
=== 1981: Reagan assassination attempt ===
Draft Section 3 letter prepared (though never signed) after Ronald Reagan was shot on March 30, 1981

Draft Section 4 letter prepared (though never signed) after Ronald Reagan was shot on March 30, 1981

After the attempted assassination of Ronald Reagan on March 30, 1981, Vice President George H. W. Bush did not assume the presidential powers and duties as acting president. Reagan had been rushed into surgery with no opportunity to invoke Section 3; Bush did not invoke Section 4 because he was on a plane at the time of the shooting, and Reagan was out of surgery by the time Bush landed in Washington.

In 1995, Birch Bayh, the primary sponsor of the amendment in the Senate, wrote that Section 4 should have been invoked. Physician to the President Daniel Ruge, who supervised Reagan's treatment immediately after the shooting, said he had erred by not having Reagan invoke Section 3 because Reagan needed general anesthesia and was in an intensive care unit.

=== 2021: Trump and the Capitol attack ===
After the January 6 United States Capitol attack, President Donald Trump was accused of having incited the incident, and by evening some of his Cabinet members were reportedly considering trying to get Vice President Mike Pence to agree to invoke Section 4. According to multiple sources, House Speaker Nancy Pelosi was reluctant to impeach Trump a second time and, as an alternative disciplinary measure, asked Pence to agree to invoke the 25th Amendment in early 2021. Pence refused in a public letter to Pelosi urging her and Congress to "avoid actions that would further divide and inflame the passions of the moment", and said the 25th Amendment was for incapacity, not discipline. Hours later, the House of Representatives voted on a non-binding resolution formally urging Pence to use the 25th Amendment to immediately remove the powers of the presidency from Trump. The resolution passed 223-205, with Adam Kinzinger as the sole Republican voting for it.

=== 2026: Trump and the 2026 Iran war ===
In April 2026, the Twenty-fifth Amendment was the subject of renewed political discussion during the 2026 Iran war after President Trump posted, "A whole civilization will die tonight, never to be brought back again". Despite the subsequent announcement of a two-week ceasefire, calls for the amendment's invocation continued.

According to media reports, over 50 House Democrats called for invoking the amendment after Trump issued threats and reported military actions related to Iranian targets. Political figures including Hakeem Jeffries and Marjorie Taylor Greene publicly criticized Trump's reactions, expressing concern about escalation and questioning the president's judgment and decision-making.

Coverage of the issue also emphasized that the Twenty-fifth Amendment establishes a constitutional mechanism for transferring or removing presidential power in cases of incapacity, though it has never been invoked in practice and remains politically controversial. Analysts noted that any attempt to invoke the amendment would face significant procedural and political obstacles, requiring the support of the vice president and a majority of the Cabinet.

== See also ==
- Acting President of the United States
