= John Feerick =

American lawyer

John D. Feerick
- Born: July 12, 1936 (age 90)
- Education: Fordham University
- Occupation: Law professor
- Employer: Fordham University School of Law
- Organization: Feerick Center for Social Justice
- Known for: The 25th Amendment on U.S. presidential succession
- Notable work: The Twenty-Fifth Amendment: Its Complete History and Earliest Applications
- Title: Dean, Fordham University School of Law
- Term: 1982–2002
- Successor: William Treanor

John D. Feerick (born July 12, 1936) is a law professor at Fordham University School of Law in New York City. He served as the school's eighth dean from 1982 to 2002. From 2002 to 2004, he was the Leonard F. Manning Professor of Law at Fordham, and in 2004 was named to the Sidney C. Norris Chair of Law in Public Service.

== Biography ==
Prior to entering academia in 1982, Feerick was a labor and employment attorney in the law firm of Skadden, Arps, Slate, Meagher & Flom. He joined the firm in 1961 and became a partner in 1968.

Feerick has served in numerous appointed public positions. From 1987-1990, he was chair of the New York State Commission on Government Integrity. In 2003, he served on the referee panel in the Campaign for Fiscal Equity v. State of New York school funding case. He also chaired the New York State Commission to Promote Public Confidence in Judicial Elections, which sought to reform the nomination, campaigning, election, and retention of state judges in the wake of such scandals as the bribery investigation of former judge Gerald P. Garson. From 2003 to 2005, Feerick served on the special master panel in the McCain v. Bloomberg homeless rights litigation. He has also been a member of the New York State Law Revision Commission, the New York State Judicial Salary Commission, the New York State Committee to Promote Public Trust and Confidence in the Legal System, the New York State Mandatory Continuing Legal Education Committee, and the Chief Judge Judith Kaye's Corporate Advisory Group.

On April 16, 2007, Feerick was appointed by Governor Eliot Spitzer to head the newly formed Commission on Public Integrity, which will be formed from the Ethics Committee and the State Commission on Lobbying.

In addition, Feerick has also chaired the Ethics Committee of the Dispute Resolution Section of the American Bar Association. From 1987-1999, he was president of the Citizens Union Foundation. From 1992-1994, he was president of the New York City Bar Association. He has also been president of the American Arbitration Association and still serves as an honorary board member. As a mediator, Feerick played a role in several high-profile labor disputes including the 1994 New York City Transit contract negotiations and the National Football League salary cap.

Feerick is Director of the Feerick Center for Social Justice and Dispute Resolution at Fordham Law School.

Feerick graduated in 1958 from Fordham University and obtained his law degree from Fordham Law School in 1961. During his time in law school, he served as Editor-in-Chief of the Fordham Law Review. He is the recipient of many awards, including the Law and Society Award from the New York Lawyers for the Public Interest, the 1999 Citizen Achievement Award from the New York State League of Women Voters, the American Irish Historical Society Gold Medal, and the New York State Bar Association Gold Medal.

Feerick was primarily responsible for the composition of the 25th Amendment to the United States Constitution. This amendment specifies how a president can remove himself from office temporarily or be removed from office by the Vice President with a majority of the Cabinet, and the process that follows for the President to attempt to regain power before Congress, if he so chooses, and then how the Vice President with the President's Cabinet, once again, can remove him from power.
