= Fordham University School of Law =

Private law school in Manhattan, New York, US

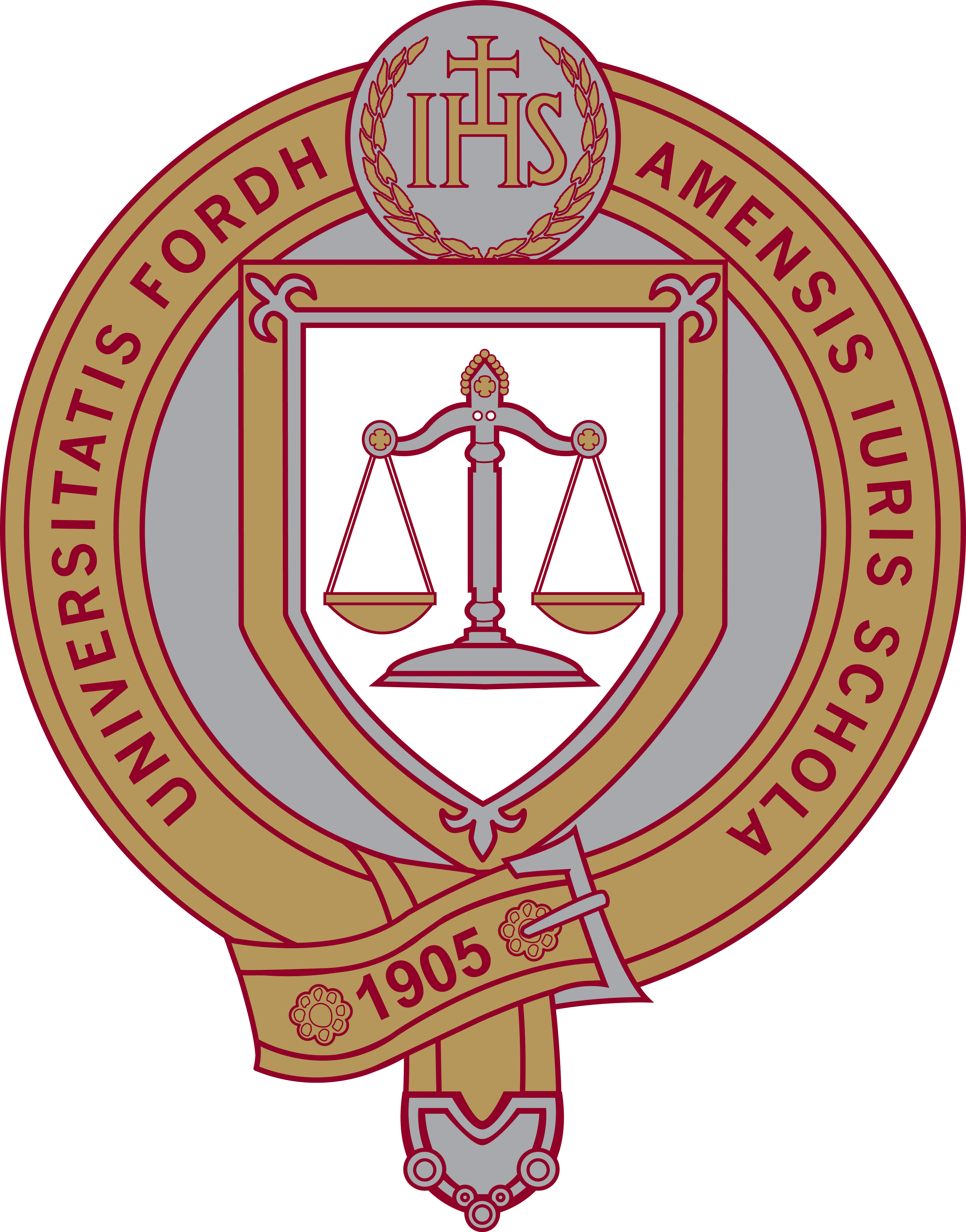
- Seal of Fordham University School of Law
- Motto: In the Service of Others
- Parent school: Fordham University
- Religious affiliation: Catholic Society of Jesus
- Established: September 28, 1905; 121 years ago
- School type: Private law school
- Dean: Joseph Landau
- Location: New York City, New York, United States; 40°46′17″N 73°59′06″W
- USNWR ranking: 42th (tie) (2026)
- Bar pass rate: 92.98% (2024 first-time takers)
- Website: www.fordham.edu/school-of-law/

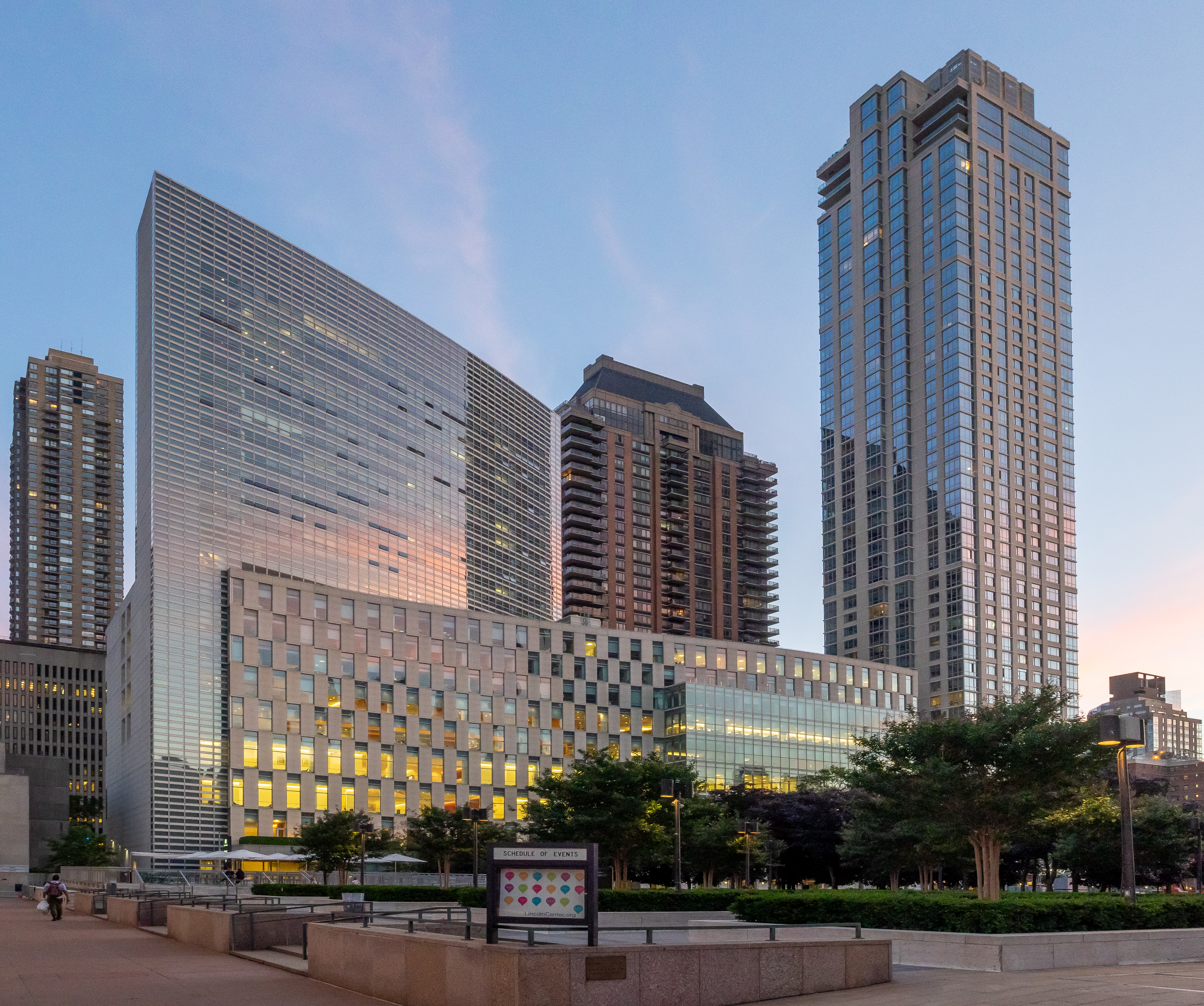
New Fordham Law School

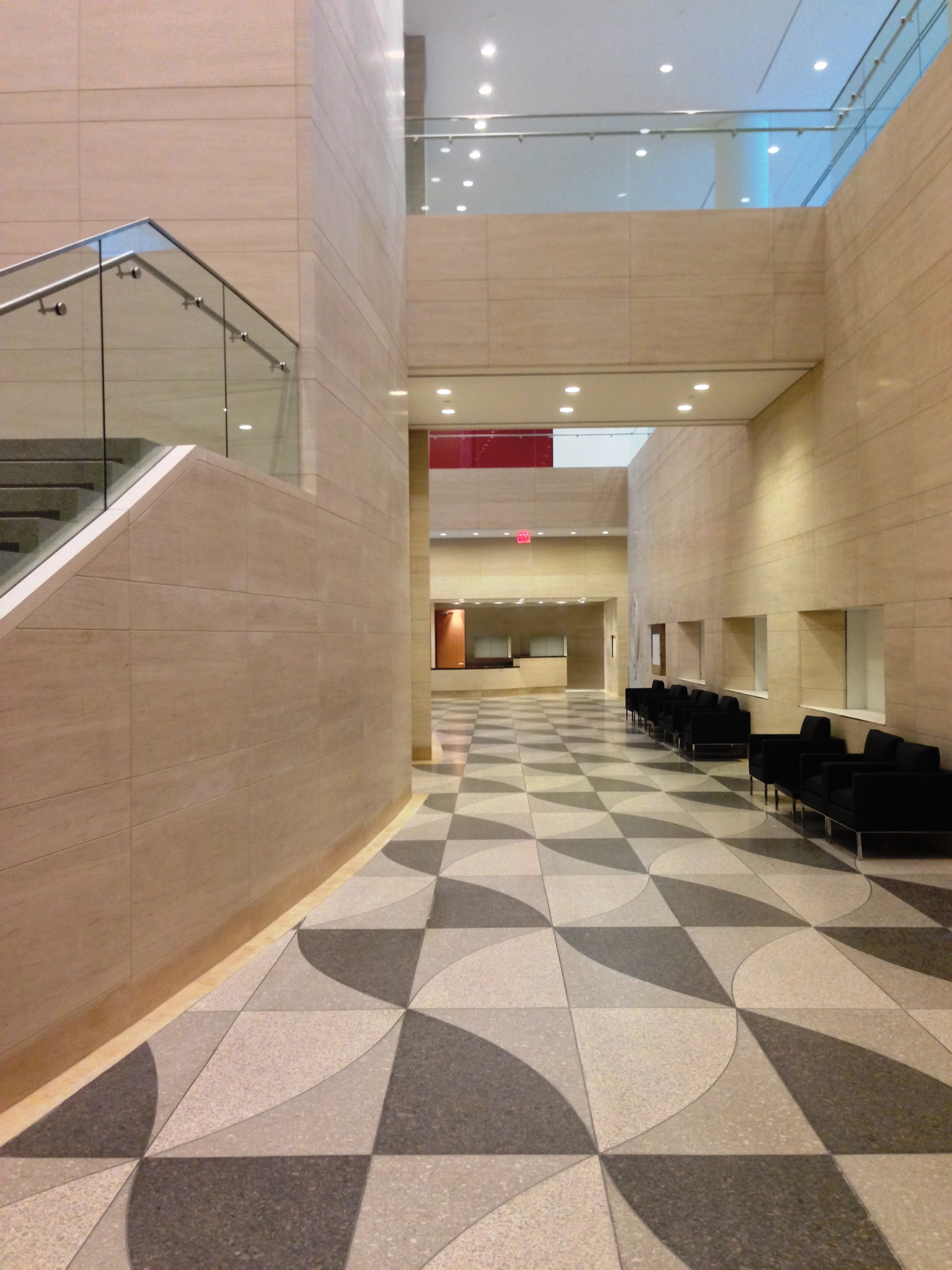
Law school lobby

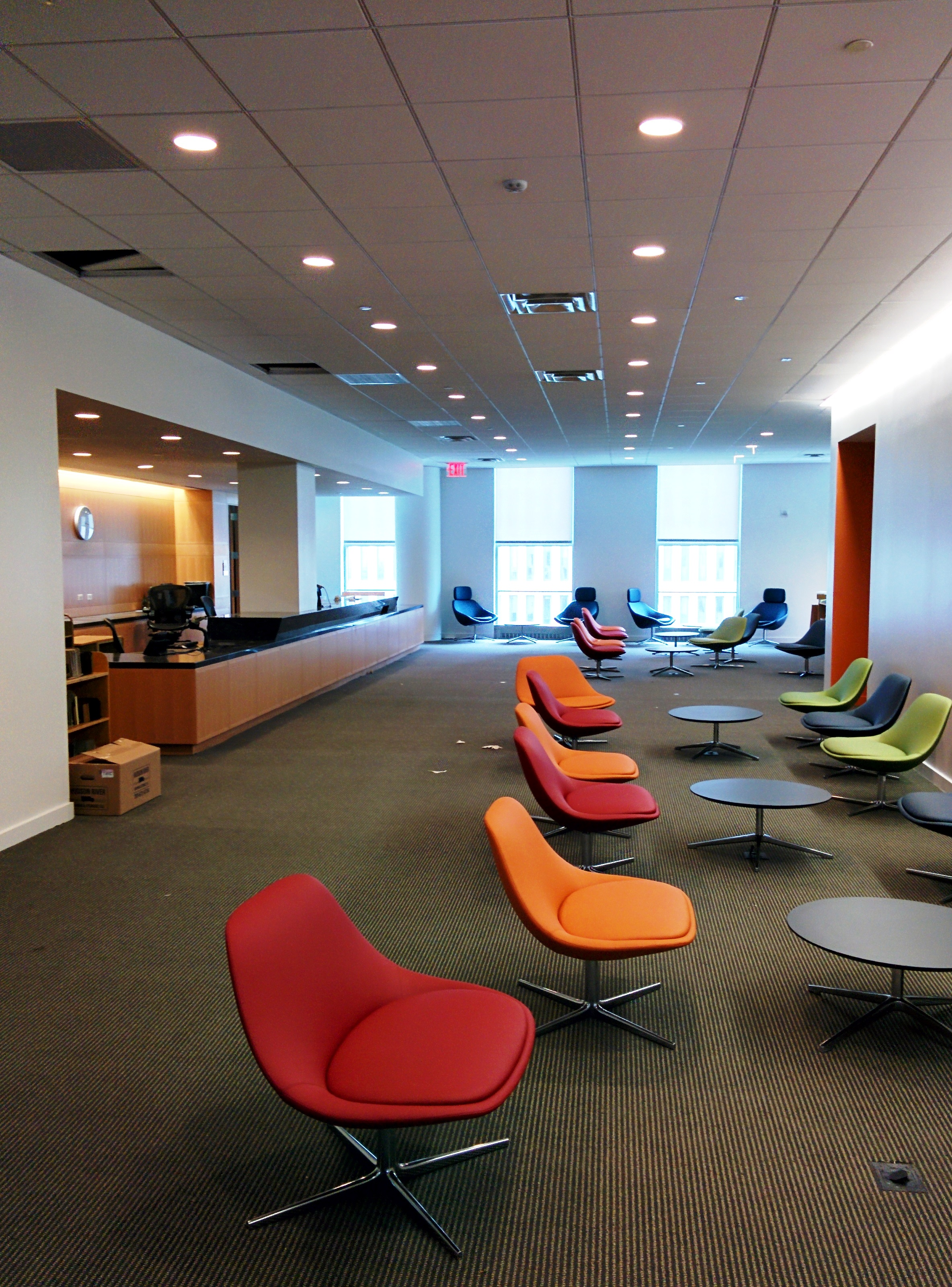
Fordham Law library entrance

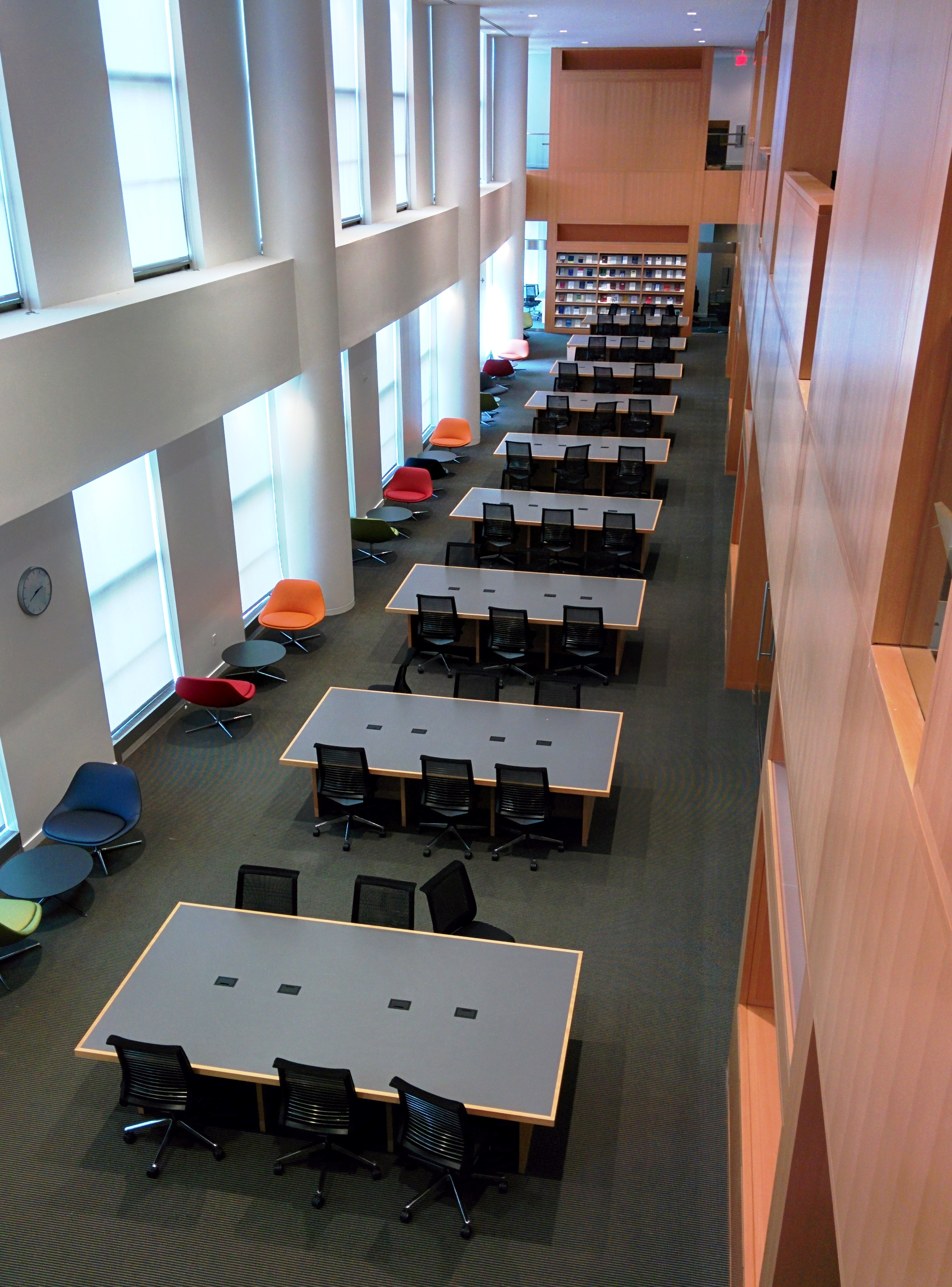
Fordham Law library reading room

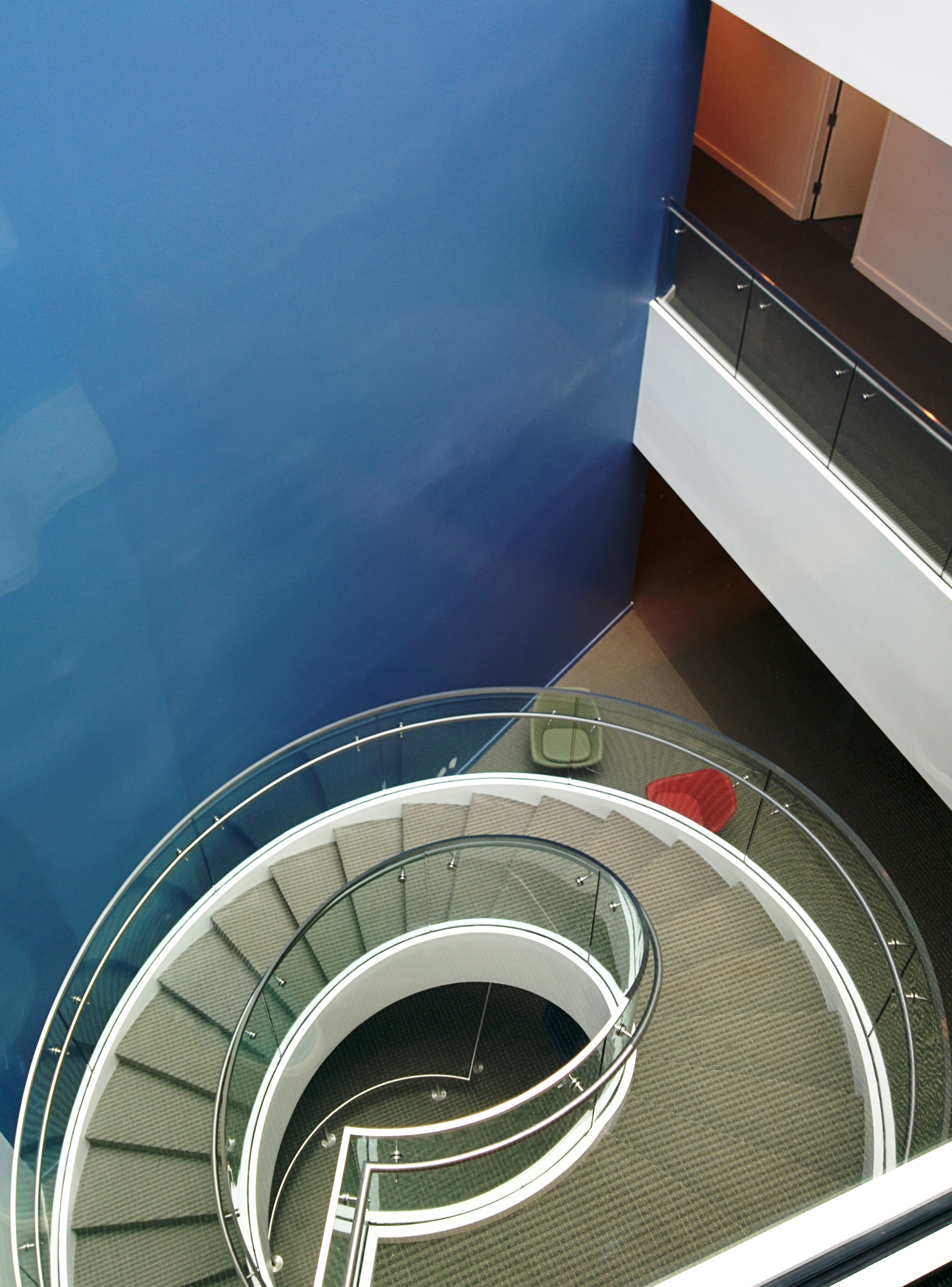
Fordham Law faculty stairs

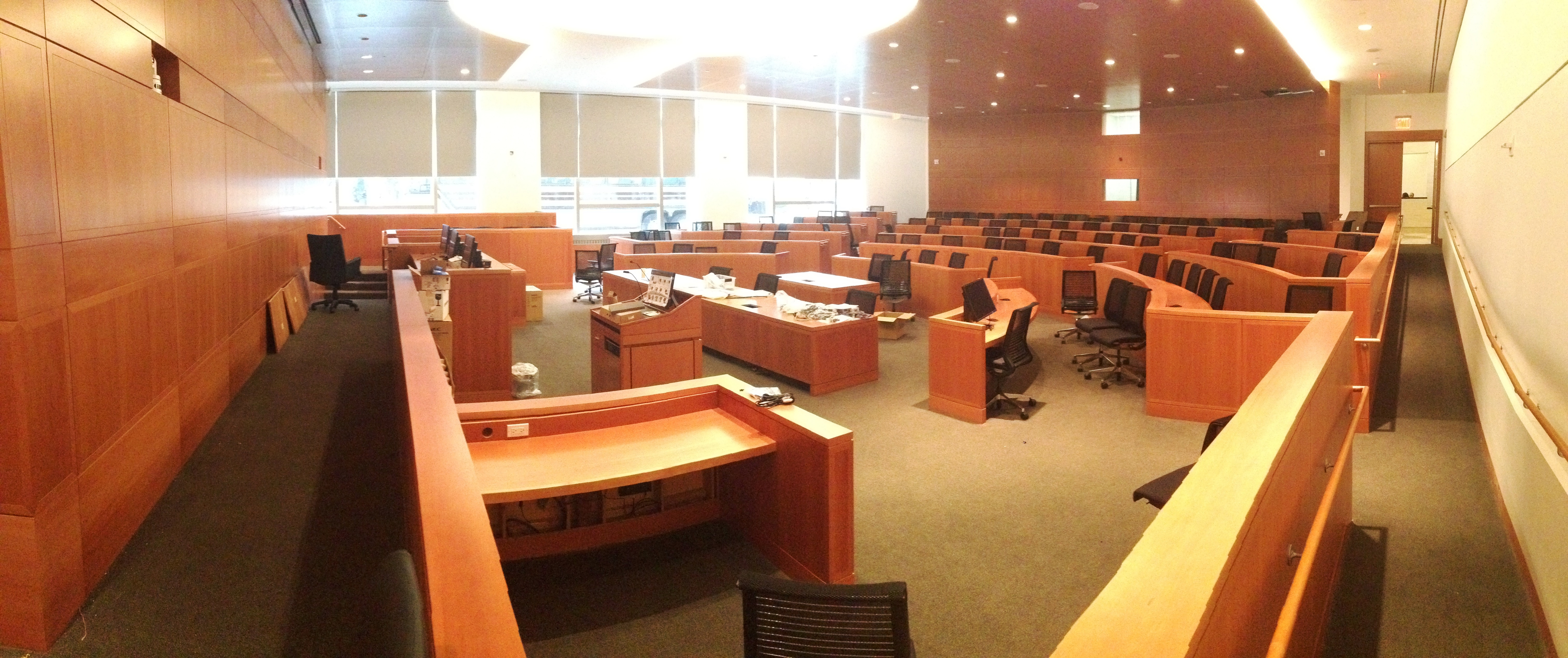
New Fordham Law moot court

The Fordham University School of Law is the law school of Fordham University. The school is located in Manhattan and is one of the eight ABA-accredited law schools in New York City. According to the school's ABA-required disclosures, 88.12% of 2023 graduates obtained full-time, long-term, JD-required employment (i.e. as attorneys) nine months after graduation.

== Overview ==
1,335 J.D. students attend Fordham Law. Fordham Law also offers Master of Laws (LL.M.) degrees in the following specializations: Banking, Corporate, & Finance Law; Corporate Compliance; Fashion Law; Intellectual Property & Information Technology Law; International Business & Trade Law; International Dispute Resolution; International Law & Justice; and U.S. Law. LL.M. students can take a second concentration after finishing the first one by enrolling in a third semester. Fordham University offers a "3-3 Program" that allows students to earn a Bachelor of Arts or Bachelor of Science and a Juris Doctor in six years of study: three at Fordham College and three at Fordham Law. Fordham Law offers three joint degrees in conjunction with Fordham University's other graduate schools: J.D./M.A. in International Political Economy and Development; J.D./M.B.A.; and J.D./M.S.W.

The School also offers a Master of Studies in Law (M.S.L.) degree with specializations in Corporate Compliance and Fashion Law, and a Doctor of Juridical Science (S.J.D.) degree, which is research-based and culminates in a dissertation of at least 50,000 words.

Founded in 1905, Fordham Law commemorated its Centennial during the 2005–06 academic year, and capped the year-long celebration with an alumni gala on Ellis Island on September 28, the school's official birthday. $20 million was fundraised and six new academic chairs created.

The dean of Fordham Law School is Joseph Landau.

== Statistics ==
For the class entering in 2023, 21.13% of applicants to Fordham Law were accepted. Of those accepted 32.14% enrolled. The average full time Fordham Law student had a LSAT score of 167 and an undergraduate GPA of 3.75, while the average part-time student had a LSAT score of 164 and an undergraduate GPA of 3.58.

In the 2024 edition of U.S. News & World Report's "Best Graduate Schools", Fordham Law was ranked tied for 33rd. It has the highest ranked part-time law program in New York state (ranked 2nd in the nation in the 2021 edition.) Additionally, five specialty programs were nationally ranked: Dispute Resolution, 13th; Trial Advocacy, 13th; International Law, 15th; Intellectual Property, 16th; and Clinical Training, 22nd.

In 2020, The National Law Journal ranked Fordham Law 4th nationally in terms of placement of 2018 graduates in the 25 largest law firms of the largest legal market, which is New York. It is placed 15th nationally in terms of placement of 2018 graduates in top 100 law firms. This is an improvement from four years earlier when it ranked 20th and 23rd in comparative rankings. In a survey conducted by Vault in 2017, Fordham Law comes 8th in terms of big law placement and 9th when class size was factored in.

In 2020, PublicLegal placed Fordham Law among the top 23 law schools for the highest median salaries along with Harvard, Yale, Columbia, Chicago, NYU, UC-Berkeley, Duke, Cornell, UPenn, Georgetown and 12 others.

== Campus ==
Originally located in New York's downtown Financial District, Fordham Law is currently located in Lincoln Square, Manhattan, as part of Fordham University's Lincoln Center campus. As part of the university's Lincoln Center Master Plan, unveiled in 2005, a new law school building was built. After groundbreaking on February 3, 2011, the building was completed in four years, opening September 18, 2014. The new law school building is part of the university's phase 1 redevelopment of its Lincoln Center campus.

The 22-story building was designed by Pei Cobb Freed & Partners to serve a dual-purpose for Fordham University: a nine-story pedestal (and lower-level floor) houses the law school, and a 12-story tower serves as an undergraduate residence hall.

The law school portion of the building was dedicated on September 18, 2014. Former New York City mayor Michael R. Bloomberg delivered the keynote address and U.S. Supreme Court Associate Justice Sonia Sotomayor also gave a speech before presiding over the ribbon-cutting ceremony.

== Academics ==
=== Clinical Education ===
The Clinical education program at Fordham Law is ranked 22nd nationally by U.S. News & World Report in its 2016 edition of America's Best Graduate Schools. At Fordham, clinical education is available but not required. Students are selected for clinics via a competitive application process. Fordham students have an opportunity to enroll in clinics following their first year, and after taking the Fundamental Lawyering Skills course. Currently, 17 clinics are offered:

- Appellate Litigation
- Community Economic Development
- Consumer Litigation
- Corporate Social Responsibility
- Criminal Defense
- Entrepreneurial Law
- Family Advocacy
- Federal Litigation
- Immigrant Rights
- International Human Rights
- International Law & Development in Africa
- Legislative and Policy Advocacy
- Mediation
- Queens DA Prosecution
- Presidential Succession
- Samuelson-Glushko Intellectual Property and Information Law
- Securities Litigation & Arbitration
- Tax

Fordham's clinics represent clients as "Lincoln Square Legal Services," a small law firm housed within the school.

=== Leitner Center ===
The Leitner Center for International Law and Justice works with students and with social justice organizations both locally and internationally to advocate for human rights.

=== Public Interest Resource Center ===
Fordham's Public Interest Resource Center (PIRC) serves as the clearinghouse for student community service and pro bono work, and hosts 19 student-run organizations, including Habitat for Humanity, Unemployment Action Center, Just Democracy, and others. PIRC earned Fordham Law the American Bar Association's 2008 Pro Bono Publico Award, making Fordham Law only the second university winner in the award's history.

== Student publications ==
Students at Fordham Law publish six nationally recognized law journals. According to a study by Washington & Lee University, among journals published 2007–2014, they are ranked among the most cited in judicial opinions as follows:

- Fordham Law Review
  - 6th-most cited among all law journals
- Fordham Intellectual Property, Media & Entertainment Law Journal
  - 6th-most cited of all IP journals
- Fordham Urban Law Journal
  - 5th-most cited student-edited public policy journal
- Fordham Journal of Corporate & Financial Law
  - 1st-most cited student-edited banking and finance journal

In addition, the study found that four of Fordham Law School's specialty law reviews are among the top ten most cited journals by law reviews in their respective specialty fields.

- Fordham Environmental Law Review
  - 10th-most cited of all environmental law journals
- Fordham Urban Law Journal
  - 2nd-most cited of all public policy journals
- Fordham Journal of Corporate & Financial Law
  - 1st-most cited among all banking and finance journals
- Fordham Intellectual Property, Media & Entertainment Law Journal
  - 3rd-most cited of all IP journals
- Fordham International Law Journal
  - 4th-most cited among student-edited international journals

== Notable faculty ==
Notable faculty include Matthew Diller, Toni Jaeger-Fine, Rebecca Kysar, John D. Feerick, Joseph Landau, Ethan Lieb, John Pfaff, Olivier Sylvain, Steve Thel, and Zephyr Teachout. Visiting and adjunct professors include federal appeals judge Denny Chin, Jewish law scholar Daniel Sinclair, and election law experts Jurij Toplak and Jerry Goldfeder.

== Notable alumni ==
Numerous notable attorneys, judges, prosecutors, politicians, and diplomats are among the notable Fordham Law graduates, including Chief Judge of the United States Court of Appeals for the Second Circuit Irving Kaufman, and Denny Chin, a current U.S. Court of Appeals for the Second Circuit judge.

Over 650 judges are Fordham Law graduates.

In 1924, Ruth Whitehead Whaley graduated, at the top of her class, who later became the first African-American woman admitted to the state bars of New York and North Carolina.

Criminal defense attorney Brian Steel, a Fordham Law graduate, gained notoriety during the 2022 YSL Records racketeering trial as the lead attorney representing rapper Jeffery "Young Thug" Williams. The YSL trial is currently the longest trial in Georgia state history, having lasted 22 months. Steel's notoriety increased as courtroom recordings during the trial, including ones in which he is seen attempting to state that the "Thug" in his client's rapper name is an acronym for "truly humble under God", became internet memes. In April 2025, Steel requested to join the trial team of music executive Sean "P Diddy" Combs for his federal sex trafficking criminal case. In July 2025, Combs was acquitted on the 3 most severe charges out of 5, reportedly due in part to the work of Steel.

Governor of New York Malcolm Wilson, New York City Mayor Vincent R. Impellitteri, and United States Attorney General John N. Mitchell are Fordham Law graduates. Ten members of the U.S. House of Representatives are Fordham Law graduates including Thomas Suozzi, Thomas Vincent Quinn, Bill Owens, Jerrold Nadler, Vito Fossella, Geraldine Ferraro, Francis E. Dorn, Dan Donovan, and Steven Derounian.

Among the sports personalities were World Light Heavyweight champion Bob Olin, New York Giants President John Mara, General Manager of the Philadelphia Eagles Howie Roseman, and Walter O'Malley, owner of the Brooklyn Dodgers who moved the team from Brooklyn to Los Angeles.

== In popular culture ==
- George Clooney's title character in the film Michael Clayton (2007) is a graduate of Fordham Law.
- Peter Scanavino's character Detective Dominick Carisi in Law and Order: Special Victims Unit attended Fordham Law School's night classes, passed his bar exam in 2016, and became a District Attorney.
- In 2022, Kelli Giddish's character Amanda Rollins in Law and Order quits the detective work and becomes a professor at Fordham Law.
- Jamie Fox’s ADA Character in Above the Law was a Fordham Law graduate.
- The Character Erin Reagan from Blue Bloods plays a NYC ADA who went to Fordham Law
- In the comedy series Spin City, Michael J Fox’s character is the Deputy Mayor of NYC who went to Fordham College and Law.
- In the 2025 Netflix movie Zero Day, Robert D’Niro plays a former U.S. president who went to Fordham Law as seen on his wearing a Fordham sweatshirt while jogging.

== Employment ==
According to Fordham Law's official 2014 ABA-required disclosures, 80% of the Class of 2014 were employed full-time 10 months after graduation; 67.8% were in full-time, long-term, JD-required positions; 11.1% held positions the ABA classifies as "J.D. Advantage" (defined by NALP as "legal training is deemed to be an advantage or even necessary in the workplace"); and 20.7% were employed in public sector positions in government, nonprofit organizations, and judicial clerkships. Fordham Law's Law School Transparency under-employment score is 20.3%, indicating the percentage of the Class of 2014 unemployed, pursuing an additional degree, or working in a non-professional, short-term, or part-time job nine months after graduation.

ABA Employment Summary for 2014 Graduates
| Employment Status | Percentage |
| Employed - Bar Passage Required (Full-Time, Long-Term) | 67.76% |
| Employed - Bar Passage Required (Part-Time and/or Short-Term) | 6.9% |
| Employed - J.D. Advantage | 11.11% |
| Employed - Professional Position | 2.61% |
| Employed - Non-Professional Position | 0.0% |
| Employed - Undeterminable | 0.0% |
| Pursuing Graduate Degree Full Time | 1.31% |
| Unemployed - Start Date Deferred | 1.53% |
| Unemployed - Not Seeking | 1.31% |
| Unemployed - Seeking | 6.97% |
| Employment Status Unknown | 0.44% |
Total of 459 Graduates

The law school was ranked # 21 of all law schools nationwide by the National Law Journal in terms of sending the highest percentage of 2015 graduates to the largest 100 law firms in the US (19.5%).

== Costs ==
The 2015-2016 tuition at Fordham Law is $53,440 for full-time J.D. students and $40,080 for part-time J.D. students; the estimated fees, room and board, and other expenses total $27,996 for full-time and $27,906 for part-time students (not including a $2,529 student health insurance charge, which the school will waive for students who have alternative health insurance coverage). The Law School Transparency estimated debt-financed cost of attendance for three years is $296,077.

== See also ==
- Law of New York
- Law school in the United States
