= Unemployment Action Center =

New York-based law organization

The Unemployment Action Center, sometimes abbreviated as UAC, is a non-profit organization run by students of nine law schools in the New York City area. The purpose of UAC is to provide free legal representation to people who were denied unemployment benefits by the New York State Department of Labor, or against appeals by employers from an initial determination granting unemployment insurance.

== History ==
UAC was founded in 1981 as a clinical program at New York University School of Law and now adds over 100 participants each year. Law student volunteers have represented thousands of claimants, and contribute their efforts without compensation.

In 1985, The UAC was incorporated as a non-profit organization.

== Participating law schools ==
(in alphabetical order)

- Brooklyn Law School
- Cardozo School of Law, part of Yeshiva University
- Columbia Law School, part of Columbia University
- Fordham University School of Law, part of Fordham University
- Hofstra University School of Law, part of Hofstra University
- New York Law School
- New York University School of Law, part of New York University
- Pace University School of Law
- Touro Law School

== Similar organizations ==
The University of Connecticut School of Law has a center modeled on the New York example that was established in 2002.
