= Fordham Law Review =

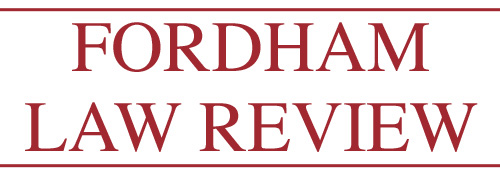
- Discipline: Law
- Language: English

Publication details
- History: 1914–1917, 1935–present
- Publisher: Fordham Law School (United States)
- Frequency: Bimonthly

Standard abbreviations
- Bluebook: Fordham L. Rev.
- ISO 4: Fordham Law Rev.

Indexing
- ISSN: 0015-704X
- LCCN: 97660501
- OCLC no.: 1569695

Links
- Journal homepage; Online archives

The Fordham Law Review is a student-run law journal and honor society associated with the Fordham University School of Law that covers a wide range of legal scholarship.

== Overview ==
In 2024, the Fordham Law Review was the twelfth-most cited law journal by other journals and the twelfth-most cited by courts. It ranked twentieth overall in Washington and Lee University School of Law's 2025 study of law journal rankings. The journal's content consists generally of academic articles, symposia, and student-written notes. The editor-in-chief for the 2025–2026 year is Devon Brostoff.

The journal publishes six issues per year, or three per semester.

== History ==
The Fordham Law Review was established in 1914 at the Fordham University School of Law. However, it suspended publication after only three years following the United States' entry into World War I. The final issue before suspension provided a brief explanatory statement:

Owing to the war, the Review will close this year with this number. Some of the Board of Editors are in military service, with national and state organizations. Others are at the training camps for reserve officers.

The journal did not restart publication until 1935 amidst the Great Depression. Soon thereafter, it garnered attention for its publication of Fordham Law School Dean Ignatius M. Wilkinson's testimony before the Senate Judiciary Committee condemning Franklin D. Roosevelt's Judiciary Reorganization Bill of 1937. Wilkinson's testimony, published in the May 1937 edition of the journal, warned Congress that the President's plan "reaches down to and shakes the foundations of our constitutional structure."

In 2011, the journal launched the Fordham Law Review Online. The Fordham Law Review Online provides a forum for responses to articles published in the regular journal and to comment on contemporary legal issues. In addition to traditional written content, the website also includes online-only symposia and recorded or transcribed lectures. Articles published in the Fordham Law Review Online are available on the journal's website and on Digital Commons.

== Membership ==
The journal is managed by a board of up to 22 student editors. It selects approximately 80 student staff, members, and associate editors each year to assist with production. Membership on the Fordham Law Review is open to all first-year Fordham law students and transfer students. The journal offers positions to approximately 20 students on the basis of first-year grades and 45 students on the basis of their submissions to a writing competition and personal statements.

== Notable alumni ==
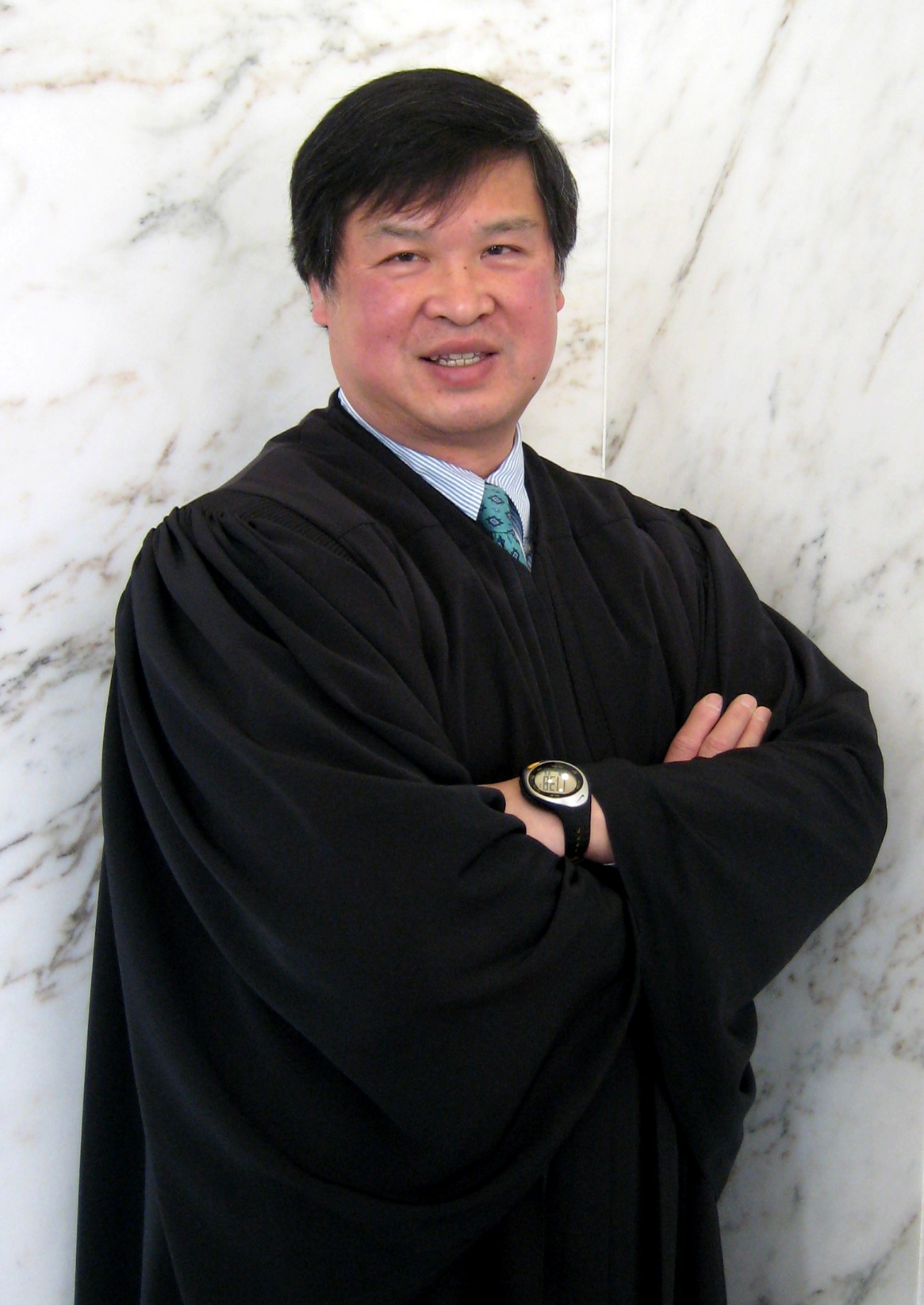
Judge Denny Chin

- Alessandra Biaggi, New York State Senator
- Vincent L. Briccetti, US District Judge, Southern District of New York
- Denny Chin, US Circuit Judge, Second Circuit
- Robert J. Corcoran, Justice of the Arizona Supreme Court
- Jeffery Deaver, writer
- Steven B. Derounian, US Congressman and New York State Judge
- Daniel M. Donovan, Jr., Staten Island District Attorney
- Claire Eagan, US District Judge, Northern District of Oklahoma
- John Feerick, dean of Fordham Law School and author of the 25th Amendment to the US Constitution
- Denis Reagan Hurley, US District Judge, Eastern District of New York
- G. Gordon Liddy, FBI agent, lawyer, talk show host, actor, and figure in the Watergate scandal
- Joseph M. McLaughlin, US Circuit Judge, Second Circuit
- William Hughes Mulligan, US Circuit Judge, Second Circuit
- Lawrence W. Pierce, US Circuit Judge, Second Circuit
- Mario Procaccino, New York City Comptroller and mayoral candidate
- Cathy Seibel, US District Judge, Southern District of New York

== Notable articles ==
- Deborah W. Denno, The Lethal Injection Quandary: How Medicine Has Dismantled the Death Penalty, 76 Fordham L. Rev. 49 (2007).
- Harold Hongju Koh, A World Drowning in Guns, 71 Fordham L. Rev. 2333 (2003).
- Constantine N. Katsoris, The Arbitration of a Public Securities Dispute, 53 Fordham L. Rev. 279 (1984).
- Comment, DES and a Proposed Theory of Enterprise Liability, 46 Fordham L. Rev. 963 (1978).
- Warren E. Burger, Are Specialized Training and Certification of Advocates Essential to Our System of Justice?, 42 Fordham L. Rev. 227 (1973).
- John Feerick, The Proposed Twenty-Fifth Amendment to the Constitution, 34 Fordham L. Rev. 173 (1965).
- Comment, Tortious Acts as a Basis for Jurisdiction in Products Liability Cases, 33 Fordham L. Rev. 671 (1965).
- Ignatius N. Wilkinson, The President's Plan Respecting the Supreme Court, 6 Fordham L. Rev. 179 (1937).
- Michael A. Woronoff & Jonathan A. Rosen, Understanding Anti-Dilution Provisions in Convertible Securities, 74 Fordham L. Rev. 129 (2007).
