= Posterior cortical atrophy =

- Other names: Biparietal Alzheimer disease
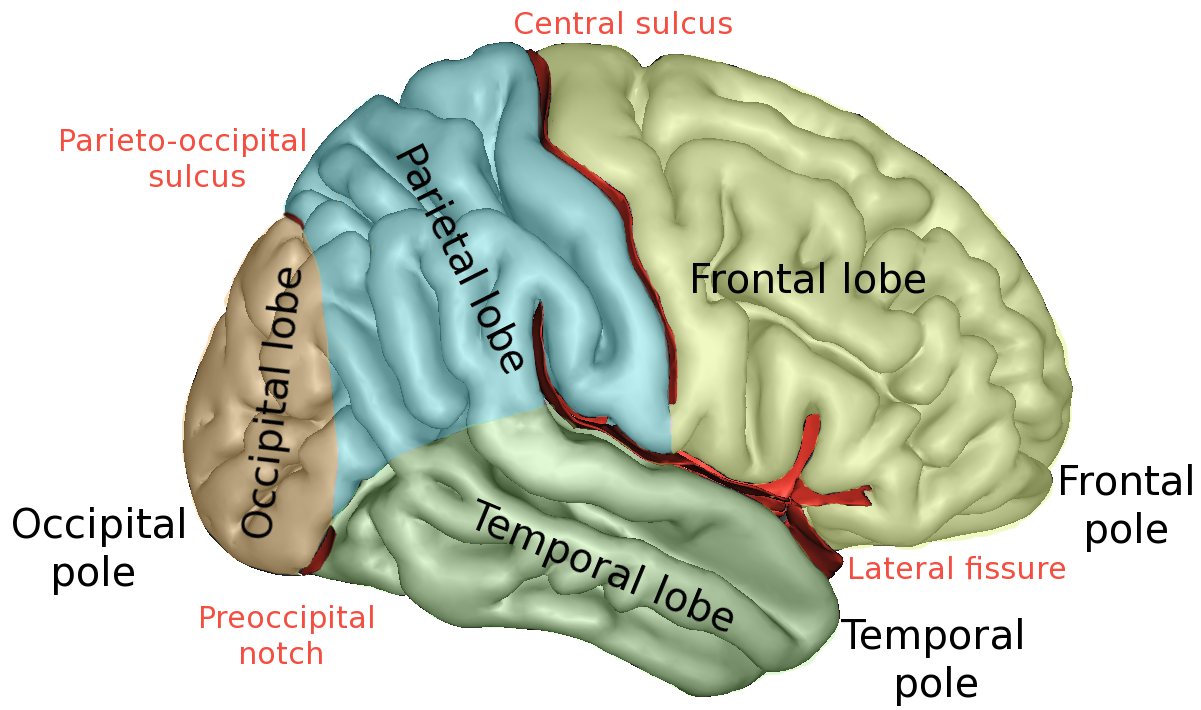
- Lobes of the human brain
- Specialty: Neurology

Posterior cortical atrophy (PCA), also called Benson's syndrome, is a rare form of dementia which is considered a visual variant or an atypical variant of Alzheimer's disease (AD). The disease causes atrophy of the posterior part of the cerebral cortex, resulting in the progressive disruption of complex visual processing. PCA was first described by D. Frank Benson in 1988.

PCA usually affects people at an earlier age than typical cases of Alzheimer's disease, with initial symptoms often experienced in people in their mid-fifties or early sixties. This was the case with writer Terry Pratchett (1948–2015), who went public in 2007 about being diagnosed with PCA. In rare cases, PCA can be caused by dementia with Lewy bodies and Creutzfeldt–Jakob disease.

== Symptoms ==
The main symptom resulting from posterior cortical atrophy is a decrease in visuospatial and visuoperceptual capabilities, since the area of atrophy involves the occipital lobe responsible for visual processing. The atrophy is progressive; early symptoms include difficulty reading, blurred vision, light sensitivity, issues with depth perception, and trouble navigating through space. Additional symptoms include apraxia, a disorder of movement planning, alexia, an impaired ability to read, and visual agnosia, an object recognition disorder. In the two-streams hypothesis, damage to the ventral, or "what" stream, of the visual system, located in the temporal lobe, leads to the symptoms related to general vision and object recognition deficits; damage to the dorsal, or "where/how" stream, located in the parietal lobe, leads to PCA symptoms related to impaired movements in response to visual stimuli, such as navigation and apraxia.

The dorsal stream (green) runs through the parietal lobe, and the ventral stream (purple) runs through the temporal lobe. Both streams originate in the occipital lobe (blue) located posteriorly.

As neurodegeneration spreads, more severe symptoms emerge, including the inability to recognize familiar people and objects, trouble navigating familiar places, and sometimes visual hallucinations. In addition, difficulty may be experienced in making guiding movements towards objects, and a decline in literacy skills including reading, writing, and spelling may develop. Furthermore, if neural death spreads into other anterior cortical regions, symptoms similar to Alzheimer's disease, such as memory loss, may result. In PCA where there is significant atrophy in one hemisphere of the brain hemispatial neglect may result – the inability to see stimuli on one half of the visual field. Anxiety and depression are also common symptoms.

=== Connection to Alzheimer's disease ===
Studies have shown that PCA may be a variant of Alzheimer's disease (AD), with an emphasis on visual deficits. Although in primarily different, but sometimes overlapping, brain regions, both involve progressive neural degeneration, as shown by the loss of neurons and synapses, and the presence of neurofibrillary tangles and senile plaques in affected brain regions; this eventually leads to dementia in both diseases. In PCA there is more cortical damage and gray matter (cell body) loss in posterior regions, especially in the occipital, parietal, and temporal lobes, whereas in Alzheimer's there is typically more damage in the prefrontal cortex and hippocampus. PCA tends to impair visuospatial working memory, while leaving episodic memory intact, whereas in AD there is typically impaired episodic memory, suggesting some differences still lie in the primary areas of cortical damage.

Over time, however, atrophy in PCA may spread to regions that are commonly damaged in AD, leading to shared AD symptoms such as deficits in memory, language, learning, and cognition. Although PCA has an earlier onset, a diagnosis with Alzheimer's is often made, suggesting that the degeneration has simply migrated anteriorly to other cortical brain regions.

There is no standard definition of PCA and no established diagnostic criteria, so it is not possible to know how many people have the condition. Some studies have found that about 5 percent of people diagnosed with Alzheimer's disease have PCA. However, because PCA often goes unrecognized, the true percentage may be as high as 15 percent. Researchers and physicians are working to establish a standard definition and diagnostic criteria for PCA.

PCA may also be correlated with Lewy body disease, Creutzfeldt–Jakob disease, Bálint's syndrome, and Gerstmann syndrome. In addition, PCA may result in part from mutations in the presenilin 1 gene (PSEN1).

== Diagnosis ==
The cause of PCA is unknown, and there are no fully accepted diagnostic criteria for the disease. This is partially due to the gradual onset of PCA symptoms, their variety, the rare nature of the disease, and the younger age of onset typically 50–60 years. In 2012, the first international conference on PCA was held in Vancouver, Canada. Continued research and testing will hopefully result in accepted and standardized criteria for diagnosis.

PCA is often initially misdiagnosed as an anxiety disorder or depression. It has been suggested that depression or anxiety may result from the symptoms of decreased visual function, and the progressive nature of the disease. Early visual impairments have often led to a referral to an ophthalmologist, which can result in unnecessary cataract surgery.

Due to the lack of biomarkers for PCA, neuropsychological examinations are advised. Neuroimaging can also assist in the diagnosis of PCA. For PCA and AD neuroimaging is carried out using MRI scans, single-photon emission computed tomography, and positron emission tomography (PET scans). Neuroimages are often compared to those of people with AD to assist diagnosis. Due to the early onset of PCA in comparison to AD, images taken at the early stages of the disease will vary from brain images in AD. At this early stage brain atrophy will be shown to be more centrally located in the right posterior lobe and occipital gyrus, while AD brain images show the majority of atrophy in the medial temporal cortex. This variation within the images will assist in early diagnosis of PCA; however, as the years go on the images will become increasingly similar, due to the majority of PCA also developing to AD later in life because of continued brain atrophy. A key aspect found through brain imaging of PCA patients is a loss of grey matter (collections of neuronal cell bodies) in the posterior and occipital temporal cortices within the right hemisphere.

For some people with PCA, neuroimaging may not give a clear diagnosis; therefore, careful observation in relation to PCA symptoms can also assist in the diagnosis. The variation and lack of organized clinical testing has led to continued difficulties and delays in the diagnosis of PCA.

== Treatment ==
Specific and accepted treatment for PCA has yet to be discovered; this may be due to the rarity and variations of the disease. At times people with PCA are treated with AD treatments, such as cholinesterase inhibitors: donepezil, rivastigmine, galantamine, and also memantine. Antidepressant drugs have also provided some positive effects.

Other treatments such as occupational therapy, or help with adapting to visual changes may help. Visual and tactile cues, adaptive equipment and digital aids to manipulate text may all be beneficial. People with PCA and their caregivers are likely to have different needs than the more typical cases of Alzheimer's disease, and may benefit from specialized support groups, or other groups for young people with dementia. No study to date has been definitive to provide accepted conclusive analysis on treatment options.
