= Dementia with Lewy Bodies Consortium =

International multidisciplinary researcher collaboration

The Dementia with Lewy Bodies Consortium (DLB Consortium or DLBC) is an international multidisciplinary collaboration of researchers interested in the dementia with Lewy bodies. It first convened in Newcastle upon Tyne, England, in October 1995. Between 1995 and 2005, it issued three DLBC Consensus Reports on dementia with Lewy bodies.

== Fourth Consensus Report ==
The 2017 rewrite of the diagnostic criteria for DLB was led by Ian G. McKeith of Newcastle University and supported by The National Institute on Aging, National Institutes of Neurological Disorders and Stroke, the Lewy Body Dementia Association, the Lewy Body Society, Alzheimer’s Association, Acadia Pharmaceuticals, Axovant Sciences, Banner Health, GE Healthcare, and Lundbeck.

== DLBC 2015 ==
The 2015 DLBC in the United States is a project of the Parkinson's Disease BioMarker Program of the National Institute of Neurological Disorders and Stroke that "establishes a group of centers dedicated to the study of dementia with Lewy bodies (DLB) ... to allow for the discovery of a biomarker for DLB to improve the diagnosis, care, and treatment of patients with this disease".

As of 2020, it includes nine centers that have Lewy body dementia experts who have "strong connections to the Lewy body dementia research and general community". The DLBC will "formalize and strengthen already existing collaboration among the participating centers". The nine centers as of 2018 are:

- Cleveland Clinic
- Florida Atlantic University
- Thomas Jefferson University
- Rush University
- University of California San Diego
- University of North Carolina
- University of Pennsylvania
- University of Pittsburgh
- VA Puget Sound Health Care System - University of Washington

The DLBC is funded by a "$6 million, five-year grant from the National Institutes of Health"; it was also funded by the Lewy Body Dementia Association and GE Healthcare.

== Sources ==
- McKeith IG (2017). "Chapter 5: Clinical diagnostic criteria for dementia with Lewy bodies". In Kosaka K (ed.). Dementia with Lewy bodies: clinical and biological aspects (1st ed.). Japan: Springer. doi:10.1007/978-4-431-55948-1. ISBN 978-4-431-55948-1.
