= Rapid eye movement sleep behavior disorder =

- Other names: REM behavior disorder
- Sleep talking in a person with RBD
- Specialty: Psychiatry, Sleep medicine

Rapid eye movement sleep behavior disorder, or REM sleep behavior disorder (RBD), is a sleep disorder in which people act out their dreams. It involves abnormal behavior during the sleep phase with rapid eye movement (REM) sleep. The major feature of RBD is loss of muscle atonia (i.e., the loss of paralysis) during otherwise intact REM sleep (during which paralysis is not only normal but necessary). The loss of motor inhibition leads to sleep behaviors ranging from simple limb twitches to more complex integrated movements that can be violent or result in injury to either the individual or their bedmates.

RBD is a very strong predictor of progression to a synucleinopathy (usually Parkinson's disease or dementia with Lewy bodies). Melatonin is useful in the treatment of RBD. RBD was first described in 1986.

== Classification ==
RBD is a parasomnia. It is categorized as either idiopathic or symptomatic. Idiopathic RBD is the term used when RBD is not associated with another ongoing neurological condition. When it results from an identifiable cause, RBD is referred to as symptomatic RBD, and considered a symptom of the underlying disorder.

== Characteristics ==
RBD is a sleep disorder characterized by the loss of normal skeletal muscle atonia during REM sleep and is associated with prominent motor activity and vivid dreaming. These dreams often involve screaming, shouting, laughing, crying, arm flailing, kicking, punching, choking, and jumping out of bed. The actions in an episode can result in injuries to oneself or one's bedmate. The sleeping person may be unaware of these movements. Dreams often involve violent or aggressive actions, and an attack theme such as being chased by people or animals. Because violence in dreams is more likely to be recalled, this could be an artifact of recall bias or selection bias. The individual with RBD may not be aware of having it. When awakened, people may be able to recall the dream they were having, which will match the actions they were performing.

Dream enactment behaviour is a core feature of RBD but is not an exclusive marker of the disorder; therefore, a history of recurrent dream enacting behaviour is only enough to receive a diagnosis of clinically probable RBD and the diagnosis of definite RBD is only given when there is polysomnography confirmation of complex motor behaviour during REM sleep. When RBD occurs in the absence of any known aetiology of the disorder it is referred to as idiopathic, however when RBD arises in relation to another neurological disorder or neurodegenerative disease, it is referred to as secondary or symptomatic RBD.

As the first indication of an underlying neurodegenerative disorder or synucleinopathy, symptoms of RBD may begin years or decades before the onset of another condition. Abnormal sleep behaviors may begin decades before any other symptoms, often as the first clinical indication of another condition.

RBD is a sleep disorder characterized by the loss of normal skeletal muscle atonia during REM sleep and is associated with prominent motor activity and vivid dreaming.

Symptomatic RBD can also be associated with narcolepsy, Guillain–Barré syndrome, limbic encephalitis, and Morvan's syndrome.

Other symptoms found in patients with RBD are reduced motor abilities, posture and gait changes, mild cognitive impairment, alterations in the sense of smell, impairments in color vision, autonomic dysfunction (orthostatic hypotension, constipation, urinary problems and sexual dysfunction), and depression.

== Causes ==
Rapid eye movement behavior disorder occurs when there is a loss of normal voluntary muscle atonia during REM sleep resulting in motor behavior in response to dream content. It can be caused by adverse reactions to certain drugs or during drug withdrawal; however, it is most often associated with the elderly and in those with neurodegenerative disorders such as Parkinson's disease and other neurodegenerative diseases, for example multiple system atrophy and the Lewy body dementias.

The underlying cause of RBD is not well understood, but it is likely that—in cases where it precedes the manifestation of synucleinopathy—RBD is an early symptom rather than a separate disorder. Brainstem circuits that control atonia during REM sleep may be damaged, including those in the pontomedullary brainstem. REM sleep circuits are located in caudal brainstem structures—the same structures that are known to lead to be implicated in the synucleinopathies. Motor deficits like those seen in RBD are known to result from lesions in those circuits.

Risk factors for developing RBD are a family history of acting out dreams, prior head injury, farming, exposure to pesticides, low education level, depression, and use of antidepressants.

RBD may be acute and sudden in onset if associated with drug treatment or withdrawal (particularly with alcohol withdrawal). Antidepressant medications can induce or aggravate RBD symptoms.

== Neuropathology of RBD in PD ==
There are a number of proposed explanations put forth by researchers to try and explain the cognitively impaired phenotype of PD that is linked to RBD. The first is that RBD affects sleep quality/content, which in turn could lead to cognitive dysfunction through various neuronal mechanisms. However, there is not much research support for this idea and there is a lack of association between different sleep disorders, such as insomnia, and cognitive decline in PD.

Another proposed explanation for the increased cognitive decline seen in PDRBD, is due to alterations in neurotransmitter systems. In particular, greater cholinergic denervation in PD patients with RBD compared to those without. This difference is seen particularly in brain structures like the basal forebrain, an area implicated in both cognition and the regulation of REM sleep and muscle tone through interactions with brainstem nuclei. The increased cholinergic denervation is proposed to appear in the third phase of Braak staging, in which Lewy body pathology in a PD brain appears in the basal forebrain and is thought to cause the reduction in cholinergic neurotransmitters. Thus, cholinergic reduction could play a key role in the pathogenesis of RBD in PD and the cognitive impairment found in these patients, making this a potential marker for a specific cognitive subset of PD. This hypothesis is supported by the amelioration of RBD symptoms through the use of acetylcholinesterase inhibitors, drugs which lead to an increase in cholinergic neurotransmitters in the brain.

A reduction in grey matter volume and cortical thinning, especially in the frontal cortex and inferior parietal lobe of the brain, have also been proposed as the potential cause of PDRBD. Due to the link of cortical and subcortical brain regions in these areas with cognition and REM sleep. The left insular cortex in particular has shown much greater levels of cortical thinning in PDRBD compared to PD without RBD. An area of the brain considered an 'integrating hub' of higher-level cognitive processes with social-emotional and sensorimotor functioning. However, there are a lot of inconsistent results within the literature surrounding differences in grey matter volume, and so alterations in brain matter volume are seen as a less reliable neurological marker.

== Diagnosis ==
There are two ways to diagnose RBD: by documenting a history of complex, dream-enactment sleep behaviors, or by polysomnography recording of these behaviors along with REM sleep atonia loss. The use of arm electromyography leads in polysomnography assists in the detection of RBD.

RBD may be established from clinical interview as well as several validated questionnaires, when sleep studies cannot be performed. Questionnaires such as the Rapid Eye Movement (REM) Sleep Behavior Disorder Screening Questionnaire (RBDSQ), the REM Sleep Behavior Questionnaires – Hong-Kong (RBD-HK), the Mayo Sleep Questionnaire (MSQ) and the Innsbruck REM Sleep Behavior Disorder Inventory are well-validated.

Individuals with RBD may not be able to provide a history of dream enactment behavior, so bed partners are also consulted. The REM Sleep Behavior Disorder Single-Question Screen offers diagnostic sensitivity and specificity in the absence of polysomnography with one question:

"Have you ever been told, or suspected yourself, that you seem to 'act out your dreams' while asleep (for example, punching, flailing your arms in the air, making running movements, etc.)?"

Diagnostic criteria for RBD from the International Classification of Sleep Disorders (ICSD-3) are:

1. Repetition of vocalizations and/or complex motor behaviors during sleep
2. Polysomnography (PSG) show that these behaviors occur during REM sleep
3. If documentation of these behaviors by PSG is not possible, they must at least be assumed to take place during REM sleep based on records of dream enactment
4. REM sleep without atonia (RWA) can be seen in polysomnographic recordings
5. Episodes cannot be explained by another mental disorder, sleep disorder, substance abuse or medication

=== Differential ===
Other conditions are similar to RBD in that individuals exhibit excessive sleep movement and potentially violent behavior. Such disorders include non-REM parasomnias (sleepwalking, sleep terrors), periodic limb movement disorder, severe obstructive sleep apnea, and dissociative disorders. Because of the similarities between the conditions, polysomnography plays an important role in confirming RBD diagnosis.

=== Cognitive Phenotype of PD with RBD ===
Amongst research on the link between RBD and PD, a specific cognitive phenotype of PD has emerged. This phenotype is classified as 'diffuse malignant' and is associated with faster cognitive decline/ more severe cognitive impairment. It has a much poorer prognosis and increases and those with this phenotype have an increased likelihood of going on to develop some form of dementia.

When observing both cross-sectional and longitudinal data regarding RBD and PD, deficits in global cognitive functioning, attention/working memory, language, executive functions, and visuospatial abilities can be seen in patients with RBD and PD (PDRBD); especially in comparison to PD patients without RBD (PD non-RBD). PDRBD show significantly greater annual rates of decline on established cognitive tests such as the MoCA test, and even have an increased likelihood of displaying clinical manifestations that have a strong link to PD dementia, for example visual hallucinations.

Patients with PDRBD report much higher subjective rates of cognitive decline compared to those without RBD and are much more likely to be diagnosed with mild cognitive impairment (MCI). On average 75%-80% of patients with PDRBD go onto receive a diagnosis of MCI, and then a further 30% develop some form of dementia, within 15–20 years of PD onset.

The difference in overall cognitive decline between PDRBD and PD non-RBD is replicated in studies conducted in many different cultures and remains strong regardless of whether participants are drug naïve or taking some form of dopaminergic treatment to aid with their PD. However, the existence of a unique and specific cognitively impaired profile among PD patients with RBD is still deemed controversial. This is mainly due to methodological limitations among the literature; such as the absence of polysomnography in the diagnosis of RBD, the use of tests with poor sensitivity when measuring cognition and testing for cognitive deficits, as well as small sample sizes. Despite this, many researchers do still advocate for the use of RBD as a premature clinical indicator of PD, which could provide an earlier window for potential preventative treatment of PD.

== Treatment ==
RBD is treatable (even when the underlying synucleinopathies are not). Melatonin and clonazepam are the most frequently used, and are comparably effective, but melatonin offers a safer alternative, because clonazepam can produce undesirable side effects.

Medications that may worsen RBD and should be stopped if possible are tramadol, mirtazapine, antidepressants, and beta blockers.

In addition to medication, it is wise to secure the sleeper's environment by removing potentially dangerous objects from the bedroom and either place a cushion around the bed or move the mattress to the floor for added protection against injuries. In extreme cases, an affected individual has slept in a sleeping bag zipped up to their neck, wearing mittens so they cannot unzip it until they awake.

Patients are advised to maintain a normal sleep schedule, avoid sleep deprivation, and keep track of any sleepiness they may have. Treatment includes regulating neurologic symptoms and treating any other sleep disorders that might interfere with sleep. Sleep deprivation, alcohol, certain medications, and other sleep disorders can all increase RBD and should be avoided if possible.

== Prognosis ==
Patients with RBD are at risk for sleep-related injury.Almost 92% of patients with idiopathic RBD will go on to develop a neurodegenerative disorder. The disorders most strongly associated with RBD are the synucleinopathies, particularly Parkinson's disease, dementia with Lewy bodies, and to a lesser extent, multiple system atrophy. Most people with RBD will convert to a synucleinopathy—usually Parkinson's disease or dementia with Lewy bodies—within 4 to 9 years from diagnosis of RBD, and 11 to 16 years from onset of symptoms.

== Epidemiology ==
Synucleinopathies are associated with RBD. RBD prevalence as of 2017 is estimated to be 0.5–2% overall, and 5–13% of those aged 60 to 99. It is more common in males overall, but equally frequent among men and women below the age of 50. This may partially be due to a referral bias, as violent activity carried out by men is more likely to result in harm and injury and is more likely to be reported than injury to male bed partners by women, or it may reflect a true difference in prevalence as a result of genetic or androgenic factors. Typical onset is in the 50s or 60s.

Almost half of those with Parkinson's, at least 88% of those with multiple system atrophy, and about 80% of people with Lewy body dementia have RBD. RBD is a very strong predictor of progression to a synucleinopathy (for example, the Lewy body dementias). On autopsy, up to 98% of individuals with polysomnography-confirmed RBD are found to have a synucleinopathy.

In the general population the incidence of RBD is around 0.5%, compared to the prevalence of RBD in PD patients, which has been reported to be between 38% and 60%. The diagnosis and symptom onset of RBD typically precedes the onset of motor or cognitive symptoms of PD by a number of years, typically ranging anywhere from 2 to 15 years prior. Hence, this link could provide an important window of opportunity in the implementation of therapies and treatments, that could prevent or slow the onset of PD.

== History ==
In the 1960s and 1970s, Michel Jouvet described brain lesions in cats that led to loss of atonia in REM sleep. Carlos Schenck and Mark Mahowald and their team in Minnesota first described RBD in 1986.

== In animals ==
RBD has also been diagnosed in animals, specifically dogs.

== See also ==
- Sleepwalk with Me
- Pseudobulbar affect
- Gelastic seizure
