= Neurocognitive disorder =

Mental health condition affecting cognitive functions

Neurocognitive disorders (NCDs), also known as cognitive disorders (CDs), are a category of mental health disorders that primarily affect cognitive abilities including learning, memory, perception, and problem-solving. Neurocognitive disorders include delirium, mild neurocognitive disorders, and major neurocognitive disorder (also known as dementia). They are defined by deficits in cognitive ability that are acquired (as opposed to developmental), typically represent decline, and may have an underlying brain pathology. The DSM-5 defines six key domains of cognitive function: executive function, learning and memory, perceptual-motor function, language, complex attention, and social cognition.

Although Alzheimer's disease accounts for the majority of cases of neurocognitive disorders, there are various medical conditions that affect mental functions such as memory, thinking, and the ability to reason, including frontotemporal degeneration, Huntington's disease, dementia with Lewy bodies, traumatic brain injury (TBI), Parkinson's disease, prion disease, and dementia/neurocognitive issues due to HIV infection. Neurocognitive disorders are diagnosed as mild and major based on the severity of their symptoms. While anxiety disorders, mood disorders, and psychotic disorders can also have an effect on cognitive and memory functions, they are not classified under neurocognitive disorders because loss of cognitive function is not the primary (causal) symptom. Additionally, developmental disorders such as autism typically have a genetic basis and become apparent at birth or early in life as opposed to the acquired nature of neurocognitive disorders.

Causes vary between the different types of disorders but most include damage to the memory portions of the brain. Treatments depend on how the disorder is caused. Medication and therapies are the most common treatments; however, for some types of disorders such as certain types of amnesia, treatments can suppress the symptoms but there is currently no cure.

== Classification ==
The previous edition of the Diagnostic and Statistical Manual of Mental Disorders (DSM-IV) included a section entitled "Delirium, Dementia and Amnestic and Other Cognitive Disorders," which was revised in DSM-5 to the broader "Neurocognitive Disorders." Neurocognitive disorders are described as those with "a significant impairment of cognition or memory that represents a marked deterioration from a previous level of function". The main principle distinguishing neurocognitive disorders from mood disorders and other psychiatric conditions that involve a cognitive component (i.e. increased lapses in memory noted by patients with depression) is that cognitive decline is the "defining characteristic" of the disorder. Additionally, the term "neurocognitive" was added because these disorders most often have alterations/disfunction in neural physiology (i.e. amyloid plaque build-up in Alzheimer disease). The subsections include delirium, mild neurocognitive disorder, and major neurocognitive disorder. Within each of these broader classifications, there are subclassifications based on disease etiology and symptoms.

=== Delirium ===
Delirium is a type of neurocognitive disorder that develops rapidly over a short period of time. Delirium may be described using many other terms, including: encephalopathy, altered mental status, altered level of consciousness, acute mental status change, and brain failure. It is described in the DSM-5 as a fluctuating acute change in mental status with associated changes in cognition, attention, and level of consciousness. The onset of delirium can vary from minutes to hours and sometimes days. However, the course of the delirium typically lasts from a few hours to weeks, depending on the underlying cause. Delirium can also be accompanied by a shift in attention, mood swings, violent or unordinary behaviors, and hallucinations. Additionally, changes in cognition can makes situational awareness and processing new information very difficult for patients. Delirium is most common in hospitalized patients, appearing in 18-35% of patients requiring hospital admission. It is also a diagnosis which can be acquired during hospital stays, typically by elderly patients or those with risk factors of delirium. Common risk factors for delirium include advanced age, extended hospital stay, infection, pain, and medication side effects. While it is a common diagnosis, delirium can increase the risk of a longer hospital stay and the risk of complications throughout the hospital stay.

==== Subclassifications ====
Delirium can fall into various subclassifications based on its cause and symptoms. These subclassifications include due to; substance abuse or withdrawal, medication, medical conditions, multiple causes. Differentiating between length of symptoms (hours vs days) and activity level (Increased, decreased, or mixed activity) is also used to specify the diagnosis.

=== Mild neurocognitive disorder ===
Mild neurocognitive disorders, also referred to as mild cognitive impairment (MCI), can be thought of as a middle ground between normal aging and major neurocognitive disorder. Unlike delirium, mild neurocognitive disorders tend to develop slowly and are characterized by a progressive memory loss which may or may not progress to major neurocognitive disorder. Studies have shown that between 5-17% of patients with mild cognitive disorder will progress to major neurocognitive disorder each year. The likelihood of developing mild neurocognitive disorder increases with age, affecting 10-20% of adults ages 65 and older. Men also seem to be at a higher risk of developing mild neurocognitive disorder. In addition to memory loss and cognitive impairment, other symptoms include aphasia, apraxia, agnosia, loss of abstract thought, behavioral/personality changes, and impaired judgment.

=== Major neurocognitive disorder ===
Mild and major neurocognitive disorders are differentiated based on the severity of their symptoms. Also still known as dementia, major neurocognitive disorder is characterized by significant cognitive decline and interference with independence, while mild neurocognitive disorder is characterized by moderate cognitive decline and does not interfere with independence. To be diagnosed, it must not be due to delirium or other mental disorder. They are also usually accompanied by another cognitive dysfunction. For non-reversible causes of dementia such as age, the slow decline of memory and cognition is lifelong.

==== Subclassifications ====
Similarly to delirium, both mild and major neurocognitive disorders are subclassifed based on cause (Alzheimer's, Frontotemporal degeneration, Parkinson's etc.). Symptoms used to guide diagnosis include the presence or absence of behavioral symptoms such as psychosis, agitation, depression. Current severity of symptoms is also used in classification and is based on the individuals current ability to complete daily activities like housework, managing finances, feeding, or bathing.

== Diagnosis ==
There are multiple testing methods used to assess a patient's cognition and level of consciousness, including the Mini Mental Status Exam (MMSE), Montreal Cognitive Assessment (MoCA), Mini-Cog, and Cognitive Assessment Method (CAM), Glasgow Coma Score (GCS), Richmond Agitation and Sedation Scale (RASS), etc. The CAM has been shown to be the most commonly used tool to assess for delirium. Additionally, a meta-analysis looking at the accuracy and usefulness of the various testing methods reported that the MMSE was the most commonly used tool to evaluate major neurocognitive disorder, while the MoCA appeared to be the most useful when screening for minor neurocognitive disorder. More recent systematic reviews have demonstrated the need for further, well designed research on the Mini-Cog and MoCA for evaluating cognitive decline and the development of clinical guidelines on their use in various settings.

== Causes ==
=== Delirium ===
There are many causes of delirium, and many times there are multiple factors that can be contributing to delirium, particularly in the hospital setting. Common potential causes of delirium include new or worsening infections (i.e. urinary tract infections, pneumonia, and sepsis), neurological injury/infections (i.e. stroke and meningitis), environmental factors (i.e. immobilization and sleep deprivation), and medication/drug use (i.e. side effects of new medications, drug interactions, and use/withdrawal from recreational drugs).

=== Mild and major neurocognitive disorder ===
Neurocognitive disorders can have numerous causes: genetics, brain trauma, stroke, and heart issues. The main causes are neurodegenerative diseases such as Alzheimer's disease, Parkinson's disease, and Huntington's disease because they affect or deteriorate brain functions. Other diseases and conditions that cause NCDs include vascular dementia, frontotemporal degeneration, Lewy body disease, prion disease, normal pressure hydrocephalus, and dementia/neurocognitive issues due to HIV infection (AIDS). They may also include dementia due to substance abuse, adverse effects to medications or exposure to toxins.

Neurocognitive disorders may also be caused by brain trauma, including concussions and traumatic brain injuries, as well as post-traumatic stress and alcoholism. This is referred to as amnesia, and is characterized by damage to major memory encoding parts of the brain such as the hippocampus. Difficulty creating recent term memories is called anterograde amnesia and is caused by damage to the hippocampus part of the brain, which is a major part of the memory process. Retrograde amnesia is also caused by damage to the hippocampus, but the memories that were encoded or in the process of being encoded in long-term memory are erased.

== Treatment ==
=== Delirium ===
The overarching principle of delirium treatment is finding and treating the underlying cause. If the patient is truly experiencing delirium, their symptoms should begin improving/resolving with proper treatment of their illness, intoxication, etc. Non pharmacologic interventions to treat delirium are the first-line treatment options. These include options such as verbal reorientation to time and place, allowing for adequate sleep, making sure the individual is adequately hydrated, addressing constipation or urinary retention. If non-pharmacologic interventions fail, Medication such as antipsychotics can help reduce the symptoms of agitation and aid with sleep for some cases. There is limited evidence that the use of antipsychotic medications reduces the total length of a delirious state. In cases of delirium caused by alcohol or other sedative drug withdrawal, benzodiazepines can be considered to alleviate symptoms, and prevent seizures or death. For individuals with delirium due to causes aside from sedative withdrawal, benzodiazepines can actually worsen delirium and its use should be limited. For alcohol or malnourished cases, vitamin B supplements are recommended and for extreme cases, life-support can be used.

=== Mild and major neurocognitive disorder ===
There is no cure for neurocognitive disorder or the diseases that cause it. However, there are many interventions, both pharmacologic and non-pharmacologic that can aid with symptoms, slow disease progress, and improve quality of life. Lifestyle changes include following the MIND (Mediterranian-DASH Intervention for Neurodegenerative Delay) diet. This diet consists of foods rich in antioxidants and omega–3 such as leafy greens, nuts, and fish, with reduction of red meat and foods that are high in saturated fats. Studies have shown not only a reduction in the incidence of dementia in populations that follow the MIND diet, but also improved cognitive outcomes in patients who already have the disease. Similar impact is noted with regular physical activity as it can increase neuroplasticity, and prevent cognitive decline. Studies also suggest that diets with high omega–3 content, low in saturated fats and sugars, along with regular exercise can increase the level of brain plasticity. Other studies have shown that mental exercise such a newly developed "computerized brain training programs" can also help build and maintain targeted specific areas of the brain. These studies have been very successful for those diagnosed with schizophrenia and can improve fluid intelligence, the ability to adapt and deal with new problems or challenges the first time encountered, and in young people, it can still be effective in later life. Interventions such as rehabilitation including physical, occupational, and speech therapy can help prevent functional decline in individuals with dementia. Although older patients with major neurocognitive disorders usually require assistance with their daily activities leading to placement in long-term care homes, a proper rehabilitation regimen can help to delay this. Speech therapy has been shown to help with language impairment, therefore improving long-term development and academic outcome. Ongoing psychotherapy and psychosocial support for patients and families are usually necessary for clear understanding and proper management of the disorder and to maintain a better quality of life for everyone involved. As the disease progresses, individuals may start to struggle to make decisions for themselves. It is important to discuss advance care planning and goals of care early on in the disease course so that the individuals wishes can be known.

Safety concerns which are another important aspect to the care of an individual with dementia. Studies have shown a significant increase in fall risk and hip fractures in patients with dementia. Adjustments at home include avoiding stairs, preventing clutter in walkways, and removing loose carpets can all aid in preventing falls. Wandering is also a behavior associated with dementia that can lead to injury or even death. Appropriate supervision is recommended for individuals with dementia who display wandering behavior. Other measures include making sure that the person has identification on them at all times i.e. identifying bracelet or necklace with their name, address, and contact information. Driving is another safety concern that should be addressed. While those in early stages of dementia may still be able to drive safely for many years, as the disease progresses it ultimately does reach a point where it becomes unsafe.

There are many medical therapies that have been shown to have benefit in individuals with neurocognitive disorders. Various neuropsychiatric symptoms associated with dementia which can be managed with medications. Individuals with dementia may struggle with sleep including reduced hours of sleep and poor quality of sleep overall. Medications such as melatonin, ramelteon, or trazodone have shown varying evidence in promoting adequate sleep in patients with dementia. Depression, anxiety, agitation, or aggression are other common neuropsychiatric symptoms. Management of these symptoms with medications can be beneficial. Antidepressants can help with many of the mood disturbances seen in dementia, and are typically well tolerated in older individuals. In cases of extreme behavioral disturbances including psychosis and aggression potentially leading to harm of self or others, antipsychotic medications can be considered. These medications are not well tolerated in elderly populations due to their side effects and therefore should only be used if there is no alternative. Management of cardiovascular and stroke risk with proper medical management of hypertension, diabetes, and cholesterol have been shown to reduce the progression of cognitive decline.

There are also many medical therapies aimed at improving cognition in those with neurocognitive disorders. Cholinesterase inhibitors, medications which increase the amount of the neurotransmitter Acetylcholine in the brain, have shown mild improvements in cognition in patients with dementia. Examples of cholinesterase inhibitors include donepezil, rivastigmine, and galantamine. These medications are used to mask the symptoms of dementia, but do not alter the disease course or cure the underlying disease. NMDA receptor antagonists such as memantine are another class of medication that are commonly utilized for patients with dementia, and have shown some benefits in cognition as well. Newer therapies include anti-amyloid antibodies which are targeted towards harmful proteins in the brain. Unlike the medications discussed previously, these newer therapies are potentially disease modifying. These new therapies are limited to Alzheimer's type dementia, but have shown to be highly effective in reducing amyloid plaque levels in the brain. Long term outcomes of these new medications on clinical outcomes and cognition are still limited, and they have potential risk for brain swelling and hemorrhage.

== See also ==
- List of cognitive disorders
