= Ian G. McKeith =

British researcher

Ian G. McKeith is a British researcher who is a professor of Old Age Psychiatry at Newcastle University in Newcastle upon Tyne in the North-East of England. He is a Fellow of the Royal Society of Biology and a Fellow of the Academy of Medical Sciences.

McKeith is credited with bringing together international researchers to develop and refine diagnostic criteria for Lewy body dementias (LBD). In 2015, he was given a Lifetime Achievement Award in Alzheimer's Research from the Alzheimer's Association for his groundbreaking work in LBD. He was also honoured that year by the Lewy Body Dementia Association for his work in LBD advocacy and research. As a member of the Scientific Advisory Board for the Lewy Body Dementia Association, he led the Dementia with Lewy Bodies Consortium effort that published new diagnostic criteria for dementia with Lewy bodies in 2017.

In 2018, he was the President of the Lewy Body Society, a European charity whose mission is to raise awareness of dementia with Lewy bodies.
