= Kenji Kosaka =

Kenji Kosaka may refer to:

- Kenji Kosaka (politician)
- Kenji Kosaka (psychiatrist)
