= REM Sleep Behavior Disorder Single-Question Screen =

Screening for dream enactment behaviors

The REM Sleep Behavior Disorder Single-Question Screen (RBD1Q) is a one-question screening tool for dream enactment behaviors associated with the parasomnia REM sleep behavior disorder (RBD). It screens for RBD with a simple yes/no response.

== Format ==
The RBD1Q queries dream-enactment behavior of RBD with a single yes/no question:

"Have you ever been told, or suspected yourself, that you seem to 'act out your dreams' while asleep (for example, punching, flailing your arms in the air, making running movements, etc.)?"

It has a sensitivity of 94% and a specificity of 87% in detecting RBD.

== Applications ==
The RBD1Q can be used to establish a diagnosis of REM sleep behavior disorder in Parkinson's disease and dementia with Lewy bodies.

== Development ==
Other screening tools for RBD are lengthy and difficult to use for epidemiological studies, needed to determine the prevalence of RBD.

Participants for a case-control study were recruited from twelve centers of the International REM Sleep Behavior Disorder Study Group between 2008 and 2011. The 484 participants (242 individuals with polysomnogram-confirmed RBD and 242 controls) completed the screen. Dream-enactment behavior was established by history or video recording, and the absence of REM sleep muscle paralysis (atonia) was confirmed by polysomnogram, according to the International Classification of Sleep Disorders-2.
