= Cingulate island sign =

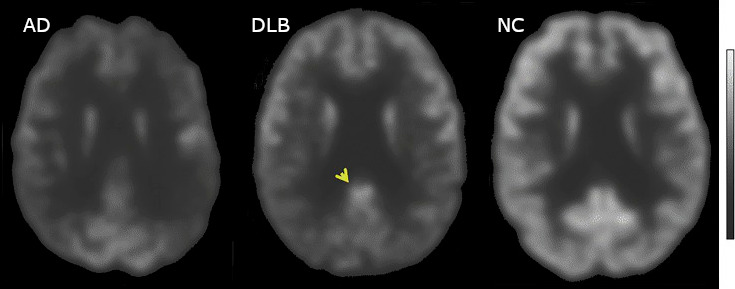
- FDG-PET of horizontal cross section brain. Brighter areas indicate higher metabolism, and the cingulate island sign is present in DLB (arrow), unlike Alzheimer's disease (AD) and normal (NC).
- Differential diagnosis: Dementia with Lewy bodies

In medicine, the cingulate island sign is a finding on FDG-PET brain scans that metabolism in the posterior cingulate cortex is preserved. It can help to identify dementia with Lewy bodies (DLB) and distinguish it from Alzheimer's disease and other dementias.
