= Frontal Assessment Battery =

Test to evaluate executive function

- Purpose: Evaluate executive function

The Frontal Assessment Battery (FAB) is a short screening test to evaluate executive function (EF).

== Format ==
FAB is a battery of tests, consisting of six subtests, that takes about 10 minutes and is designed as a short bedside assessment of executive function.

== Applications ==
FAB is useful in the differential diagnosis of neurological diseases including Parkinson's disease, corticobasal degeneration, frontotemporal dementias, Alzheimer's disease, Huntington's disease, progressive supranuclear palsy, and dementia with Lewy bodies.

== Development ==
FAB was developed by Dubois et al. in 2000 and became a widely used tool.
