= Lewy body dementia =

Two subtypes of dementia

Lewy body dementia (LBD) is an umbrella term for two similar and common subtypes of dementia: dementia with Lewy bodies (DLB) and Parkinson's disease dementia (PDD). Both are characterized by changes in thinking, movement, behavior, and mood. The two conditions have similar features and may have similar causes, and are believed to belong on a spectrum of Lewy body disease that includes Parkinson's disease. As of 2014, they were more often misdiagnosed than any other common dementia.

The exact cause is unknown, but involves widespread deposits of abnormal clumps of protein that form in neurons of the diseased brain. Known as Lewy bodies (discovered in 1912 by Frederic Lewy) and Lewy neurites, these clumps affect both the central nervous system and the autonomic nervous system. The 2013 revision of the Diagnostic and Statistical Manual of Mental Disorders gives Lewy body disease as the causative subtype of dementia with Lewy bodies, and Parkinson's disease as the causative subtype of Parkinson's disease dementia. Dementia with Lewy bodies is marked by the presence of Lewy bodies primarily in the cortical regions, while Parkinson's disease dementia with Lewy bodies is marked by the presence of Lewy bodies primarily in the subcortical basal ganglia.

== Classification ==
The synucleinopathies (dementia with Lewy bodies, Parkinson's disease dementia, and Parkinson's disease) are characterized by shared features of parkinsonism motor symptoms, neuropsychiatric symptoms, impaired cognition, sleep disorders, and visual hallucinations. The Lewy body dementias—dementia with Lewy bodies (DLB), and Parkinson's disease dementia (PDD)—are distinguished by the timing when cognitive and motor symptoms appear. The two Lewy body dementias are often considered to belong on a spectrum of Lewy body disease that includes Parkinson's disease.

MeSH lists Lewy body disease in several categories: as a nervous system disease in two listings, one as a basal ganglia Parkinsonian movement disorder and the other under brain disease as a dementia; as a neurodegenerative disorder listed as a synucleinopathy; and as a neurocognitive disorder listed with dementia.

A genetic architecture that predisposes an individual to some disease phenotypes is found in Parkinson's disease and the Lewy body dementias. The presence of Lewy bodies is a link between these disorders; the term "diseases with Lewy bodies" therefore may be more accurate than "Lewy body disease".

== Cause and mechanisms ==
Dementia with Lewy bodies and Parkinson's disease dementia are similar in many ways, suggesting there may be a common pathophysiological mechanism, with PDD and DLB at opposite ends of a Lewy body disease spectrum, and a shared component of protein deposits in Lewy bodies and Lewy neurites. Lewy bodies and neurites have been found to develop from the aggregation of misfolded alpha-synuclein, a protein thought to assist in neurotransmitter release and vesicle turnover; whether these misfolded proteins are responsible for the neurodegenerative effects remains unclear, and no definitive link between Lewy bodies and neurodegenerative effects has been found. DSM-5 gives Lewy body disease as the causative subtype of DLB, and Parkinson's disease as the causative subtype of PDD. DLB is marked by the presence of Lewy bodies primarily in the cortical regions, and PDD with Lewy bodies primarily in the subcortical basal ganglia.

Despite differences in the timing of the appearance of symptoms, the two dementias "show remarkably convergent neuropathological changes at autopsy". The relationship between Parkinson's disease dementia and dementia with Lewy bodies is unclear as of 2020, but there is likely to be genetic overlap, and the two conditions may represent different points on a continuum.

== Diagnosis ==
Dementia with Lewy bodies and Parkinson's disease dementia have similar neuropathological features, but these features are highly variable and the conditions cannot be distinguished on pathological features alone. Generally, dementia with Lewy bodies is distinguished from Parkinson's disease dementia by the time frame in which dementia symptoms appear relative to parkinsonian symptoms and is diagnosed when cognitive symptoms begin before or at the same time as parkinsonism. Parkinson's disease dementia is the diagnosis when Parkinson's disease is already well established before the dementia occurs.

== Epidemiology ==
Between 5% and 25% of diagnosed dementias in older adults are due to one of the Lewy body dementias. (Note: Kosaka (2017) writes: "Dementia with Lewy bodies (DLB) is now well known to be the second most frequent dementia following Alzheimer disease (AD). Of all types of dementia, AD is known to account for about 50%, DLB about 20% and vascular dementia (VD) about 15%. Thus, AD, DLB, and VD are now considered to be the three major dementias." Hershey (2019) says, "DLB is the third most common of all the neurodegenerative diseases behind both Alzheimer's disease and Parkinson's disease".) As of 2014, the Lewy body dementias affect about 1.3 million people in the US and 140,000 in the UK. As of 2026, Lewy body dementia affects about 1,400,000 individuals in the United States.

LBD usually develops after the age of 50. Men are slightly more likely to be diagnosed than women.

== Prognosis ==
Life expectancy of people with one of the LBD is reduced; following diagnosis it ranges on average from five to eight years.

== Society and culture ==
=== Advocacy and awareness ===
As of 2014, the Lewy body dementias were more often misdiagnosed than any other common dementia. Most people with DLB had not heard of the condition prior to diagnosis; general awareness about LBD lags well behind that of Parkinson's and Alzheimer's diseases, even though LBD is the second most common dementia, after Alzheimer's. It is not only frustrating for families and caregivers to find that few people, including many healthcare professionals, are knowledgeable about LBD; lack of knowledge can have significant health consequences because people with LBD have severe sensitivity to antipsychotics often used to treat the symptoms. The Lewy Body Dementia Association (US) and the Lewy Body Society (UK) promote awareness and provide support that helps society, by reducing costly use of healthcare, and families with LBD, by reducing stress. These organizations, and others in Argentina, Australia and Japan, help raise knowledge and help families with LBD become advocates to raise awareness about the disease.

=== Notable individuals ===
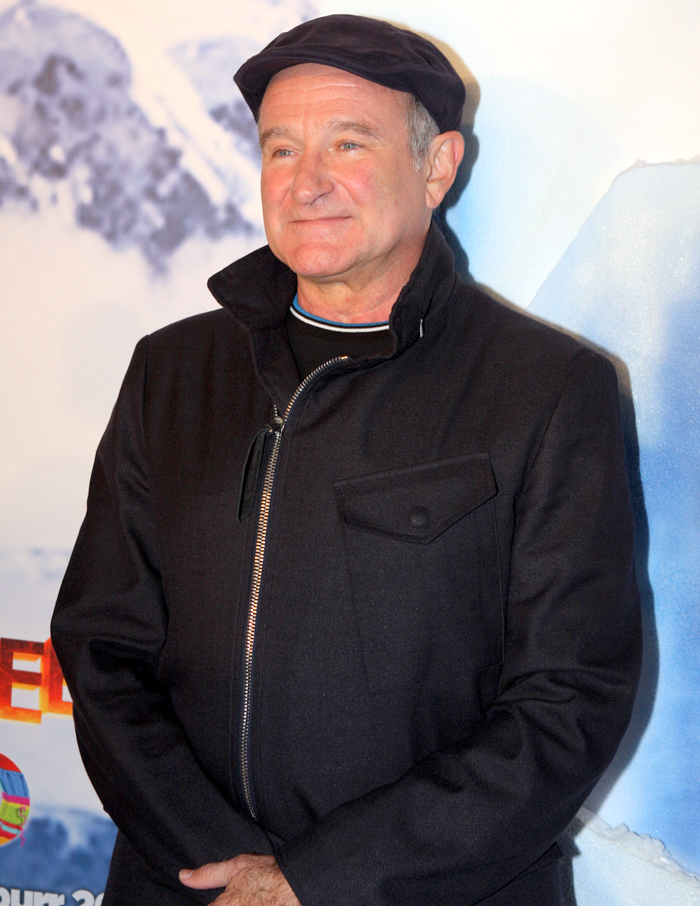
Robin Williams (shown in 2011): his widow said he was diagnosed on autopsy with Lewy bodies.

Robin Williams, the American actor and comedian, died on August 11, 2014. Before his suicide, he had been diagnosed with Parkinson's disease, and according to his widow, Susan Schneider Williams, he experienced depression, anxiety, and increasing paranoia. Upon autopsy, his widow said he was found to have diffuse Lewy body disease, while the autopsy used the term diffuse Lewy body dementia. The vocabulary associated with Lewy pathology causes confusion. Lewy body dementia (the umbrella term that encompasses the clinical diagnoses of dementia with Lewy bodies and Parkinson's disease dementia) differs from Lewy body disease (the term used to describe pathological findings of Lewy bodies on autopsy). Dennis Dickson, a spokesperson for the Lewy Body Dementia Association, clarified the distinction by stating that diffuse Lewy body dementia is more commonly called diffuse Lewy body disease and refers to the underlying disease process. According to Dickson, "Lewy bodies are generally limited in distribution" in early Parkinson's disease, while in dementia with Lewy bodies, "the Lewy bodies are spread widely throughout the brain, as was the case with Robin Williams." Ian G. McKeith, professor and researcher of Lewy body dementias, commented that Williams' symptoms and autopsy findings were explained by dementia with Lewy bodies.

The British author and poet Mervyn Peake died in 1968 and was diagnosed posthumously as a probable case of DLB in a 2003 paper published in JAMA Neurology. Sahlas said his death was "variously ascribed to Alzheimer disease, Parkinson disease, or postencephalitic parkinsonism". Based on signs in his work and letters of progressive deterioration, fluctuating cognitive decline, deterioration in visuospatial function, declining attention span, and visual hallucinations and delusions, his may be the earliest known case where DLB was found to have been the likely cause of death.

Other entertainers and artists who have or died from LBD include Estelle Getty, the actress known for her role as Sophia on the television series The Golden Girls, Nicholas King, a US actor and horticulturist, actress Dina Merrill, Donald Featherstone, who created the plastic pink flamingo, American radio and television host Casey Kasem, Great White singer Jack Russell, Canadian singer Pierre Lalonde, graphic artist/film set designer Ron Cobb, American actor Frank Bonner, Canadian musician and actor André Gagnon, Mark Volman, founding member of the band the Turtles, French film, television and stage actress Nathalie Marie Andrée Baye, and American writer and artist Sam Kieth, co-creator of The Sandman and The Maxx. Sir Patrick Stewart died from complications of alzheimer's disease and Lewy body dementia in 2026.

British author Michael Bywater died of LBD.American businesswoman Jacklyn Bezos died of LBD.

Individuals from industry or government who have or died from LBD include Seymour Berry, US Director of the Bureau of Engraving and Printing, Los Angeles Times publisher Otis Chandler, Philip J. Rock, a US Democratic politician of the Illinois Senate, US media mogul and philanthropist Ted Turner, and Indian-born British billionaire S. P. Hinduja.

Arnold R. Hirsch, an American historian who taught at the University of New Orleans, and Jessie Isabelle Price, an American veterinary microbiologist, died from LBD.

In the sports realm, Jerry Sloan, American professional basketball player and coach, died from LBD. Major League Baseball players Tom Seaver, Andy Carey, and Bill Buckner died of LBD. Stan Mikita, Canadian ice hockey player, was diagnosed with possible LBD, but a post-mortem brain autopsy found that he had chronic traumatic encephalopathy.

=== In popular culture ===
Robin's Wish, a documentary exploring Robin Williams's Lewy body disease and how it contributed to his death, was released in September 2020.

Sleepwalk with Me is a book, one-man comedy, and film about a young man with relationship problems and RBD, a precursor to synucleinopathy, including LBD.

"The Malfunctioning Brain: The World of Patients with Lewy Body Dementia", a book authored by Naomi Higuchi from Japan, a patient with Lewy body dementia.

"Ahead of All Parting", a book authored by Barry Michels from the United States, a patient with Lewy body dementia.
