= Mild cognitive impairment =

Neurocognitive disorder

- Other names: Incipient dementia, isolated memory impairment, mild neurocognitive disorder
- Specialty: Neurology
- Symptoms: Can include memory impairments (amnestic) or cognitive problems like impaired decision making, language, or visuospatial skills (non-amnestic)
- Usual onset: Typically appears in adults 65 or older
- Types: Amnestic, non-amnestic
- Risk factors: Age, family history, cardiovascular disease
- Diagnostic method: Based on symptoms assessed by a clinical neuropsychologist through observations, neuroimaging, and blood tests

Mild cognitive impairment (MCI) is a diagnosis that reflects an intermediate stage of cognitive impairment that is often, but not always, a transitional phase from cognitive changes in normal aging to those typically found in dementia, especially dementia due to Alzheimer's disease (Alzheimer's dementia). MCI may include both memory and non-memory neurocognitive impairments. About 50 percent of people diagnosed with MCI have Alzheimer's disease and go on to develop Alzheimer's dementia within five years. MCI can also serve as an early indicator for other types of dementia, although MCI may also remain stable or remit. Many definitions of MCI exist. A common feature of many of these is that MCI involves cognitive impairments that are measurable but that are not significant enough to interfere with instrumental activities of daily living.

The DSM-5 introduces the concept of mild neurocognitive disorder (mNCD), which is designed to be largely equivalent to MCI. The International Classification of Diseases (ICD-11) refers to MCI as "Mild Neurocognitive Disorder (MND)". It is controversial whether MCI should be used as a diagnosis.

The definition of MCI continues to evolve. Academic discussion revolves around whether MCI should be classified or diagnosed algorithmically or clinically, the reliability of clinical judgment, stability of the diagnosis over time, and the utility or predictivity of biomarkers. Differences in the definition and implementation of the MCI construct can explain some discrepancies between research studies.

== Classification ==
MCI can present with a variety of symptoms, but is divided generally into two types.

Amnestic MCI (aMCI) is mild cognitive impairment with memory loss as the predominant symptom; aMCI is frequently seen as a prodromal stage of Alzheimer's disease. Studies suggest that these individuals tend to progress to probable Alzheimer's disease at a rate of approximately 10% to 15% per year. It is possible that being diagnosed with cognitive decline may serve as an indicator of MCI.

Nonamnestic MCI (naMCI) is mild cognitive impairment in which impairments in domains other than memory (for example, language, visuospatial, executive) are more prominent. It may be further divided as nonamnestic single- or multiple-domain MCI, and these individuals are believed to be more likely to convert to other dementias (for example, dementia with Lewy bodies).

== Causes ==
Mild cognitive impairment (MCI) may be caused due to alteration in the brain triggered during early stages of Alzheimer's disease, to other causes, or to a combination of causes. Brain damage, brain injury, delirium and prolonged substance abuse can cause MCI. HIV-associated neurocognitive disorder can cause MCI. Risk factors of both dementia and MCI are the same, and include: aging, genetics, and cardiovascular disease. There is a significant association between mild cognitive impairment (MCI) and hearing impairment, although most cases of MCI are not due to hearing impairment. Hearing loss in individuals with MCI may contribute to further cognitive decline; however, this relationship may also reflect shared neuropathological processes involving cortical regions responsible for auditory function.

== Diagnosis ==
The first step in the diagnosis is screening. Montreal Cognitive Assessment (MoCA) is one of the screening tools that may guide a detailed evaluation. The diagnosis of MCI requires clinical judgement, possibly including clinical observation, neuroimaging, blood tests and neuropsychological testing. MCI may be diagnosed differently by different clinicians using different definitions or criteria, but generally including:

1. Evidence of modest cognitive decline from a previous level of performance in one or more cognitive domains, based on either: concern about cognitive decline from the individual, a knowledgeable informant, or a clinician, or modest impairment in cognitive performance documented by standardized neuropsychological testing.
2. The cognitive deficits do not interfere with capacity for independence in everyday activities. However, greater effort, compensatory strategies, or accommodation may be required for complex tasks.

=== Neuropathology ===
Magnetic resonance imaging can observe deterioration, including progressive loss of gray matter in the brain, from MCI to full-blown Alzheimer dementia. A technique known as PiB PET imaging is used to show the sites and shapes of beta amyloid deposits in living subjects using a ^{11}C tracer that binds selectively to such deposits. Individuals with MCI may have increased oxidative damage in their nuclear and mitochondrial brain DNA.

== Treatment ==
The American Academy of Neurology's (AAN) clinical practice guideline on MCI from January 2018 stated that clinicians should identify modifiable risk factors in individuals with MCI, assess functional impairments, provide treatment for any behavioral or neuropsychiatric symptoms, and monitor the individual's cognitive status over time. It also stated that medications which cause cognitive impairment should be discontinued or avoided if possible. Due to the lack of evidence supporting the efficacy of cholinesterase inhibitors in individuals with MCI, the AAN guideline stated that clinicians who choose to prescribe them for the treatment of MCI must inform patients about the lack of evidence supporting this therapy. The guideline also indicated that clinicians should recommend that individuals with MCI engage in regular physical exercise for cognitive symptomatic benefits; clinicians may also recommend cognitive training, which appears to provide some symptomatic benefit in certain cognitive measures. Current evidence suggests that cognition-based interventions do improve mental performance (i.e. memory, executive function, attention, and speed) in older adults and people with mild cognitive impairment. Especially, immediate and delayed verbal recall resulted in higher performance gains from memory training.

Diet improvements are likely beneficial to MCI. However, there is currently limited evidence to form a strong conclusion to recommend particular carbohydrate supplements in preventing or reducing cognitive decline in older adults with normal cognition or mild cognitive impairment.

According to research conducted in England, people with MCI often do not receive adequate care and support in healthcare settings. This leaves them and their families in a limbo with uncertainty regarding their futures and the fear of possibly developing dementia. The lack of services also fails to point them to effective ways to prevent dementia such as exercise and social contact. Successful dementia prevention services would have to be tailored to people's preferences and backgrounds.

As MCI may represent a prodromal state to clinical Alzheimer's dementia, treatments for Alzheimer's disease could potentially be useful. Of these, rivastigmine failed to stop or slow progression to Alzheimer's disease or to improve cognitive function for individuals with mild cognitive impairment; donepezil showed only minor, short-term benefits and was associated with significant side effects.

== Outlook ==
MCI does not usually interfere with daily life.

== Prevalence ==
The prevalence of MCI varies by age. The prevalence of MCI among different age groups is as follows: 6.7% for ages 60–64; 8.4% for ages 65–69, 10.1% for ages 70–74, 14.8% for ages 75–79, and 25.2% for ages 80–84. After a two-year follow-up, the cumulative incidence of dementia among individuals who are over 65 years old and were diagnosed with MCI was found to be 14.9%.

Due to the emphasis shifting to the earlier diagnosis of dementia, more people are assessed who report memory problems. In turn this also leads diagnosing more people who might have MCI which is a risk factor for dementia. Globally, approximately 16% of the population over the age of 70 experiences some type of MCI.

== History ==
MCI was initially conceptualized as an intermediate stage between normal aging and Alzheimer's disease. In 2003 international criteria for MCI were developed that broadened the definition to include people with cognitive impairment due to any etiology. Furthermore, the definition of Alzheimer's disease expanded to include earlier, non-dementia, stages. So now, MCI can either be a diagnosis associated with early Alzheimer's disease (i.e., people with MCI that also have Alzheimer's disease) or a diagnosis of cognitive decline due to a cause other than Alzheimer's disease; it is no longer considered to be a stage between normal aging and Alzheimer's disease.
