= Visuospatial function =

Cognitive processes needed to analyze spatial structure and relations

In cognitive psychology, visuospatial function refers to cognitive processes necessary to "identify, integrate, and analyze space and visual form, details, structure and spatial relations" in more than one dimension.

Visuospatial skills are needed for movement, depth and distance perception, and spatial navigation. Impaired visuospatial skills can result in, for example, poor driving ability because distances are not judged correctly or difficulty navigating in space such as bumping into things.

Visuospatial processing refers to the "ability to perceive, analyze, synthesize, manipulate and transform visual patterns and images". Visuospatial working memory (VSWM) is involved in recalling and manipulating images to remain oriented in space and keep track of the location of moving objects.

Early impairment in visuospatial function is found in dementia with Lewy bodies and other conditions.

== See also ==
- Sensory nervous system
- Spatial memory
- Stereopsis
- Visual agnosia
- Visual spatial attention
- Visual system
