= Behavior change (individual) =

Change in life

A behavioral change can be a temporary or permanent effect that is considered a change in an individual's behavior when compared to previous behavior. It is sometimes considered a mental disorder, yet it is also a strategy used to improve such disorders. This change is generally characterized by changes in thinking, interpretations, emotions, or relationships. These changes can be either good or bad, depending on which behavior is being affected. Often, it takes much more work to change behavior for the better than it does to experience a negative change. Medications can cause this change as a side effect. The interaction between physiological processes and their effect on individual behavior is the basis of psychophysiology. Several theories exist as to why and how behavioral change can be affected, including behaviorism, Self-efficacy theory, and the stages of change model.

Behavioral change can be very beneficial to an individual. Two such theories on the subject include behavior modification theory and cognitive behavioral theory. Both of these seek to help a patient engage in a positive behavioral change. Both legal and illegal drugs have been shown to alter behavior, both acutely and chronically. In both cases, following common sense harm reduction strategies can potentially reduce these side-effects. With mental illness, behavioral change is a menace, with drugs it is expected, and with the right techniques it can be a method to improve quality of life. In recent decades there has been an increased knowledge of common causes of these changes, such as mental illness and drug use, while several psychological fields regarding the study of inducing beneficial changes in individuals have been developed and applied, resulting in a variety of novel solutions.

== Clinical and psychological impacts ==
While some behavioral changes can be beneficial, others can cause serious harm to the individual experiencing them. Sometimes, a change can be due to something as small as an environmental cue, whereas other cases may take a more multifaceted approach. In those cases, there are several treatment options available. Behavior modification is one method used to correct harmful behaviors. This method is centered around the concept of using rewards and punishments in order to condition the patient out of the behavior. Cognitive behavioral therapy can be used in the effort to change the behavior of an individual. This type of therapy focuses in on challenging and changing maladaptive behaviors by utilizing emotional self-regulation, while also developing beneficial coping mechanisms.

Similarly, medication can cause changes in people’s behavior. In some instances, the reaction to a medication is an expected effect. For example, someone who is taking an opiate for pain should expect to feel sleepy and relaxed. In other instances, a behavior change may indicate that the dosage of medication is at a toxic level, or is an indication of hypersensitivity to the medication. For example, someone taking a stimulant medication should not experience depression. While this can be a very serious consequence, it is a concern that needs to be balanced with the effective dose of that medication. Geriatric patients are more susceptible to these effects. As a related note, various illicit drugs can also impact behavior change, without the benefit of having a medical professional to monitor the user. Drugs such as cannabis, opiates, stimulants, hallucinogens and barbiturates can have a very serious impact on one's behavior, with both acute and chronic usage leading to change.

== Non-medical causes ==
While behavioral change is often associated with issues of medical importance, there are many non medical reasons that behavioral change may occur. One example is the noted change that happens in an individual as they go through the stages of grief. Despite a prolonged alteration in the way that one behaves, normalcy does usually return to an individual without any type of medical intervention. Another reason for such a change could be an altered schedule, or work-related stress. Such levels of stress may not qualify as medically necessary, and thus may be handled with preventative care. Such preventative care can include exercise, a good social support group, and a nutritious diet. While this type of behavioral change does not always require medical attention, individuals should seek professional help if they notice that these behavioral changes are especially maladaptive, or if they last longer than usual.
