= Parkinson's disease dementia =

Form of dementia associated with Parkinson's disease

Parkinson's disease dementia (PDD) is dementia that is associated with Parkinson's disease (PD). Together with dementia with Lewy bodies (DLB), it is one of the Lewy body dementias characterized by abnormal deposits of Lewy bodies in the brain.

Parkinson's disease starts as a movement disorder, but progresses in most cases to include dementia and changes in mood and behavior. The signs, symptoms and cognitive profile of PDD are similar to those of DLB; DLB and PDD are clinically similar after dementia occurs in Parkinson's disease. Parkinson's disease is a risk factor for PDD; it speeds up decline in cognition leading to PDD. Up to 78% of people with PD have dementia. Delusions in PDD are less common than in DLB, and persons with PD are typically less caught up in their visual hallucinations than those with DLB. There is a higher incidence of tremor at rest in PD than in DLB, and signs of parkinsonism in PDD are less symmetrical than in DLB.

== Diagnosis ==
Parkinson's disease dementia can only be definitively diagnosed after death with an autopsy of the brain. The 2017 Fourth Consensus Report established diagnostic criteria for PDD and DLB. The diagnostic criteria are the same for both conditions, except that PDD is distinguished from DLB by the time frame in which dementia symptoms appear relative to parkinsonian symptoms. DLB is diagnosed when cognitive symptoms begin before or at the same time as parkinsonism. Parkinson's disease dementia is the diagnosis when Parkinson's disease is well established before the dementia occurs; that is, the onset of dementia is more than a year after the onset of parkinsonian symptoms.

== Treatment ==
Cognitive behavioral therapy can help people with Parkinson's disease with parkinsonian pain, insomnia, depression, anxiety, and impulse disorders, if those interventions are properly adapted to the motor, cognitive and executive dysfunctions seen in Parkinson's disease, including Parkinson's dementia.

== Pathophysiology ==
Parkinson's disease dementia may have a mechanistic basis in neuroinflammation and alpha-synuclein aggregation involving the spreading of misfolded alpha-synuclein aggregates. After initiation of neuroinflammation, IL-1β cytokines and CD4^{+} T-cells are hypothesized to activate to amplify the pro-inflammatory response of neurons that promotes neuronal dysfunction resulting in dementia.

One hypothesis is that harmful environmental factors, such as toxins, infections, and poor lifestyle-factors, have been linked to triggering oxidative stress, inflammation, and selective vulnerability of dopaminergic neurons, which can lead to senescence, a state of permanent non-proliferation, or complete cell death. Through senescence of neurons, alpha-synuclein pathology spreads, which amplifies inflammation, which leads to cognitive decline in PDD patients. It has been proposed that when Lewy body disease is in an advanced stage where alpha-synuclein pathology spreads and neuronal degeneration appears, PDD may develop. In this hypothesis, a primary pathway toward progression of PDD is described to begin at the olfactory and limbic regions, which will cause parkinsonian motor symptoms and slowly progress to PDD. Alpha-synuclein aggregation can begin in the olfactory bulb and travel to the limbic system. A "brain-first" model and "body-first" model of the progression of PDD have been proposed to describe routes of alpha-synuclein pathology. The "body-first" model of PDD connects enzymatic GBA mutations and ingestion of external toxicants, like contaminated food or water, to the spreading of alpha-synuclein pathology via the vagus nerve and sympathetic pathways to the brainstem and peripheral organs from the enteric nervous system. The "brain-first" model that induces slower progression of PDD connects LRRK2 mutations and inhaled external toxicants, like airborne pesticides and pollutants, to the spread of neuronal senescence and alpha-synuclein pathology from limbic regions to the brainstem and the substantia nigra.

External environmental factors have been linked to inducing glial dysfunction and senescence. When glial cells encounter a harmful environmental factor, they express a pro-inflammatory response and oxidative stress. Air pollution as a harmful environmental factor has been linked to increased alpha-synuclein pathology, which promotes neuroinflammation. Infections, such as periodontitis, as a harmful environmental factor can trigger an immune response and promote neuroinflammation. Bacterial infections lead to IL-1β cytokine release, which can produce oxidative stress that promotes neuroinflammation. The promotion and occurrence of neuroinflammation has been important in predicting possible neurodegenerativity.

== Society and culture ==
General awareness about LBD lags well behind that of Parkinson's and Alzheimer's diseases, even though LBD is the second most common neurodegenerative dementia, after Alzheimer's.
