= Hypophonia =

Very soft speech

Hypophonia is soft speech, especially resulting from a lack of coordination in the vocal musculature. This condition is a common presentation in Parkinson's disease. This condition is generally treated with voice training programs, use of shorter sentences, breathing exercises, and muscle training exercises for vocal cords.
