= Lewy Body Dementia Association =

US nonprofit organization

The Lewy Body Dementia Association (LBDA) is a US nonprofit organization based in Lilburn, Georgia, and "dedicated to raising awareness of the Lewy body dementias (LBD), supporting people with LBD, their families and caregivers and promoting scientific advances".

Through "outreach, education and research", their mission is to support people affected by LBD.

== Work ==
According to a 2014 review, the LBDA provides services that aid society and families with LBD. They provide support and awareness, reduce stress on individuals and families with LBD, and may reduce use of healthcare. They help enable better diagnoses and better understanding of LBD.

A 2013 journal review of treatment of dementia with Lewy bodies suggests that caregivers join support groups including the LBDA for helpful information.

In 2018, the LBDA launched a collaboration of 24 US Research Centers of Excellence, coordinated by Mayo Clinic.

== History ==
The LBDA developed in 2003 out of an online support group. In 2008, it launched a network of support groups throughout the US.
