= Kenji Kosaka (psychiatrist) =

Japanese psychiatrist (1939–2023)

- 小阪 憲司
- Born: 1939; Ise, Mie, Japan
- Died: March 16, 2023 (aged 83)
- Education: Kanazawa University
- Known for: Dementia with Lewy bodies
- Awards: Asahi Prize (2013)
- Scientific career
- Fields: Psychiatry; Neuroscience
- Workplaces: Yokohama City University

Kenji Kosaka (小阪 憲司, Kosaka Kenji; 1939 – March 16, 2023) was a Japanese psychiatrist, known for his pioneer research on Dementia with Lewy bodies (DLB), which he first described.

== Life and career ==
Kosaka was born in Ise, Mie, and completed his M.D. in 1965 from Kanazawa University. He was appointed a professor of psychiatry at Yokohama City University School of Medicine in 1991, before becoming a director of Yokohama City University Medical Center in 1995. He was a director of Medical Care Court Clinic in Yokohama since 2011.

Kosaka received the 2013 Asahi Prize for discovering Dementia with Lewy bodies.

Kosaka died from aspiration pneumonia on March 16, 2023, at the age of 83.

== Contribution ==
In 1976, Kosaka described the disease Dementia with Lewy bodies for the first time. Two years later, he reported three autopsied cases of Dementia with Lewy bodies.

The term Dementia with Lewy bodies was proposed at the first international workshop held in 1995, and later came into common use.
