= Rivastigmine =

Chemical compound

- Molecular structure of rivastigmine

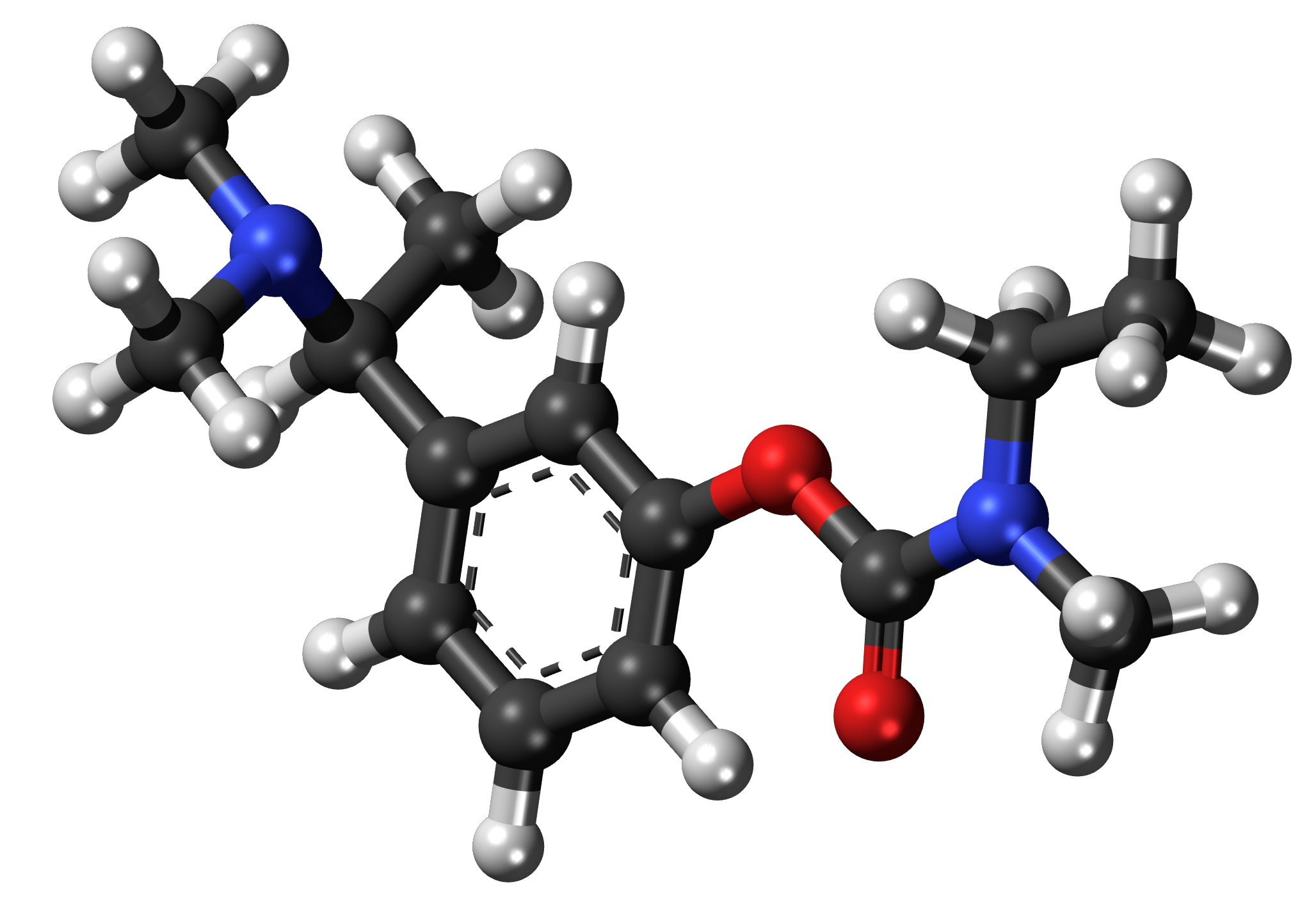
- 3D representation of a rivastigmine molecule

Clinical data
- Trade names: Exelon, others
- AHFS/Drugs.com: Monograph
- MedlinePlus: a602009
- License data: US DailyMed: Rivastigmine
- Pregnancy category: AU: B2
- Routes of administration: By mouth, transdermal
- Drug class: Acetylcholinesterase inhibitor
- ATC code: N06DA03 (WHO)

Legal status
- Legal status: AU: S4 (Prescription only); BR: Class C1 (Other controlled substances); CA: ℞-only; US: ℞-only; EU: Rx-only

Pharmacokinetic data
- Bioavailability: 60 to 72%
- Protein binding: 40%
- Metabolism: Liver, via pseudocholinesterase
- Elimination half-life: 1.5 hours
- Excretion: 97% in urine

Identifiers
- IUPAC name: (S)-3-[1-(dimethylamino)ethyl]phenyl N-ethyl-N-methylcarbamate
- CAS Number: 123441-03-2
- PubChem CID: 77991
- IUPHAR/BPS: 6602
- DrugBank: DB00989
- ChemSpider: 70377
- UNII: PKI06M3IW0
- KEGG: D03822
- ChEBI: CHEBI:8874
- ChEMBL: ChEMBL636
- CompTox Dashboard (EPA): DTXSID7023564
- ECHA InfoCard: 100.120.679

Chemical and physical data
- Formula: C_{14}H_{22}N_{2}O_{2}
- Molar mass: 250.342 g·mol^{−1}
- 3D model (JSmol): Interactive image
- SMILES: O=C(Oc1cc(ccc1)[C@@H](N(C)C)C)N(CC)C
- InChI: InChI=1S/C14H22N2O2/c1-6-16(5)14(17)18-13-9-7-8-12(10-13)11(2)15(3)4/h7-11H,6H2,1-5H3/t11-/m0/s1; Key:XSVMFMHYUFZWBK-NSHDSACASA-N

Rivastigmine, sold under the brand name Exelon among others, is an acetylcholinesterase inhibitor used for the treatment of dementia associated with Alzheimer's disease and with Parkinson's disease. Rivastigmine can be administered orally or via a transdermal patch; the latter form reduces the prevalence of side effects, which typically include nausea and vomiting.

Rivastigmine is eliminated through the urine, and appears to have relatively few drug-drug interactions.

It was patented in 1985 and came into medical use in 1997.

== Medical uses ==
Rivastigmine is indicated for the treatment of mild to moderate Alzheimer's dementia, and for mild to moderate Parkinson's disease dementia. Rivastigmine is available in capsules, liquid solution, and patches.

Rivastigmine has demonstrated treatment effects on the cognitive (thinking and memory), functional (activities of daily living) and behavioural problems commonly associated with Alzheimer's.

=== Efficacy ===
In people with either type of dementia, rivastigmine has been shown to provide meaningful symptomatic effects that may allow patients to remain independent and 'be themselves' for longer. In particular, it appears to show marked treatment effects in patients showing a more aggressive course of disease, such as those with younger onset ages, poor nutritional status, or those experiencing symptoms such as delusions or hallucinations. For example, the presence of hallucinations appears to be a predictor of especially strong responses to rivastigmine, both in Alzheimer's and Parkinson's patients. These effects might reflect the additional inhibition of butyrylcholinesterase, which is implicated in symptom progression and might provide added benefits over acetylcholinesterase-selective drugs in some patients. Multiple-infarct dementia patients may show slight improvement in executive functions and behaviour. No firm evidence supports usage in schizophrenia patients.

Its efficacy is similar to donepezil and tacrine. Doses below 6 mg/d may be ineffective. The effects of this kind of drug in different kinds of dementia (including Alzheimer's dementia) are modest, and it is still unclear which AChE (BChE) esterase inhibitor is better in Parkinson's dementia, though rivastigmine is well-studied.

== Side effects ==
Side effects may include nausea and vomiting, decreased appetite and weight loss.

The strong potency of rivastigmine, provided by its dual inhibitory mechanism, has been postulated to lead to more nausea and vomiting during the titration phase of oral rivastigmine treatment.

In a large clinical trial of the rivastigmine patch in 1,195 patients with Alzheimer's disease, the target dose of 9.5 mg/24-hour patch provided similar clinical effects (e.g. memory and thinking, activities of daily living, concentration) as the highest doses of rivastigmine capsules, but with one-third fewer reports of nausea and vomiting.

Usage of rivastigmine was associated with a higher frequency of reports of death as an adverse event in the Food and Drug Administration Adverse Event Reporting System database compared to the other acetylcholinesterase inhibiting drugs donepezil and galantamine; this increase could be related to improper application of the transdermal patch, or because rivastigmine is more often used during advanced illness.

Rivastigmine can increase gastric acid; it is discontinued if there are signs of gastrointestinal bleeding, particularly in individuals using nonsteroidal anti-inflammatory drugs (NSAIDs) or who have a history of peptic ulcer disease.

== Administration ==
Rivastigmine tartrate is a white to off-white, fine crystalline powder that is both lipophilic (soluble in fats) and hydrophilic (soluble in water). It comes in a variety of administrations including a capsule, solution and a transdermal patch. Like other cholinesterase inhibitors, it requires doses to be increased gradually over several weeks; this is usually referred to as the titration phase.

== Pharmacology ==
=== Pharmacodynamics ===
Rivastigmine, a cholinesterase inhibitor, inhibits both butyrylcholinesterase and acetylcholinesterase (unlike donepezil, which selectively inhibits acetylcholinesterase). It is thought to work by inhibiting these cholinesterase enzymes, which would otherwise break down the brain neurotransmitter acetylcholine.

=== Pharmacokinetics ===
When given orally, rivastigmine is well absorbed, with a bioavailability of about 40% in the 3-mg dose. Pharmacokinetics are linear up to 3 mg twice daily, but nonlinear at higher doses. Elimination is through the urine. Peak plasma concentrations are seen in about one hour, with peak cerebrospinal fluid concentrations at 1.4–3.8 hours. When given by once-daily transdermal patch, the pharmacokinetic profile of rivastigmine is much smoother, compared with capsules, with lower peak plasma concentrations and reduced fluctuations. The 9.5 mg/24 h rivastigmine patch provides comparable exposure to 12 mg/day capsules (the highest recommended oral dose).

The compound does cross the blood–brain barrier. Plasma protein binding is 40%. The major route of metabolism is by its target enzymes via cholinesterase-mediated hydrolysis. Elimination bypasses the hepatic system, so hepatic cytochrome P450 (CYP) isoenzymes are not involved. The low potential for drug-drug interactions (which could lead to adverse effects) has been suggested as due to this pathway compared to the many common drugs that use the cytochrome P450 metabolic pathway.

A QbD driven HPLC method was developed for the quantification of rivastigmine in rat plasma and brain for its pharmacokinetics study.

== History ==
Rivastigmine was developed by Marta Weinstock-Rosin of the Department of Pharmacology at the Hebrew University of Jerusalem and sold to Novartis by Yissum for commercial development. It is a semi-synthetic derivative of physostigmine.
