= Frontotemporal dementia and parkinsonism linked to chromosome 17 =

- Other names: FTDP-17, Frontotemporal dementia with parkinsonism-17, Familial Pick's disease, Wilhelmsen-Lynch disease.
- This condition is inherited in an autosomal dominant manner.
- Specialty: Neurology
- Symptoms: Loss of inhibition, inappropriate emotional responses, restlessness, neglect of personal hygiene, dementia, hallucinations, delusions, Parkinson's-like features, semantic paraphasias, and echolalia.
- Usual onset: Forties or fifties.
- Causes: Mutations in the MAPT gene.
- Diagnostic method: Clinical criteria, molecular genetic analysis, and brain imaging.
- Differential diagnosis: Pick's disease, sporadic progressive supranuclear palsy, corticobasal degeneration, Parkinson-plus syndromes, dementia with Lewy bodies, Parkinson's disease, and multiple system atrophy.
- Treatment: Palliative and symptomatic interventions.
- Frequency: Estimated to affect 1 in 1 million people in the Netherlands.

Frontotemporal dementia and parkinsonism linked to chromosome 17 (FTDP-17) is an autosomal dominant neurodegenerative tauopathy and Parkinson plus syndrome. FTDP-17 is caused by mutations in the MAPT (microtubule associated protein tau) gene located on the q arm of chromosome 17, and has three cardinal features: behavioral and personality changes, cognitive impairment, and motor symptoms. FTDP-17 was defined during the International Consensus Conference in Ann Arbor, Michigan, in 1996.

== Signs and symptoms ==
FTDP-17 usually appears gradually. Individuals who have reached the fully developed stage of the disease exhibit an array of symptoms that include at least two of the three cardinal features of FTDP-17, which include behavioral and personality disturbances, cognitive deficits, and motor dysfunction.

FTDP-17 clinical features differ significantly among affected individuals, regardless of whether they inherit the same or distinct mutations. Even members of the same family, for instance, can have different clinical presentations.

In addition to other manifestations, the behavioral and personality abnormalities may include disinhibition, apathy, poor judgment, compulsive behavior, hyperreligiosity, alcoholism, illicit drug addiction, verbal and physical aggression, and abusive behaviors. Memory, orientation, and visuospatial function are relatively preserved during the early stages of the disease, despite cognitive disturbances. Initially, progressive speech difficulties with non-fluent aphasia and executive function disorders can be seen. Memory, orientation, and visuospatial functions deteriorate as a result, while echolalia, palilalia, verbal and vocal perseverations develop. Eventually, mutism and progressive dementia set in.

Parkinsonism can be the first symptom of the disease, and it is noteworthy that some FTDP-17 patients have been misdiagnosed with Parkinson's disease or sporadic progressive supranuclear palsy. However, in some families, the parkinsonism appears later in the progression of the illness or not at all. FTDP-17 parkinsonism is distinguished by symmetrical bradykinesia, postural instability, rigidity affecting both axial and appendicular musculature, a lack of resting tremor, as well as poor or no response to levodopa therapy. Other motor disturbances seen in FTDP-17 include dystonia unrelated to medication, supranuclear gaze palsy, both lower and upper motor neuron dysfunction, myoclonus, postural and action tremors, eyelid closing and opening apraxia, dysphagia, and dysarthria.

== Cause ==
MAPT mutations account for up to 50% of FTDP-17 cases. More than 50 pathogenic MAPT mutations have been identified. FTDP-17 is inherited in an autosomal dominant manner.

== Pathophysiology ==
The disorder's pathogenetic mechanisms are believed to be associated with a changed ratio of tau isoforms or with tau's capacity to bind microtubules and facilitate microtubule assembly.

== Diagnosis ==
A combination of characteristic clinical and pathological features, as well as molecular genetic analysis, is required for a definitive diagnosis of FTDP-17. Genetic counseling should be provided to affected and at-risk individuals; penetrance is incomplete for the majority of subtypes.

Clinically, FTDP-17 may resemble a number of neurodegenerative diseases. FTDP-17 is frequently confused with Pick's disease, sporadic progressive supranuclear palsy (PSP), or corticobasal degeneration (CBD) in the absence of a positive family history or molecular genetic data. Other familial frontotemporal dementias, Parkinson's disease (PD), and multiple system atrophy (MSA) should be ruled out.

== Management ==
Currently, treatment for FTDP-17 is only symptomatic and supportive.

== Prognosis ==
Individual patients' and genetic kindreds' prognoses and rates of disease progression vary greatly, ranging from several months to several years, and in exceptional cases, as long as two decades.

== Epidemiology ==
Although the prevalence and incidence are unknown, FTDP-17 is a very rare condition. Over 100 families worldwide have been identified with 38 different tau gene mutations. The FTDP-17 phenotype varies not only between families with different mutations but also between and within families with the same mutations.
