= Corticobasal syndrome =

Medical condition

Corticobasal syndrome (CBS) is a rare, progressive atypical Parkinsonism syndrome and is a tauopathy related to frontotemporal dementia. CBS is typically caused by the deposit of tau proteins forming in different areas of the brain.

== Classification ==
CBS is the most common type of corticobasal degeneration (CBD) although the terms CBD and CBS have been used interchangeably in the past. The other three phenotypes of CBD are:

- frontal-behavioral dysexecutive-spatial syndrome (FBS)
- nonfluent/agrammatic variant of primary progressive aphasia (naPPA), and
- progressive supranuclear palsy (PSP).

== Symptoms and signs ==
Symptoms of CBS include apraxia, alien limb phenomenon, frontal deficits, and extrapyramidal motor symptoms such as myoclonus or rigidity. Movement deficits often begin on one side and progress to the other.

== Pathophysiology ==
CBD is the pathology underlying approximately 50% of CBS cases.

== Diagnosis ==
The Armstrong criteria were proposed in 2013; the accuracy of these is limited and further research is needed. Symptoms may be symmetric or asymmetric, with one or more of the following:

1. limb rigidity or akinesia
2. limb dystonia
3. limb myoclonus, plus one of:
4. orobuccal or limb apraxia
5. cortical sensory deficit
6. alien limb phenomena (more than simple levitation)

The onset is insidious with gradual progression, lasting one year or more, with no exclusion criteria present. The diagnosis is more likely if onset is after age 50, there is no family history (2 or more relatives), and there is no genetic mutation affecting T (e.g., MAPT).

Probably sporadic CBS is more likely if there are two of:

1. limb rigidity or akinesia
2. limb dystonia
3. limb myoclonus
- plus two of:
1. orobuccal or limb apraxia,
2. cortical sensory deficit
3. alien limb phenomena (more than simple levitation)

The diagnosis is excluded if there is evidence of:

- Lewy body disease
- multiple system atrophy
- Alzheimer's disease
- amyotrophic lateral sclerosis
- semantic or logopenic variant primary progressive aphasia
- structural lesion suggestive of focal cause
- granulin mutation or reduced plasma progranulin levels
- TDP-43 or fused in sarcoma (FUS) mutations

The diagnostic criteria for clinical use may result in a misdiagnosis of other tau-based diseases.

The probable criteria are proposed for clinical research.

=== Differential ===
Other degenerative pathologies that can cause corticobasal syndrome include:

- Alzheimer's disease
- Pick's disease with Pick bodies
- Lewy body dementias
- Neurofilament inclusion body disease
- Creutzfeldt–Jakob disease
- Frontotemporal degeneration due to progranulin gene mutation
- Motor neuron disease‐inclusion dementia.

The symptoms of classic CBS differ from CBD in that CBD also includes cognitive deficits in the executive functions.

== Prognosis ==
The average survival time after disease onset is estimated at 6.5 years.
