= Corticobasal degeneration =

Rare neurodegenerative disease

- Basal ganglia along with cerebral cortex are involved in this condition.
- Specialty: Neurology

Corticobasal degeneration (CBD) is a rare neurodegenerative disease involving the cerebral cortex and the basal ganglia. CBD symptoms typically begin in people from 50 to 70 years of age, and typical survival before death is eight years. It is characterized by marked disorders in movement and cognition, and is classified as one of the Parkinson plus syndromes. Diagnosis is difficult, as symptoms are often similar to those of other disorders, such as Parkinson's disease, progressive supranuclear palsy, and dementia with Lewy bodies, and a definitive diagnosis of CBD can only be made upon neuropathologic examination.

== Signs and symptoms ==
Because CBD is progressive, a standard set of diagnostic criteria can be used, which is centred on the disease's evolution. Included in these fundamental features are problems with cortical processing, dysfunction of the basal ganglia, and a sudden and detrimental onset. Psychiatric and cognitive dysfunctions, although present in CBD, are much less prevalent and lack establishment as common indicators of the presence of the disease.

Although corticobasal degeneration has a plethora of symptoms, some are more prevalent than others. In a study of 147 patients with CBD, it was found that all of them had at least one Parkinsonian sign, 95% having two and 93% had some higher order dysfunction (cognitive impairments like acalculia, sensory loss, dementia, neglect, etc.). In a separate study of 14 patients recorded three years after the onset of symptoms, many patients had high numbers of motor symptoms: 71% had bradykinesia (slow movements), 64% showed apraxia, 43% reported limb dystonia, and although more cognitive 36% had dementia. In another study of 36, over half had a useless/alien arm and 27% had a gait impediment. From this, it can be seen why CBD is hard to diagnose. Even if it can be distinguished as different from one of the other similar diseases, the varying combinations of symptoms create a difficult path to diagnosis.

=== Motor and associated cortical dysfunctions ===
Some of the most prevalent symptom types in people exhibiting CBD pertain to identifiable movement disorders and problems with cortical processing. These symptoms are initial indicators of the presence of the disease. Each of the associated movement complications typically appears asymmetrically and the symptoms are not observed uniformly throughout the body. For example, a person exhibiting an alien hand syndrome (explained later) in one hand, will not correspondingly display the same symptom in the other hand. Predominant movement disorders and cortical dysfunctions associated with CBD include:

- Parkinsonism
- Alien hand syndrome
- Apraxia (ideomotor apraxia and limb-kinetic apraxia)
- Aphasia

==== Parkinsonism ====
The presence of parkinsonism as a clinical symptom of CBD is largely responsible for complications in developing unique diagnostic criteria for the disease. Other such diseases in which parkinsonism forms an integral diagnostic characteristic are Parkinson's disease (PD) and progressive supranuclear palsy (PSP). Parkinsonism in CBD is largely present in an extremity such as the arm, and is always asymmetric. It has been suggested that the non-dominant arm is involved more often. Common associated movement dysfunctions that comprise parkinsonism are rigidity, bradykinesia, and gait disorder, with limb rigidity forming the most typical manifestation of parkinsonism in CBD. Despite being relatively indistinct, this rigidity can lead to disturbances in gait and correlated movements. Bradykinesia in CBD occurs when there is notable slowing in the completion of certain movements in the limbs. In an associated study, it was determined that, three years following first diagnosis, 71% of persons with CBD demonstrate the presence of bradykinesia.

==== Alien hand syndrome ====
Alien hand syndrome has been shown to be prevalent in roughly 60% of people diagnosed with CBD. This disorder involves the failure of an individual to control the movements of their hand, which results from the sensation that the limb is "foreign". The movements of the alien limb are a reaction to external stimuli and do not occur sporadically or without stimulation. The presence of an alien limb has a distinct appearance in CBD, in which the diagnosed individual may have a "tactile mitgehen". This mitgehen (German, meaning "to go with") is relatively specific to CBD, and involves the active following of an experimenter's hand by the subject's hand when both hands are in direct contact. Another, rarer form of alien hand syndrome has been noted in CBD, in which an individual's hand displays an avoidance response to external stimuli. Additionally, sensory impairment, revealed through limb numbness or the sensation of prickling, may also concurrently arise with alien hand syndrome, as both symptoms are indicative of cortical dysfunction. Like most of the movement disorders, alien hand syndrome also presents asymmetrically in those diagnosed with CBD.

==== Apraxia ====
Ideomotor apraxia (IMA), although clearly present in CBD, often manifests atypically due to the additional presence of bradykinesia and rigidity in those individuals exhibiting the disorders. The IMA symptom in CBD is characterized by the inability to repeat or mimic particular movements (whether significant or random) both with or without the implementation of objects. This form of IMA is present in the hands and arms, while IMA in the lower extremities may cause problems with walking. Those with CBD that exhibit IMA may appear to have trouble initiating walking, as the foot may appear to be fixed to floor. This can cause stumbling and difficulties in maintaining balance. IMA is associated with deterioration in the premotor cortex, parietal association areas, connecting white matter tracts, thalamus, and basal ganglia. Some individuals with CBD exhibit limb-kinetic apraxia, which involves dysfunction of finer motor movements often performed by the hands and fingers.

==== Aphasia ====
One or more of the following problems occurs in approximately half of the people with CBD. The symptoms are usually progressive, and can result in a complete loss of the ability to communicate. The presence or absence of these symptoms can help a neurologist make a more accurate diagnosis. Aphasia can be accompanied by dysarthria, Apraxia of speech, and cognitive problems. Aphasia is defined as difficulty with: speaking, understanding language, reading, and writing.

Aphasia can result in difficulty understanding more complex sentences, difficulty understanding articles or books, being unable to say specific words, using non-words and not recognizing it, long pauses trying to speak, abandoning speaking attempts, and difficulty spelling. Dysarthria is defined as weakness of the muscles associated with speaking including the mouth, throat, and breathing muscles. This results in slurred speech, speech that is too slow or too fast, and distorted or missing sounds in words. Apraxia of speech is defined as a disruption in the brain's ability to plan the movements needed to say words, resulting in difficulty initiating speech, errors in the sounds themselves, and errors sequencing the sounds or syllables in words. Apraxia causes long pauses trying to start speaking, an inability to start a word, oral groping, and mixed up sounds in words. Cognitive problems include but are not limited to memory loss, difficulty organizing thoughts, impulsivity, difficulty doing calculations, or difficulty planning, prioritizing, or self monitoring.

Another related problem is swallowing difficulty, called dysphagia. Dysphagia is diagnosed by x-ray or endoscopy of the throat while swallowing. Swallowing problems can progressively worsen, which compromises nutrition, hydration, and pulmonary health. Dysphagia can cause aspiration pneumonia, which is the leading cause of death in people with Parkinson's and PD+Plus disorders doi:10.1038/s41598-021-86011-w. Treatment for these problems can be addressed in speech and language therapy by a speech-language pathologist.

=== Psychiatric and cognitive disorders ===
Psychiatric problems associated with CBD often present as a result of the debilitating symptoms of the disease. Prominent psychiatric and cognitive conditions cited in individuals with CBD include dementia, depression, and irritability, with dementia forming a key feature that sometimes leads to the misdiagnosis of CBD as another cognitive disorder such as Alzheimer's disease (AD). Frontotemporal dementia can be an early feature.

== Molecular features ==
Neuropathological findings associated with CBD include the presence of astrocytic abnormalities within the brain and improper accumulation of the protein tau (referred to as tauopathy).

=== Astroglial inclusions ===
Postmortem histological examination of the brains of individuals diagnosed with CBD reveal unique characteristics involving the astrocytes in localized regions. The typical procedure used in the identification of these astroglial inclusions is the Gallyas-Braak staining method. This process involves exposing tissue samples to a silver staining material which marks for abnormalities in the tau protein and astroglial inclusions. Astroglial inclusions in CBD are identified as astrocytic plaques, which present as annular displays of blurry outgrowths from the astrocyte. A recent study indicated that produces a high density of astrocytic plaques in the anterior portion of the frontal lobe and in the premotor area of the cerebral cortex.

=== Tauopathy ===
The protein tau is an important microtubule-associated protein (MAP), and is typically found in neuronal axons. However, malfunctioning of the development of the protein can result in unnatural, high-level expression in astrocytes and glial cells. As a consequence, this is often responsible for the astrocytic plaques prominently noted in histological CBD examinations. Although they are understood to play a significant role in neurodegenerative diseases such as CBD, their precise effect remains a mystery.

In recent years corticobasal degeneration has come to be understood as a tauopathy. This is believed due to the most common indicator of CBD being a faulty tau protein. Tau proteins are integral in keeping microtubules stable; defective cells create four microtubule-binding repeats with increased affinity in binding with microtubules. Because of this increased affinity, they form insoluble fibers (also called "paired helical filaments"). Microtubules themselves keep the cell and cytoskeletal structure stable. Thus, when tau proteins create unnatural configurations, microtubules become unstable, which eventually leads to cell death.

== Diagnosis ==
New diagnostic criteria known as the Armstrong criteria were proposed in 2013, although the accuracy of these is limited and further research is needed.

Recent findings in clinicopathology have made it possible to distinguish CBD from Parkinson's and increase the accuracy of diagnosis, using developments in MRI and nuclear medicine.

=== Criteria ===
- Insidious onset and gradual progression
- Lasts 1 year or more
- Meets one of the four subtypes:
  - Possible CBS
  - FBS or NAV
  - PSPS plus at least one CBS feature other than limb rigidity or akinesia
- No Exclusion criteria present
- More likely if onset is after age 50
- More likely if no family history (2 or more relatives)
- More likely if no genetic mutation affecting T (e.g., MAPT)

==== Possible corticobasal syndrome subtype ====
Symptoms may be symmetric or asymmetric.

One or more of:

1. limb rigidity or akinesia
2. limb dystonia
3. limb myoclonus, plus one of:
4. orobuccal or limb apraxia
5. cortical sensory deficit
6. alien limb phenomena (more than simple levitation)

More likely (probable sporadic CBS) if:

- Asymmetric presentation
- Onset after age 50
- No family history (2 or more relatives)
- No genetic mutation affecting T (e.g. MAPT)
- plus two of:
1. limb rigidity or akinesia
2. limb dystonia
3. limb myoclonus
- plus two of:
1. orobuccal or limb apraxia,
2. cortical sensory deficit
3. alien limb phenomena (more than simple levitation)

==== Frontal behavioural-spatial syndrome subtype ====
Two of:

1. executive dysfunction
2. behavioural or personality changes
3. visuospatial deficits

==== NAV of primary progressive aphasia subtype ====
Effortful, agrammatic speech plus at least one of:

1. impaired grammar/sentence comprehension with relatively preserved single word comprehension or
2. groping, distorted speech production (apraxia of speech)

==== Progressive supranuclear palsy syndrome subtype ====
Three of:

1. axial or symmetric limb rigidity or akinesia
2. postural instability or falls
3. urinary incontinence
4. behavioural changes
5. supranuclear vertical gaze palsy or decreased vertical saccade velocity

==== Exclusion criteria ====
These apply to all types of CBD.

- Evidence of Lewy body disease
- multiple system atrophy
- Alzheimer's disease
- ALS
- semantic or logopenic variant primary progressive aphasia
- structural lesion suggestive of focal cause
- granulin mutation or reduced plasma progranulin levels
- TDP-43 or fused in sarcoma (FUS) mutations

The diagnostic criteria for clinical use may result in a misdiagnosis of other tau-based diseases.

The probable criteria are proposed for clinical research.

=== Clinical vs. postmortem ===
One of the most significant problems associated with CBD is the inability to perform a definitive diagnosis while an individual exhibiting the symptoms associated with CBD is still alive. A clinical diagnosis of CBD is performed based upon the specified diagnostic criteria, which focus mainly on the symptoms correlated with the disease. However, this often results in complications as these symptoms often overlap with numerous other neurodegenerative diseases. Frequently, a differential diagnosis for CBD is performed, in which other diseases are eliminated based on specific symptoms that do not overlap. However, some of the symptoms of CBD used in this process are rare to the disease, and thus the differential diagnosis cannot always be used.

Postmortem diagnosis provides the only true indication of the presence of CBD. Most of these diagnoses utilize the Gallyas-Braak staining method, which is effective in identifying the presence of astroglial inclusions and coincidental tauopathy.

=== Overlap with other diseases ===
Progressive supranuclear palsy (PSP) is frequently the disease most often confused with CBD. Both PSP and CBD result in similar symptoms, and both display tauopathies upon histological inspection. However, it has been noted that tauopathy in PSP results in tuft-shaped astrocytes in contrast with the ring-shaped astrocytic plaques found as a result of CBD.

Individuals diagnosed with PD often exhibit similar movement dysfunction as those diagnosed with CBD, which adds complexity to its diagnosis. Some other neurodegenerative diseases including Alzheimer's disease (AD), dementia with Lewy bodies (DLB), chronic traumatic encephalopathy (CTE) and frontotemporal dementia (FTD) also show commonalities with CBD.

=== Neuroimaging ===
The types of imaging techniques that are most prominently utilized when studying and/or diagnosing CBD are:

- magnetic resonance imaging (MRI)
- single-photon emission computed tomography (SPECT)
- fluorodopa positron emission tomography (FDOPA PET)

Developments or improvements in imaging techniques provide the future possibility for definitive clinical diagnosis prior to death. However, despite their benefits, information learned from MRI and SPECT during the beginning of CBD progression tend to show no irregularities that would indicate the presence of such a neurodegenerative disease. FDOPA PET is used to study the efficacy of the dopamine pathway.

Despite the undoubted presence of cortical atrophy (as determined through MRI and SPECT) in individuals experiencing the symptoms of CBD, this is not an exclusive indicator for the disease. Thus, the utilization of this factor in the diagnosis of CBD should be used only in combination with other clinically present dysfunctions.

==== MRI ====
MRI images are useful in displaying atrophied portions of neuroanatomical positions within the brain. As a result, it is especially effective in identifying regions within different areas of the brain that have been negatively affected due to the complications associated with CBD. To be specific, MRI of CBD typically shows posterior parietal and frontal cortical atrophy with unequal representation in corresponding sides. In addition, atrophy has been noted in the corpus callosum.

Functional MRI (fMRI) has been used to evaluate the activation patterns in various regions of the brain of individuals affected with CBD. Upon the performance of simple finger motor tasks, subjects with CBD experienced lower levels of activity in the parietal cortex, sensorimotor cortex, and supplementary motor cortex than those individuals tested in a control group.

==== SPECT ====
SPECT is currently being used to try to detect CBD. With many patients of CBD, there are areas in the basal ganglia which have difficulties receiving dopamine, typically asymmetrically. Specifically affected, are dopamine transporters which are presynaptic on the nigrostriatal cells. SPECT is used to detect these abnormalities in Dopamine transporters. Given that many patients have asymmetrical loss of function and metabolism this can help differentiate patients with CBD and those with Alzheimer's.

SPECT studies of individuals diagnosed with CBD involve perfusion analysis throughout the parts of the brain. SPECT evaluation through perfusion observation consists of monitoring blood release into different locations in tissue or organ regions, which, in the case of CBD, pertains to localized areas within the brain. Tissue can be characterized as experiencing overperfusion, underperfusion, hypoperfusion, or hyperperfusion. Overperfusion and underperfusion relate to a comparison with the overall perfusion levels within the entire body, whereas hypoperfusion and hyperperfusion are calculated in comparison to the blood flow requirements of the tissue in question. In general, the measurements taken for CBD using SPECT are referred to as regional cerebral blood flow (rCBF).

In general, SPECT reveals hypoperfusion within both the posterior regions of the frontal and parietal lobes. As in images gathered through MRI, SPECT images indicated asymmetry in the presentation of abnormalities throughout the brain. Additional studies have revealed the presence of perfusion anomalies in the thalamus, temporal cortex, basal ganglia, and pontocerebellar (from the pons to the cerebellum) locations within subjects' brains.

==== FDOPA PET ====
Research has suggested that the integrity of the dopamine system in the striatum has been damaged as an effect of CBD. Current studies employing the use of FDOPA PET scanning (FDOPA PET) as a possible method for identifying CBD have focused on analyzing the efficiency of neurons in the striatum that utilize the neurotransmitter dopamine. These studies have concluded that, in general, dopamine uptake was diminished in the caudate and the putamen. This characteristic also has the potential to be useful in distinguishing CBD from the similar PD, as individuals having been diagnosed with PD were more likely to have a lower uptake of dopamine than in individuals with CBD.

Other clinical tests or procedures that monitor the presence of dopamine within the brain (β-CIT SPECT and IBZM SPECT) have shown similar findings. β-CIT serves as an indicator for presynaptic dopaminergic neurons, whereas IBZM is a tracer that shows an affinity for the postsynaptic neurons of the same type. Despite agreement with other imaging studies, these two SPECT methods suffer some scrutiny due to better accuracy in other imaging methods. However, β-CIT SPECT has proven to be helpful in distinguishing CBD from PSP and multiple system atrophy (MSA).

=== Corticobasal syndrome ===
All of the disorders and dysfunctions associated with CBD can often be categorized into a class of symptoms that present with the disease of CBD. These symptoms that aid in clinical diagnosis are collectively referred to as corticobasal syndrome (CBS) or corticobasal degeneration syndrome (CBDS). Alzheimer's disease, Pick's disease, FTDP-17 and progressive supranuclear palsy can display a corticobasal syndrome. It has been suggested that the nomenclature of corticobasal degeneration only be used for naming the disease after it has received verification through postmortem analysis of the neuropathology. CBS patients with greater temporoparietal degeneration are more likely to have AD pathology as opposed to frontotemporal lobar degeneration.

== Treatment ==
Because the exact cause of CBD is unknown, there is no formal treatment for the disease. Instead, treatments focus on minimizing the appearance or effect of symptoms. The most easily treatable symptom of CBD is parkinsonism, most commonly treated with dopaminergic drugs. However, there is usually only moderate improvement, and the relief from the symptom is not long-lasting. In addition, palliative therapies, including the use of wheelchairs, speech therapy, and feeding techniques, are often used to alleviate many of the symptoms that are not improved by medication.

Many treatments have low success rates or have not been tested thoroughly or produced frequently. For example, in relation to the motor aspect of disability, CBD has high resistance against treatments to improve dopamine intake, such as levodopa. A number of studies have reported no real levels of improvement based on similar drugs/dopaminergic agonists. Because of the brain's levels of inhibition, some medications have focused on creating an inhibition that would negate the effect. Many of these relaxants and anticonvulsants have some success but also have unwanted side effects^{[21]}. Cognitive and associative effects of CBD are also hard to treat as the effects of many of the treatments for the symptomatic conditions that ensue such as dementia, aphasia, neglect, and apraxia are not well understood.

== Prognosis ==
The prognosis for an individual diagnosed with CBD is death within approximately eight years, although some patients have been diagnosed in 2000 but were still in relatively good condition in 2017, albeit with serious debilitation such as dysphagia, and overall limb rigidity. The partial (or total) use of a feeding tube may be necessary and will help prevent aspiration pneumonia, primary cause of death in CBD. Incontinence is common, as patients often can't express their need to go, due to eventual loss of speech. Therefore, proper hygiene is mandatory to prevent urinary tract infections.

== Epidemiology ==
Clinical presentation of CBD usually does not occur until age 60, with the earliest recorded diagnosis and subsequent postmortem verification being age 28. Although men and women present with the disease, some analysis has shown a predominant appearance of CBD in women. Current calculations suggest that the prevalence of CBD is approximately 4.9 to 7.3 per 100,000 people. CBD research has been limited by the rarity of the disease and the lack of research criteria. It is estimated to affect 0.6-0.9 per 100,000 per year.

Progressive supranuclear palsy (PSP) without CBD is estimated to be ten times more common. CBD represents roughly 4–6% of patients with Parkinsonism. Average age at disease onset is about 64, with the youngest confirmed onset being at age 43. There may be a slight female predominance.

== History ==
Corticobasal syndrome was first recognized in 1967 when Rebeiz, Kolodny, and Richardson Jr described three people with a progressive asymmetric akinetic-rigid syndrome combined with apraxia, which they named corticodentatonigral degeneration with neuronal achromasia. The condition was "mostly forgotten" until 1989, when Marsden et al. used the name corticobasal degeneration. In 1989 Gibb and colleagues provided detailed clinical and pathological descriptions in a further three cases adopting the name corticobasal degeneration, after which various other names included "corticonigral degeneration with nuclear achromasia" and "cortical basal ganglionic degeneration". Although the underlying cause of CBD is unknown, the disease occurs as a result of damage to the basal ganglia, specifically marked by neuronal degeneration or depigmentation (loss of melanin in a neuron) in the substantia nigra. Additional distinguishing neurological features of those diagnosed with CBD consist of asymmetric atrophy of the frontal and parietal cortical regions of the brain. Postmortem studies of patients diagnosed with CBD indicate that histological attributes often involve ballooning of neurons, gliosis, and tauopathy. Much of the pioneering advancements and research performed on CBD has been completed within the past decade or so, due to the relatively recent formal recognition of the disease.

The Office of Rare Diseases in the United States created the first criteria in 2002, and the Armstrong clinical diagnostic criteria were created in 2013.

== Society and culture ==
PSPA is a British charity, set up in 1994, which aims to "create a better future" for people with progressive supranuclear palsy (PSP) and CBD through information, support and research.

The Salt Path by Raynor Winn is an account of walking England's 630-mile South West Coast Path with her husband, whom Winn claims has corticobasal degeneration. This has been challenged by an investigation in The Observer.

== See also ==
- Frontotemporal lobar degeneration
