= Procerus sign =

- Other names: Vertical wrinkling of the forehead
- Differential diagnosis: progressive supranuclear palsy, Parkinson's disease

The procerus sign (vertical wrinkling of the forehead) is a medical sign consisting of vertical forehead wrinkling around the bridge of the nose and the glabella. This can be seen in neurodegenerative diseases such as progressive supranuclear palsy.

== Definition ==
The procerus sign is defined as wrinkling around the bridge of the nose and the glabella.

== Differential ==
The procerus sign can be seen in neurodegenerative diseases such as progressive supranuclear palsy (PSP). It is highly specific to PSP compared to other disorders involving Parkinsonism.

== Mechanism ==
Dystonia of the procerus muscle or the corrugator supercilii muscle leads to abnormal muscle contraction. It is present both when the eyes are open and when they are closed, including during blinking.

== History ==
The procerus sign may also be known as "vertical wrinkling of the forehead" because it often does not just involve the procerus muscle.
