= Alien hand syndrome =

Neuropsychiatric disorder

- Other names: Alien limb syndrome, Dr. Strangelove syndrome
- Specialty: Psychiatry, neurology

Alien hand syndrome (AHS) or alien limb syndrome is a category of conditions in which a person experiences their limbs acting seemingly on their own, without conscious control over the actions. There are a variety of clinical conditions that fall under this category, most commonly affecting the left hand. There are many similar terms for the various forms of the condition, but they are often used inappropriately. The affected person may sometimes reach for objects and manipulate them without wanting to do so, even to the point of having to use the controllable hand to restrain the alien hand. The occurrence of alien hand syndrome can be usefully conceptualized as a phenomenon reflecting a functional "disentanglement" between thought and action.

Alien hand syndrome is best documented in cases where a person has had the two hemispheres of their brain surgically separated, a procedure sometimes used to relieve the symptoms of extreme cases of epilepsy and epileptic psychosis, e.g., temporal lobe epilepsy. It also occurs in some cases after brain surgery, stroke, infection, tumor, aneurysm, migraine and specific degenerative brain conditions such as Alzheimer's disease, corticobasal degeneration and Creutzfeldt–Jakob disease. Other areas of the brain that are associated with alien hand syndrome are the frontal, occipital, and parietal lobes.

There are five types of alien hand syndrome: diagnostic dyspraxia, where one hand acts independently from the other; alien hand sign, where the person believes that the hand is not their own; anarchic hand syndrome, where the hand performs a task that the person has no control over; supernumerary hand, where the person feels that they have an extra limb; levitating hand, where the hand rises on its own.

== Signs and symptoms ==
"Alien behavior" can be distinguished from reflexive behavior in that the former is flexibly purposive while the latter is obligatory. Sometimes the affected person will not be aware of what the alien hand is doing until it is brought to their attention, or until the hand does something that draws their attention to its behavior. There is a clear distinction between the behaviors of the two hands in which the affected hand is viewed as "wayward" and sometimes "disobedient" and generally out of the realm of their own voluntary control, while the unaffected hand is under normal volitional control. At times, particularly in individuals who have sustained damage to the corpus callosum that connects the two cerebral hemispheres, the hands appear to be acting in opposition to each other.

A related syndrome described by the French neurologist François Lhermitte involves the release through disinhibition of a tendency to compulsively utilize objects that present themselves in the surrounding environment around the patient. The behavior of the patient is, in a sense, obligatorily linked to the "affordances" (using terminology introduced by the American ecological psychologist, James J. Gibson) presented by objects that are located within the immediate peri-personal environment.

This condition is known as utilization behavior. It is most often associated with extensive bilateral frontal lobe damage and might actually be thought of as "bilateral" alien hand syndrome in which the patient is compulsively directed by external environmental contingencies (such as the presence of a hairbrush on the table in front of them elicits the act of brushing the hair) and has no capacity to "hold back" and inhibit pre-potent motor programs that are obligatorily linked to the presence of specific external objects in the peri-personal space of the patient. When the frontal lobe damage is bilateral and generally more extensive, the patient completely loses the ability to act in a self-directed manner and becomes totally dependent upon the surrounding environmental indicators to guide their behavior in a general social context, a condition referred to as "environmental dependency syndrome".

To deal with the alien hand, some individuals engage in personification of the affected hand. Usually these names are negative in nature, from mild such as "cheeky" to malicious "monster from the moon". For example, Rachelle Doody and Jankovic described a patient who named her alien hand "baby Joseph". When the hand engaged in playful, troublesome activities such as pinching her nipples (akin to biting while nursing), she would experience amusement and would instruct baby Joseph to "stop being naughty". Furthermore, Bogen suggested that certain personality characteristics, such as a flamboyant personality, contribute to frequent personification of the affected hand.

Neuroimaging and pathological research shows that lesions of the frontal lobe (in the frontal variant) and corpus callosum (in the callosal variant) are the most common anatomical lesions responsible for the alien hand syndrome. These areas are closely linked in terms of motor planning and its final pathways.

The callosal variant includes advanced willed motor acts by the non-dominant hand, where individuals frequently exhibit "intermanual conflict" in which one hand acts at cross-purposes with the other "good hand". For example, one patient was observed putting a cigarette into her mouth with her intact, "controlled" hand (her right, dominant hand), following which her left hand rose, grasped the cigarette, pulled it out of her mouth, and tossed it away before it could be lit by the right hand. The patient then surmised that "I guess 'he' doesn't want me to smoke that cigarette." Another patient was observed to be buttoning up her blouse with her controlled dominant hand while the alien non-dominant hand, at the same time, was unbuttoning her blouse. The frontal variant most often affects the dominant hand, but can affect either hand depending on the lateralization of the damage to medial frontal cortex, and includes grasp reflex, impulsive groping toward objects or/and tonic grasping (in other words, difficulty in releasing grip).

In most cases, classic alien-hand signs derive from damage to the medial frontal cortex, accompanying damage to the corpus callosum. In these individuals, the main cause of damage is unilateral or bilateral infarction of cortex in the territory supplied by the anterior cerebral artery or associated arteries. Oxygenated blood is supplied by the anterior cerebral artery to most medial portions of the frontal lobes and to the anterior two-thirds of the corpus callosum, and infarction may consequently result in damage to multiple adjacent locations in the brain in the supplied territory. As the medial frontal lobe damage is often linked to lesions of the corpus callosum, frontal variant cases may also present with callosal form signs. Cases of damage restricted to the callosum however, tend not to show frontal alien-hand signs.

== Cause ==
The common emerging factor in alien hand syndrome is that the primary motor cortex controlling hand movement is isolated from premotor cortex influences but remains generally intact in its ability to execute movements of the hand.

A 2009 fMRI study looking at the temporal sequence of activation of components of a cortical network associated with voluntary movement in normal individuals demonstrated "an anterior-to-posterior temporal gradient of activity from supplemental motor area through premotor and motor cortices to the posterior parietal cortex". Therefore, with normal voluntary movement, the emergent sense of agency appears to be associated with an orderly sequence of activation that develops initially in the anteromedial frontal cortex in the vicinity of the supplementary motor complex on the medial surface of the frontal aspect of the hemisphere (including the supplementary motor area) prior to activation of the primary motor cortex in the pre-central gyrus on the lateral aspect of the hemisphere, when the hand movement is being generated. Activation of the primary motor cortex, presumed to be directly involved in the execution of the action via projections into the corticospinal component of the pyramidal tracts, is then followed by activation of the posterior parietal cortex, possibly related to the receipt of recurrent or re-afferent somatosensory feedback generated from the periphery by the movement which would normally interact with the efference copy transmitted from primary motor cortex to permit the movement to be recognized as self-generated rather than imposed by an external force. That is, the efference copy allows the recurrent afferent somatosensory flow from the periphery associated with the self-generated movement to be recognized as re-afference as distinct from ex-afference. Failure of this mechanism may lead to a failure to distinguish between self-generated and externally generated movement of the limb. This anomalous situation in which re-afference from a self-generated movement is mistakenly registered as ex-afference due to a failure to generate and successfully transmit an efference copy to sensory cortex, could readily lead to the interpretation that what is in actuality a self-generated movement has been produced by an external force as a result of the failure to develop a sense of agency in association with emergence of the self-generated movement (see below for a more detailed discussion).

A 2007 fMRI study examining the difference in functional brain activation patterns associated with alien as compared to non-alien "volitional" movement in a patient with alien hand syndrome found that alien movement involved anomalous isolated activation of the primary motor cortex in the damaged hemisphere contralateral to the alien hand, while non-alien movement involved the normal process of activation described in the preceding paragraph in which primary motor cortex in the intact hemisphere activates in concert with frontal premotor cortex and posterior parietal cortex presumably involved in a normal cortical network generating premotor influences on the primary motor cortex along with immediate post-motor re-afferent activation of the posterior parietal cortex.

Combining these two fMRI studies, one could hypothesize that the alien behavior that is unaccompanied by a sense of agency emerges due to autonomous activity in the primary motor cortex acting independently of premotor cortex pre-activating influences that would normally be associated with the emergence of a sense of agency linked to the execution of the action.

As noted above, these ideas can also be linked to the concept of efference copy and re-afference, where efference copy is a signal postulated to be directed from premotor cortex (activated normally in the process associated with emergence of an internally generated movement) over to somatosensory cortex of the parietal region, in advance of the arrival of the "re-afferent" input generated from the moving limb, that is, the afferent return from the moving limb associated with the self-generated movement produced. It is generally thought that a movement is recognized as internally generated when the efference copy signal effectively "cancels out" the re-afference. The afferent return from the limb is effectively correlated with the efference copy signal so that the re-afference can be recognized as such and distinguished from "ex-afference", which would be afferent return from the limb produced by an externally imposed force. When the efference copy is no longer normally generated, then the afferent return from the limb associated with the self-generated movement is mis-perceived as externally produced "ex-afference" since it is no longer correlated with or canceled out by the efference copy. As a result, the development of the sense that a movement is not internally generated even though it actually is (i.e. the failure of the sense of agency to emerge in conjunction with the movement), could indicate a failure of the generation of the efference copy signal associated with the normal premotor process through which the movement is prepared for execution.

Since there is no disturbance of the sense of ownership of the limb in this situation, and there is no apparent physical explanation for how the owned limb could be moving in a purposive manner without an associated sense of agency, a cognitive dissonance is created which may be resolved through the assumption that the goal-directed limb movement is being directed by an "alien" unidentifiable external force with the capacity for directing goal-directed actions of one's own limb.

=== Disconnection ===
It is theorized that alien hand syndrome results when disconnection occurs between different parts of the brain that are engaged in different aspects of the control of bodily movement. As a result, different regions of the brain are able to command bodily movements, but cannot generate a conscious feeling of self-control over these movements. As a result, the sense of agency that is normally associated with voluntary movement is impaired or lost. There is a dissociation between the process associated with the actual execution of the physical movements of the limb and the process that produces an internal sense of voluntary control over the movements, with this latter process thus normally creating the internal conscious sensation that the movements are being internally initiated, controlled and produced by an active self.

Recent studies have examined the neural correlates of emergence of the sense of agency under normal circumstances. This appears to involve consistent congruence between what is being produced through efferent outflow to the musculature of the body, and what is being sensed as the presumed product in the periphery of this efferent command signal. In alien hand syndrome, the neural mechanisms involved in establishing that this congruence has occurred may be impaired. This may involve an abnormality in the brain mechanism that differentiates between "re-afference" (the return of kinesthetic sensation from the self-generated "active" limb movement) and "ex-afference" (kinesthetic sensation generated from an externally produced 'passive' limb movement in which an active self does not participate). This brain mechanism is proposed to involve the production of a parallel "efference copy" signal that is sent directly to the somatic sensory regions and is transformed into a "corollary discharge", an expected afferent signal from the periphery that would result from the performance driven by the issued efferent signal. The correlation of the corollary discharge signal with the actual afferent signal returned from the periphery can then be used to determine if, in fact, the intended action occurred as expected. When the sensed result of the action is congruent with the predicted result, then the action can be labelled as self-generated and associated with an emergent sense of agency.

If, however, the neural mechanisms involved in establishing this sensorimotor linkage associated with self-generated action are faulty, it would be expected that the sense of agency with action would not develop as discussed in the previous section.

=== Loss of inhibitions ===
One theory posed to explain these phenomena proposes that the brain has separable neural "premotor" or "agency" systems for managing the process of transforming intentions into overt action. An anteromedial frontal premotor system is engaged in the process of directing exploratory actions based on "internal" drive by releasing or reducing inhibitory control over such actions.

A 2011 paper reporting on neuronal unit recording in the medial frontal cortex in human subjects showed a clear pre-activation of neurons identified in this area up to several hundred milliseconds prior to the onset of an overt self-generated finger movement and the authors were able to develop a computational model whereby volition emerges once a change in internally generated firing rate of neuronal assemblies in this part of the brain crossed a threshold. Damage to this anteromedial premotor system produces disinhibition and release of such exploratory and object acquisition actions which then occur autonomously. A posterolateral temporo-parieto-occipital premotor system has a similar inhibitory control over actions that withdraw from environmental stimuli as well as the ability to excite actions that are contingent upon and driven by external stimulation, as distinct from internal drive. These two intrahemispheric systems, each of which activates an opposing cortical "tropism", interact through mutual inhibition that maintains a dynamic balance between approaching toward (in other words, with "intent-to-capture" in which contact with and grasping onto the attended object is sought) versus withdrawing from (that is, with "intent-to-escape" in which distancing from the attended object is sought) environmental stimuli in the behavior of the contralateral limbs. Together, these two intrahemispheric agency systems form an integrated trans-hemispheric agency system.

When the anteromedial frontal "escape" system is damaged, involuntary but purposive movements of an exploratory reach-and-grasp nature – what Denny-Brown referred to as a positive cortical tropism – are released in the contralateral limb. This is referred to as a positive cortical tropism because eliciting sensory stimuli, such as would result from tactile contact on the volar aspect of the fingers and palm of the hand, are linked to the activation of movement that increases or enhances the eliciting stimulation through a positive feedback connection (see discussion above in section entitled "Parietal and Occipital Lobes").

When the posterolateral parieto-occipital "approach" system is damaged, involuntary purposive movements of a release-and-retract nature, such as levitation and instinctive avoidance – what Denny-Brown referred to as a negative cortical tropism – are released in the contralateral limb. This is referred to as a negative cortical tropism because eliciting sensory stimuli, such as would result from tactile contact on the volar aspect of the fingers and palm of the hand, are linked to the activation of movement that reduces or eliminates the eliciting stimulation through a negative feedback connection (see discussion above in section entitled "Parietal and Occipital Lobes").

Each intrahemispheric agency system has the potential capability of acting autonomously in its control over the contralateral limb although unitary integrative control of the two hands is maintained through interhemispheric communication between these systems via the projections traversing the corpus callosum at the cortical level and other interhemispheric commissures linking the two hemispheres at the subcortical level.

=== Disconnection of hemispheres due to injury ===
One major difference between the two hemispheres is the direct connection between the agency system of the dominant hemisphere and the encoding system based primarily in the dominant hemisphere that links action to its production and through to its interpretation with language and language-encoded thought. It is proposed that while relational action in the form of embodied inter-subjective behavior precedes linguistic capacity during infant development, a process ensues through the course of development through which linguistic constructs are linked to action elements in order to produce a language-based encoding of action-oriented knowledge.

When there is a major disconnection between the two hemispheres resulting from callosal injury, the language-linked dominant hemisphere agent which maintains its primary control over the dominant limb loses, to some degree, its direct and linked control over the separate "agent" based in the nondominant hemisphere, and the nondominant limb, which had been previously responsive and "obedient" to the dominant conscious agent. The possibility of purposeful action occurring outside of the realm of influence of the conscious dominant agent can occur and the basic assumption that both hands are controlled through and subject to the dominant agent is proven incorrect. The sense of agency that would normally arise from movement of the nondominant limb now no longer develops, or, at least, is no longer accessible to consciousness. A new explanatory narrative for understanding the situation in which the now inaccessible nondominant hemisphere based agent is capable of activating the nondominant limb is necessitated.

Under such circumstances, the two separated agents can control simultaneous actions in the two limbs that are directed at opposing purposes although the dominant hand remains linked to the dominant consciously accessible language-linked agent and is viewed as continuing to be under "conscious control" and obedient to conscious will and intent as accessible through thought, while the nondominant hand, directed by an essentially non-verbal agent whose intent can only be inferred by the dominant agent after the fact, is no longer "tied in" and subject to the dominant agent and is thus identified by the conscious language-based dominant agent as having a separate and inaccessible alien agency and associated existence. This theory would explain the emergence of alien behavior in the nondominant limb and intermanual conflict between the two limbs in the presence of damage to the corpus callosum.

The distinct anteromedial, frontal, and posterolateral temporo-parieto-occipital variants of the alien hand syndrome would be explained by selective injury to either the frontal or the posterior components of the agency systems within a particular hemisphere, with the relevant and specific form of alien behavior developing in the limb contralateral to the damaged hemisphere.

== Diagnosis ==
=== Corpus callosum ===
Damage to the corpus callosum can give rise to "purposeful" actions in the person's non-dominant hand (an individual who is left-hemisphere-dominant will experience the left hand becoming alien, and the right hand will turn alien in the person with right-hemisphere dominance).

In "the callosal variant", the patient's hand counteracts voluntary actions performed by the other, "good" hand. Two phenomena that are often found in individuals with callosal alien hand are agonistic dyspraxia and diagonistic dyspraxia.

Agonistic dyspraxia involves compulsive automatic execution of motor commands by one hand when the patient is asked to perform movements with the other hand. For example, when a patient with callosal damage was instructed to pull a chair forward, the affected hand would decisively and impulsively push the chair backwards. Agonistic dyspraxia can thus be viewed as an involuntary competitive interaction between the two hands directed toward completion of a desired act in which the affected hand competes with the unaffected hand to complete a purposive act originally intended to be performed by the unaffected hand.

Diagonistic dyspraxia, on the other hand, involves a conflict between the desired act in which the unaffected hand has been engaged and the interfering action of the affected hand which works to oppose the purpose of the desired act intended to be performed by the unaffected hand. For instance, when Akelaitis's individuals underwent surgery to the corpus callosum to reduce epileptic seizures, one patient's left alien hand would frequently interfere with the right hand. For instance, while trying to turn over to the next page with the right hand, his left hand would try to close the book.

In another case of callosal alien hand, the patient did not have intermanual conflict between the hands but rather from a symptom characterized by involuntary mirror movements of the affected hand. When the patient was asked to perform movements with one hand, the other hand would involuntarily perform a mirror image movement which continued even when the involuntary movement was brought to the attention of the patient, and the patient was asked to restrain the mirrored movement. The patient had a ruptured aneurysm near the anterior cerebral artery, which resulted in the right hand being mirrored by the left hand. The patient described the left hand as frequently interfering and taking over anything the patient tried to do with the right hand. For instance, when trying to grasp a glass of water with the right hand with a right side approach, the left hand would involuntary reach out and grasp hold of the glass through a left side approach.

More recently, Geschwind et al. described the case of a woman with severe coronary heart disease. One week after undergoing coronary artery bypass grafting, she noticed that her left hand started to "live a life of its own". It would unbutton her gown, try to choke her while asleep and would automatically fight with the right hand to answer the phone. She had to physically restrain the affected hand with the right hand to prevent injury, a behavior which has been termed "self-restriction". The left hand also showed signs of severe ideomotor apraxia. It was able to mimic actions but only with the help of mirror movements executed by the right hand (enabling synkinesis). Using magnetic resonance imaging (MRI), Geschwind et al. found damage to the posterior half of the callosal body, sparing the anterior half and the splenium extending slightly into the white matter underlying the right cingulate cortex.

Park et al. also described two cases of infarction as the origin of alien hand symptoms. Both individuals had had infarction of the anterior cerebral artery (ACA). One individual, a 72-year-old male, had difficulty controlling his hands, as they often moved involuntarily, despite his trying to stabilize them. Furthermore, he often could not let go of objects after grasping them with his palms. The other individual, a 47-year-old female with an ACA in a different location of the artery, complained that her left hand would move on its own and she could not control its movements. Her left hand could also sense when her right hand was holding an object and would involuntarily, forcibly take the object out of her right hand.

=== Frontal lobe ===
Unilateral injury to the medial aspect of the brain's frontal lobe can trigger reaching, grasping and other purposeful movements in the contralateral hand. With anteromedial frontal lobe injuries, these movements are often exploratory reaching movements in which external objects are frequently grasped and utilized functionally, without the simultaneous perception on the part of the patient that they are "in control" of these movements. Once an object has been acquired and is maintained in the grasp of this "frontal variant" form of alien hand, the patient often has difficulty with voluntarily releasing the object from their grasp and can sometimes be seen to be peeling the fingers of the hand back off the grasped object using the opposite controlled hand to enable the release of the grasped object (also referred to as tonic grasping or the "instinctive grasp reaction"). Some (for example, the neurologist Derek Denny-Brown) have referred to this behavior as "magnetic apraxia"

Goldberg and Bloom described a woman with a large cerebral infarction of the medial surface of the left frontal lobe in the territory of the left anterior cerebral artery which left her with the frontal variant of the alien hand involving the right hand. There were no signs of callosal disconnection nor was there evidence of any callosal damage. The patient displayed frequent grasp reflexes; her right hand would reach out and grab objects without releasing them. In regards to tonic grasping, the more the patient tried to let go of the object, the more the grip of the object tightened. With focused effort the patient was able to let go of the object, but if distracted, the behaviour would re-commence. The patient could also forcibly release the grasped object by peeling her fingers away from contact with the object using the intact left hand. Additionally, the hand would scratch at the patient's leg to the extent that an orthotic device was required to prevent injury. Another patient reported not only tonic grasping towards objects nearby, but the alien hand would take hold of the patient's penis and engage in public masturbation.

=== Parietal and occipital lobes ===
A distinct "posterior variant" form of alien hand syndrome is associated with damage to the posterolateral parietal lobe and/or occipital lobe of the brain. The movements in this situation tend to be more likely to withdraw the palmar surface of the hand away from sustained environmental contact rather than reaching out to grasp onto objects to produce palmar tactile stimulation, as is most often seen in the frontal form of the condition. In the frontal variant, tactile contact on the ventral surface of the palm and fingers facilitates finger flexion and grasp of the object through a positive feedback loop (i.e. the stimulus generates movement that reinforces, strengthens and sustains the triggering stimulation).

In contrast, in the posterior variant, tactile contact on the ventral surface of the palm and fingers is actively avoided through facilitation of extension of the fingers and withdrawal of the palm in a negative feedback loop (i.e. the stimulus, and even anticipation of stimulation of the palmar surface of the hand, generates movement of the palm and fingers that reduces and effectively counteracts and eliminates the triggering stimulation, or, in the case of anticipated palmar contact, decreases the likelihood of such contact). Alien movements in the posterior variant of the syndrome also tend to be less coordinated and show a coarse ataxic motion during active movement that is generally not observed in the frontal form of the condition. This is generally thought to be due to an optic form of ataxia since it is facilitated by the visual presence of an object with visual attention directed toward the object. The apparent instability could be due to an unstable interaction between the tactile avoidance tendency biasing toward withdrawal from the object, and the visually based acquisition bias tendency pushing toward an approach to the object.

The alien limb in the posterior variant of the syndrome may be seen to "levitate" upward into the air withdrawing away from contact surfaces through the activation of anti-gravity musculature. Alien hand movement in the posterior variant may show a typical posture, sometimes referred to as a "parietal hand" or the "instinctive avoidance reaction" (a term introduced by neurologist Derek Denny-Brown as an inverse form of the "magnetic apraxia" seen in the frontal variant, as noted above), in which the digits move into a highly extended position with active extension of the interphalangeal joints of the digits and hyper-extension of the metacarpophalangeal joints, and the palmar surface of the hand is actively pulled back away from approaching objects or up and away from supporting surfaces. The "alien" movements, however, remain purposeful and goal-directed, a point which clearly differentiates these movements from other disorganized non-purposeful forms of involuntary limb movement (e.g. athetosis, chorea, or myoclonus).

=== Similarities between frontal and posterior variants ===
In both the frontal and the posterior variants of the alien hand syndrome, the patient's reactions to the limb's apparent capability to perform goal-directed actions independent of conscious volition is similar. In both of these variants of alien hand syndrome, the alien hand emerges in the hand contralateral to the damaged hemisphere.

== Treatment ==
There is no cure for the alien hand syndrome. However, the symptoms can be reduced and managed to some degree by keeping the alien hand occupied and involved in a task, for example by giving it an object to hold in its grasp. Specific learned tasks can restore voluntary control of the hand to a significant degree. One patient with the "frontal" form of alien hand who would reach out to grasp onto different objects (e.g., door handles) as he was walking was given a cane to hold in the alien hand while walking, even though he really did not need a cane for its usual purpose. With the cane firmly in the grasp of the alien hand, it would generally not release the grasp and drop the cane in order to reach out to grasp onto a different object. Other techniques proven to be effective include; wedging the hand between the legs or slapping it; warm water application and visual or tactile contact. Additionally, Wu et al. found that an irritating alarm activated by biofeedback reduced the time the alien hand held an object.

In the presence of unilateral damage to a single cerebral hemisphere, there is generally a gradual reduction in the frequency of alien behaviors observed over time and a gradual restoration of voluntary control over the affected hand. Actually, when AHS originates from focal injury of acute onset, recovery usually occurs within a year. One theory is that neuroplasticity in the bihemispheric and subcortical brain systems involved in voluntary movement production can serve to re-establish the connection between the executive production process and the internal self-generation and registration process. Exactly how this may occur is not well understood, but a process of gradual recovery from alien hand syndrome when the damage is confined to a single cerebral hemisphere has been reported. In some instances, individuals may resort to constraining the wayward, undesirable and sometimes embarrassing actions of the impaired hand by voluntarily grasping onto the forearm of the impaired hand using the intact hand. This observed behavior has been termed "self-restriction" or "self-grasping".

In another approach, the patient is trained to perform a specific task, such as moving the alien hand to contact a specific object or a highly salient environmental target, which is a movement that the patient can learn to generate voluntarily through focused training in order to effectively override the alien behavior. It is possible that some of this training produces a re-organization of premotor systems within the damaged hemisphere, or, alternatively, that ipsilateral control of the limb from the intact hemisphere may be expanded.

Another method involves simultaneously "muffling" the action of the alien hand and limiting the sensory feedback coming back to the hand from environmental contact by placing it in a restrictive "cloak" such as a specialized soft foam hand orthosis or, alternatively, an everyday oven mitt. Other individuals have reported using an orthotic device to restrict perseverative grasping or restraining the alien hand by securing it to the bed pole. Of course, this can limit the degree to which the hand can participate in addressing functional goals for the patient and may be considered to be an unjustifiable restraint.

Theoretically, this approach could slow down the process through which voluntary control of the hand is restored if the neuroplasticity that underlies recovery involves the recurrent exercise of voluntary will to control the actions of the hand in a functional context and the associated experiential reinforcement through successful willful suppression of the alien behavior.

== History ==
The first known case described in the medical literature appeared in a detailed case report published in German in 1908 by the preeminent German neuro-psychiatrist, Kurt Goldstein. In this paper, Goldstein described a right-handed woman who had had a stroke affecting her left side from which she had partially recovered by the time she was seen. However, her left arm seemed as though it belonged to another person and performed actions that appeared to occur independent of her will.

The patient complained of a feeling of "strangeness" in relationship to the goal-directed movements of the left hand and insisted that "someone else" was moving the left hand, and that she was not moving it herself. When the left hand grasped an object, she could not voluntarily release it. The senses of touch and proprioception of the left side were impaired. The left hand would make spontaneous movements, such as wiping the face or rubbing the eyes, but these were relatively infrequent. With significant effort, she was able to move her left arm in response to spoken command, but conscious movements were slower or less precise than similar involuntary motions.

Goldstein developed a "doctrine of motor apraxia" in which he discussed the generation of voluntary action and proposed a brain structure for temporal and spatial cognition, will and other higher cognitive processes. Goldstein maintained that a structure conceptually organizing both the body and external space was necessary for object perception as well as for voluntary action on external objects.

In his classic papers reviewing the wide variety of disconnection syndromes associated with focal brain pathology, Norman Geschwind commented that Kurt Goldstein "was perhaps the first to stress the non-unity of the personality in individuals with callosal section, and its possible psychiatric effects".

== In popular culture ==
- In Stanley Kubrick's 1964 film Dr. Strangelove, the title character, played by Peter Sellers, apparently has alien hand syndrome, as he cannot stop himself from doing the Nazi salute. "Dr. Strangelove syndrome" was suggested as the official name for AHS. This was not approved, though it is sometimes used as an alternative name.
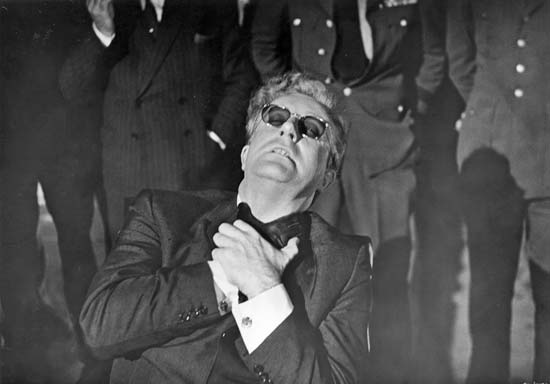
  Dr. Strangelove struggling to prevent his alien hand from strangling himself
- In the medical drama TV series House episode "Both Sides Now", a patient has alien hand syndrome.
- An episode of Dark Matters: Twisted But True – a documentary TV series on Discovery Science – described alien hand syndrome and traced its history.
- The 2017 Indian Tamil dark comedy film Peechankai is about a person with AHS.
- In Season 2 of the TV series Scream Queens, Dr. Brock Holt appears to have alien hand syndrome.
- In the Brazilian soap opera A Dona do Pedaço (2019), the character Eusébio, played by Marco Nanini, began to suffer from a "supernatural phenomenon" similar to AHS.
- In Season 7 of the TV series 9-1-1, LAFD Station 118 respond to a patient with AHS.
- In Season 1 episode 10 of the TV show Watson, Watson treats a man with Alien hand syndrome and must determine if he committed murder.
- In the comic strip Big Nate by Lincoln Pierce, the main character is seen at one point trying to fake alien hand syndrome as an excuse not to do his homework.

== See also ==
- Automatic writing
- Automatic drawing
- Automatic speech
- Bicameral mentality
- Divided consciousness
- Dual consciousness
- Ideomotor phenomenon
- Left brain interpreter
- Split-brain
- Surrealist automatism

== Works cited ==
- Bryant, Charles W. (September 12, 2007). "How Alien Hand Syndrome Works". HowStuffWorks.
- "Definition of Alien Hand Syndrome". MedicalNet.com. December 15, 2000. Archived from the original on August 16, 2014.
