= Apraxia of lid opening =

Human eyelid disorder

In ophthalmology, apraxia of lid opening (ALO) is an inability to initiate voluntary opening of the eyelid following a period of eyelid closure, with normal function at other times. Manual lifting of the eyelid often resolves the problem and the lid is able to stay open.

ALO was first clearly described as a distinct entity in 1965 as "a nonparalytic motor abnormality characterized by the patient's difficulty in initiating the act of lid elevation present only momentarily at the start of lid opening."

A review of reported cases has shown a 2:1 female to male occurrence, and onset usually in the sixth decade of life.

== Signs and symptoms ==
A person with ALO may complain of occasionally being unable to open the eye at will, typically after prolonged closure. Oftentimes, ALO only persists momentarily and the ptosis resolves upon manually lifting the eyelid. During attempted lid opening, there may be forceful frontalis muscle contraction, backward thrusting of the head, or opening of the mouth noted.

== Causes ==
The exact cause of ALO is not yet fully understood. Despite its name, it is not a true apraxia, but thought to be due to a supranuclear origin of abnormal neuronal activity. Voluntary eyelid opening involves the simultaneous activation of the levator palpebrae superioris muscle and the inhibition of the orbicularis oculi muscle. Electromyographic studies have shown that ALO may involve either involuntary levator palpebrae superioris muscle inhibition, persistent pretarsal orbicularis oculi muscle contraction, or both. Hypometabolism of glucose may play a part, and has been documented in the basal ganglia, frontal lobe, and the primary visual cortex in some cases of ALO.

While often an isolated condition, ALO sometimes occurs in conjunction with blepharospasm, which may complicate the diagnosis and treatment. Additionally, several diseases as well as medications have been reported in association with ALO. It has been reported in cases of extrapyramidal disorders, including Parkinson's disease, parkinsonism, progressive supranuclear palsy, hydrocephalus, motor neuron disease, Shy–Drager syndrome, and various lesions in the brain. Medications that have been associated include lithium, sulpiride, and a meperidine analog, 1-Methyl-4-phenyl-1,2,3,6-tetrahydropyridine.

== Diagnosis ==
ALO is often a benign and unilateral condition, and extensive evaluation may not be necessary. The diagnosis may be a clinical diagnosis based on a thorough history and physical exam, and being able to exclude other diagnoses and pathology. Computed tomography (CT) or magnetic resonance imaging (MRI) may be ordered to help determine whether there is a lesion or other pathological cause present in the brain or brainstem. Electromyography may be used to aid the diagnosis.

== Treatment ==
Botulinum toxin injected into the pretarsal orbicularis oculi muscle has been shown to be beneficial in some cases associated with orbicularis oculi contraction or blepharospasm. Levodopa has been reported to improve symptoms in patients with Parkinson's disease and progressive supranuclear palsy. There have also been reports of improvement with trihexyphenidyl and valproic acid. Surgical treatment may be considered in severe cases or cases that occur with blepharospasm.

== Prognosis ==
A person with isolated ALO has an excellent prognosis. Prognosis for ALO in association with other diseases depends on the underlying condition. When it is drug-induced, ALO may resolve within weeks to months upon cessation of the agent.

== See also ==
- Ptosis (eyelid)
- Blepharospasm
- Apraxia
- Myokymia
