= Parkinson-plus syndrome =

Parkinson-plus syndromes
- Other names: Disorders of multiple system degeneration
- Specialty: Neurology

Parkinson-plus syndromes (PPS) are a group of neurodegenerative diseases featuring the classical features of Parkinson's disease (tremor, rigidity, akinesia/bradykinesia, and postural instability) with additional features that distinguish them from simple idiopathic Parkinson's disease (PD). Parkinson-plus syndromes are either inherited genetically or occur sporadically.

Atypical parkinsonism and other Parkinson-plus syndromes are often difficult to differentiate from PD and each other. They include multiple system atrophy (MSA), progressive supranuclear palsy (PSP), and corticobasal degeneration (CBD). Dementia with Lewy bodies (DLB), may or may not be part of the PD spectrum, but it is increasingly recognized as the second-most common type of neurodegenerative dementia after Alzheimer's disease. These disorders are currently lumped into two groups, the synucleinopathies and the tauopathies. They may coexist with other pathologies.

Additional Parkinson-plus syndromes include Pick's disease and olivopontocerebellar atrophy. The latter is characterized by ataxia and dysarthria, and may occur either as an inherited disorder or as a variant of multiple system atrophy. MSA is also characterized by autonomic failure, formerly known as Shy–Drager syndrome.

== Presentation ==
Clinical features that distinguish Parkinson-plus syndromes from idiopathic PD include symmetrical onset, a lack of or irregular resting tremor, and a reduced response to dopaminergic drugs (including levodopa). Additional features include bradykinesia, early-onset postural instability, increased rigidity in axial muscles, dysautonomia, alien limb syndrome, supranuclear gaze palsy, apraxia, involvement of the cerebellum including the pyramidal cells, and in some instances significant cognitive impairment.

== Diagnosis ==
Accurate diagnosis of these Parkinson-plus syndromes is improved when precise diagnostic criteria are used. Since diagnosis of individual Parkinson-plus syndromes is difficult, the prognosis is often poor. Proper diagnosis of these neurodegenerative disorders is important as individual treatments vary depending on the condition. The nuclear medicine SPECT procedure using ^{123}I‑iodobenzamide (IBZM), is an effective tool in the establishment of the differential diagnosis between patients with PD and Parkinson-plus syndromes.

== Treatments ==
Parkinson-plus syndromes are usually more rapidly progressive and less likely to respond to antiparkinsonian medication than PD. However, the additional features of the diseases may respond to medications not used in PD.

Current therapy for Parkinson-plus syndromes is centered around a multidisciplinary treatment of symptoms.

== See also ==
- Frontotemporal dementia and parkinsonism linked to chromosome 17
