= Zelig =

1983 film by Woody Allen

- Theatrical release poster
- Directed by: Woody Allen
- Written by: Woody Allen
- Produced by: Robert Greenhut
- Starring: Woody Allen; Mia Farrow
- Cinematography: Gordon Willis
- Edited by: Susan E. Morse
- Music by: Dick Hyman
- Production company: Orion Pictures
- Distributed by: Warner Bros.
- Release date: July 15, 1983
- Running time: 79 minutes
- Country: United States
- Language: English
- Box office: $11.8 million

Zelig is a 1983 American satirical mockumentary comedy film written by, directed by, and starring Woody Allen as Leonard Zelig, a nondescript enigma, who apparently out of his desire to fit in and be liked unwittingly takes on the characteristics of strong personalities around him. The film, presented as a documentary, recounts his period of intense celebrity during the 1920s, including analyses by contemporary intellectuals.

The film received critical acclaim and was nominated for numerous awards, including the Academy Awards for Best Cinematography and Costume Design.

== Style ==
Zelig was photographed and narrated in the style of 1920s black-and-white newsreels, which are interwoven with archival footage from the era and re-enactments of real historical events. Color segments from the present day include interviews of real cultural figures, such as Saul Bellow and Susan Sontag, and fictional ones.

== Plot ==
During the Jazz Age of the 1920s, Leonard Zelig is a nondescript man who has the ability to transform his behavior and appearance to that of the people who surround him. He is first observed at a party by F. Scott Fitzgerald, who recounts that Zelig related to the affluent guests in a refined Boston accent and shared their Republican sympathies, but while in the kitchen with the servants, he adopted a coarser tone and claimed to be a Democrat. He is subsequently seen posing as a baseball player for the New York Yankees, a gangster, and a Black jazz trumpeter.

In 1928, after Zelig is reported missing by his landlady and his employer, the police find him in a Chinese establishment in Manhattan's Chinatown impersonating an Asian man and take him to a psychiatric hospital in a straitjacket. Upon arrival at the hospital, Zelig transforms back into Caucasian. When interviewed by psychiatrist Dr. Eudora Fletcher, (Note: Eudora Fletcher was the name of the principal of P.S. 99 in Brooklyn, New York, the elementary school Allen attended as a child.) Zelig claims to be a psychiatrist who has worked with Sigmund Freud. Fascinated with Zelig's case, Dr. Fletcher discovers through hypnosis that he yearns for approval so strongly that he physically changes to fit in with those around him. He soon gains national fame as the "human chameleon".

Zelig is suddenly removed from the hospital to be treated at home by his half-sister Ruth and her lover Martin Geist, a fraudulent businessman, who both exploit Zelig by turning him into a carnival attraction. He becomes the subject of a 1935 biographical film and several novelty songs, and his popularity spawns a variety of merchandise items. When Ruth is killed by Geist in a murder–suicide in 1929, Zelig goes missing again. While public interest in Zelig's disappearance quickly wanes, Dr. Fletcher continues to search for Zelig, who is found impersonating a Catholic priest in the entourage of Pope Pius XI at the Vatican and is deported back to the United States.

Interviewed in a contemporary color segment, psychologist Dr. Bruno Bettelheim opines that Zelig was not too dissimilar from "the well-adjusted, normal person", describing him as "the ultimate conformist".

Dr. Fletcher takes Zelig to her country house to treat him in a neutral environment away from society, while her cousin, Paul Deghuee, films their sessions. As Zelig continues to insist that he is a psychiatrist, Dr. Fletcher uses reverse psychology and asks "Dr. Zelig" for advice on how to deal with her need for approval, before claiming that she has been pretending to be a doctor to fit in with her friends. Finally, Zelig breaks down and admits he is not a doctor. Using hypnosis, Dr. Fletcher eventually cures Zelig of his compulsion to assimilate, but for a brief period, he goes to the other extreme, becoming overly opinionated while refusing to accept others' opinions.

Dr. Fletcher develops feelings for Zelig. Because of the media coverage of the case, both patient and doctor become national celebrities. Zelig and Dr. Fletcher announce their wedding, but when numerous women claim that Zelig was already married and had fathered children, dozens of lawsuits are filed against him for actions he took when under his various personalities. As Zelig faces intense public scrutiny, his illness returns, and he tries to fit in once more, before he disappears. Despite a worldwide manhunt, he cannot be found.

In 1932, Dr. Fletcher sees a newsreel that shows Zelig at a Nazi rally in Berlin. She sails to Europe and, after four weeks, finds him at a huge Nazi rally in Munich seated behind Adolf Hitler. Together, Zelig and Dr. Fletcher escape from SS officers after disrupting the event and fly back to the U.S., with Zelig transforming into a pilot and flying their plane upside down in record time. Back in New York City, they are hailed as heroes and marry to live a full and happy life together.

== Cast ==
- Woody Allen as Leonard Zelig
  - Garrett Brown as actor Leonard
- Mia Farrow as Dr. Eudora Nesbitt Fletcher
  - Ellen Garrison as older Eudora
  - Marianne Tatum as actress Eudora
- Patrick Horgan as the narrator
- Stephanie Farrow as Meryl Fletcher
  - Elizabeth Rothschild as older Meryl
- Will Holt as rally chancellor
- Sol Lomita as Martin Geist
- John Rothman as Paul Deghuee
  - Sherman Loud as older Paul
- Deborah Rush as Lita Fox
- Mary Louise Wilson as Ruth Zelig
- Peter McRobbie as workers rally speaker
- Mae Questel as the voice of Helen Kane (uncredited)

Susan Sontag, Irving Howe, Saul Bellow, Bricktop, Dr. Bruno Bettelheim, and Professor John Morton Blum appear as themselves.

== Production ==
Allen used newsreel footage, and inserted himself and other actors into it, using bluescreen technology. To provide an authentic look to his scenes, Allen and cinematographer Gordon Willis used a variety of techniques, including locating some of the antique film cameras and lenses used during the eras depicted in the film, and simulating damage, such as crinkles and scratches, on the negatives to make the finished product look more like vintage footage. All of the production sound was recorded on antique carbon microphones. The virtually seamless blending of old and new footage was achieved almost a decade before digital filmmaking technology made such techniques much easier to accomplish, as seen in films such as Forrest Gump (1994) and various television advertisements.

The film uses cameo appearances by real figures from academia and other fields for comic effect. Contrasting the film's vintage black-and-white film footage, these persons appear in color segments as themselves, commenting in the present day on the Zelig phenomenon as if it really happened. They include essayist Susan Sontag, psychoanalyst Bruno Bettelheim, Nobel Prize-winning novelist Saul Bellow, political writer Irving Howe, historian John Morton Blum, and the Paris nightclub owner Bricktop.

Also appearing in the film's vintage footage are Charles Lindbergh, Al Capone, Clara Bow, William Randolph Hearst, Marion Davies, Charlie Chaplin, Josephine Baker, Fanny Brice, Carole Lombard, Dolores del Río, Adolf Hitler, Joseph Goebbels, Hermann Göring, James Cagney, Jimmy Walker, Lou Gehrig, Babe Ruth, Adolphe Menjou, Claire Windsor, Tom Mix, Marie Dressler, Bobby Jones, and Pope Pius XI. Each of these public figures were represented in newsreel footage and many were also seamlessly portrayed by look-alike actors in the film.

In the time it took to complete the film's special effects, Allen completed A Midsummer Night's Sex Comedy (production started prior to the filming of Zelig) and filmed Broadway Danny Rose. This is Orion Pictures' last film to be released through Warner Bros.

== Release ==
Before being shown at the 40th Venice International Film Festival, the film opened on six screens in the United States and grossed US$60,119 on its opening weekend; it eventually earned US$11.8 million in North America.

== Reception ==
=== Critical response ===
On the review aggregator website Rotten Tomatoes, the film holds an approval rating of 97% based on 31 reviews, with an average rating of 8.1/10. The website's critics consensus reads: "Wryly amusing, technically impressive, and ultimately thought-provoking, Zelig represents Woody Allen in complete command of his craft".

In his review in The New York Times, Vincent Canby observed:

[Allen's] new, remarkably self-assured comedy is to his career what ... Berlin Alexanderplatz is to Rainer Werner Fassbinder's and ... Fanny and Alexander is to Ingmar Bergman's ... Zelig is not only pricelessly funny, it's also, on occasion, very moving. It works simultaneously as social history, as a love story, as an examination of several different kinds of film narrative, as satire and as parody ... [It] is a nearly perfect – and perfectly original – Woody Allen comedy.

Variety said the film was "consistently funny, though more academic than boulevardier", and The Christian Science Monitor called it "amazingly funny and poignant". Time Out described it as "a strong contender for Allen's most fascinating film", while TV Guide said, "Allen's ongoing struggles with psychoanalysis and his Jewish identity – stridently literal preoccupations in most of his work – are for once rendered allegorically. The result is deeply satisfying". Gene Siskel gave the film two stars out of four, calling it "a beautifully made but slight fable." Pauline Kael wrote that when the film was over "I felt good, but I was still a little hungry for a movie. There's a reason 'Zelig' seems small; there aren't any characters in it, not even Zelig."

Colin Greenland reviewed Zelig for Imagine magazine, and stated that "Woody Allen's most irresistable film for quite a while. He has found a new way to make fun of his own neuroses without exposing us to the egoism which became so overbearing in Manhattan or Stardust Memories."

It ranked 588th among critics, and 546th among directors, in the 2012 Sight & Sound polls of the greatest films ever made. Chris Nashawaty of Entertainment Weekly listed the work as one of Allen's finest, lauding it as "a spot-on homage to vintage newsreels and a seamless exercise in technique." The Daily Telegraph film critics Robbie Collin and Tim Robey also named it as a career highlight and argued, "The special effects, in which Allen is seamlessly inserted into vintage newsreels, are still astonishing, and draw out the aching tragicomedy of Zelig's plight. He's the original man who wasn't there." Calum Marsh of Slant magazine wrote, "We are infinitely pliable. That's the thesis of Zelig, Allen's wisest film, which has much to say about the way a person can be bent and contorted in the name of acceptance. Its ostensibly wacky conceit ... is grounded in an emotional and psychological reality all too familiar to shrug off as farce. We'll go very far out of our way to avoid conflict. Zelig seizes on that weakness and forces us to recognize it."

=== Accolades ===
- 56th Academy Awards
  - Academy Award for Best Cinematography (Gordon Willis, nominee)
  - Academy Award for Best Costume Design (Santo Loquasto, nominee)
- 37th British Academy Film Awards
  - BAFTA Award for Best Original Screenplay (nominee)
  - BAFTA Award for Best Cinematography (nominee)
  - BAFTA Award for Best Special Visual Effects (nominee)
  - BAFTA Award for Best Editing (nominee)
  - BAFTA Award for Best Makeup (nominee)
- Writers Guild of America Award for Best Comedy Written Directly for the Screen (nominee)
- National Society of Film Critics Award for Best Cinematography (Gordon Willis, nominee)
- 41st Golden Globe Awards
  - Golden Globe Award for Best Motion Picture - Musical or Comedy (nominee)
  - Golden Globe Award for Best Actor - Motion Picture Musical or Comedy (Woody Allen, nominee)
- Saturn Award for Best Direction (nominee)
- New York Film Critics Circle Award for Best Cinematography (winner)
- Kansas City Film Critics Circle Award for Best Supporting Actress (Mia Farrow, winner; tied with Linda Hunt for The Year of Living Dangerously)
- Belgian Film Critics Association: Grand Prix (winner)
- David di Donatello Award for Best Foreign Actor (Allen, winner)
- Venice Film Festival Pasinetti Award for Best Film (winner)
- Bodil Award for Best Non-European Film (winner)

== Soundtrack ==
- "Leonard the Lizard" (1983) – composed by Dick Hyman; sung by Bernie Kuce, Steve Clayton and Tony Wells
- "Doin' the Chameleon" (1983) – composed by Dick Hyman; sung by Bernie Kuce, Steve Clayton and Tony Wells
- "Chameleon Days" (1983) – composed by Dick Hyman; performed by Mae Questel
- "You May Be Six People, But I Love You" (1983) – composed by Dick Hyman; sung by Bernie Kuce, Steve Clayton and Tony Wells
- "Reptile Eyes" (1983) – composed by Dick Hyman; sung by Rose Marie Jun
- "The Changing Man Concerto" (1983) – composed by Dick Hyman
- "I've Got a Feeling I'm Falling" (1929) – music by Fats Waller (as Thomas 'Fats' Waller) and Harry Link; sung by Roz Harris
- "I'm Sitting on Top of the World" (1925) – music by Ray Henderson; sung by Norman Brooks
- "Ain't We Got Fun" (1921) – music by Richard A. Whiting; performed by The Charleston City All Stars
- "Sunny Side Up" (1929) – music and lyrics by Ray Henderson, Lew Brown and Buddy G. DeSylva; performed by The Charleston City All Stars
- "I'll Get By" (1928) – music by Fred E. Ahlert; performed by The Ben Bernie Orchestra
- "I Love My Baby, My Baby Loves Me" (1925) – music by Harry Warren; performed by The Charleston City All Stars
- "Runnin' Wild" (1922) – music by A. H. Gibbs; performed by The Charleston City All Stars
- "A Sailboat in the Moonlight" (1937) – written by Carmen Lombardo and John Jacob Loeb (as John Loeb); performed by The Guy Lombardo Orchestra
- "Charleston" (1923) – music by James P. Johnson; performed by Dick Hyman
- "Chicago (That Toddlin' Town)" (1922) – written by Fred Fisher; performed by Dick Hyman
- "Five Feet Two, Eyes of Blue" (1925) – music by Ray Henderson; performed by Dick Hyman
- "Anchors Aweigh" (1906) – music by Charles A. Zimmerman; modified by Domenico Savino (1950); performed by Dick Hyman
- "Take Me Out to the Ballgame" (1908) – music by Albert von Tilzer
- "The Internationale" (1888) – music by Pierre De Geyter

== See also ==
- Environmental dependency syndrome
- "The Belonging Kind"
- "Smiley Faces"
- The Pretender (TV series)
- List of films featuring fictional films
