= Ideational apraxia =

Neurological loss of ability to plan object use

Ideational apraxia (IA) is a neurological disorder which explains the loss of ability to conceptualize, plan, and execute the complex sequences of motor actions involved in the use of tools or otherwise interacting with objects in everyday life. Ideational apraxia is a condition in which an individual is unable to plan movements related to interaction with objects, because they have lost the perception of the object's purpose. Characteristics of this disorder include a disturbance in the concept of the sequential organization of voluntary actions. The patient appears to have lost the knowledge or thought of what an object represents. This disorder was first seen 100 years ago by Doctor Arnold Pick, who described a patient who appeared to have lost their ability to use objects. The patient would make errors such as combing their hair with the wrong side of the comb or placing a pistol in his mouth. From that point on, several other researchers and doctors have stumbled upon this unique disorder. IA has been described under several names such as, agnosia of utilization, conceptual apraxia or loss of knowledge about the use of tools, or Semantic amnesia of tool usage. The term apraxia was first created by Steinthal in 1871 and was then applied by Gogol, Kusmaul, Star, and Pick to patients who failed to pantomime the use of tools. It was not until the 1900s, when Liepmann refined the definition, that it specifically described disorders that involved motor planning, rather than disturbances in the patient’s visual perception, language, or symbolism.

== Signs and symptoms ==
Liepmann was the first to actually conduct tests on these patients in his laboratory. These tests are known as multiple-object tasks or MOT. Each task requires the patient to use more than one object; the researcher describes a task to the patient and asks them to execute that task as described. Liepmann gave the patients all the necessary articles, such as a candle and a matchbox, which were placed before the patient. He then observed the patients to see how they interacted with each object. In the case of the matchbox, one patient brought the whole box up next to the wick, instead of just one match. Another opened the box and withdrew a match, then brought it to the wick unlighted. Still another patient struck the candle against the striking surface on the matchbox. Thus Liepmann was able to witness the discontinuity of the patients' actions with respect to everyday objects and to categorize the errors that the patients made, namely: mislocation of actions, object misuse, omissions, perplexity, and sequence errors.

Even though afflicted persons are unable to correctly perform simple tasks using multiple items as provided, they are able to accurately identify the objects involved in simple tasks. For example, they are able to match a given sequence of photographs with the correct label, such as: the process of making coffee, buttering bread, or preparing tea. These patients are also able to successfully identify objects when a researcher verbally describes the function of the tool. Another test involves matching the appropriate object with its function. Finally, the fact that patients can identify the actions of a given tool from a sequence of photographs, shows that they completely understand object usage.

The deficit is therefore not that patients lack the knowledge of how to use an object; they fully understand the function of each tool. Rather, the problem lies in that, when they attempt to interact with the tools (in a multiple-object task) in order to execute those functions, that execution is flawed.

== Cause ==
The cause of IA is still somewhat of a mystery to most researchers because there is no localized focal point in the brain that shows where this deficit will occur. Since 1905 Liepmann proposed a hypothesis of an action processing system that is found in the left hemisphere of the brain, which is dedicated to skilled, motor planning that guides the movement of the body. Yet, he still was never able to produce two patients with the same brain damage that showed ideational apraxia. The major ideas of where IA is found are in the left posterior temporal-parietal junction. Possibly damage to the lateral sulcus also known as Sylvian fissure may contribute to an individual’s deterioration of object recognition. Another possible area of damage leading to IA is the submarginal gyrus, which is located in the parietal lobe of the brain. Overall, IA is an autonomous syndrome, linked to damage in the left hemisphere involving semantic memory disorders rather than a defect in motor control.

Several severe injuries or diseases can cause IA in a wide range of patients. Alzheimer's patients are the largest cohort groups that express IA. Other groups that are often seen with this dysfunction are stroke victims, traumatic brain injuries, and dementia. The damage is almost always found in the dominant hemisphere (i.e. usually the left hemisphere) of the patient.

== Pathophysiology ==
Ideational apraxia is characterized by the mechanism that the patient loses the “idea” of how they should interact with an object. Norman and Shallice came up with the dual-systems theory of the control of routine and willed behavior. According to this theory one system –contention scheduling is responsible for the control of routine action, while – supervisory attention is able to bias this system when willed control over the behavior is required.

Contention scheduling is a complicated set of processes that involve action schemas. These action schemas are what are used in the sequence of actions involved in making a cup of tea and situation specific factors such as whether a glass of lemonade is too bitter. Even simple tasks need the monitoring of goals: e.g., has sugar been added to a cup of coffee.

But as we learn new activities we are also learning new schemas. We all know how to open a jar of jelly or how to light a match. Schemas are needed in everyday life because they give purpose and goal to our behaviors. In each schema there are subgoals or components that make up the schema. An example would be the schema of lighting a match. There are three subgoals found in this schema: holding the match, holding the matchbox, and holding a lit match. More subgoals could be applied but those are the most obvious when the overall goal wanted is to light a match. That is why schemas form a hierarchy, with the more complicated and complex action sequences corresponding to high level schemas and low level schemas correlating with simple single object tasks.

As said earlier from Norman and Shallice the other component used in voluntary action is supervisory attention. Schemas cause the activation of behaviors; the greater the excitation of the activity the more easily it is to achieve the subgoals and complete the schema. Either top-down fashion activates schemas, where intentions are governed by some type of cognitive system, or by bottom-up fashion where features or an object in the environment trigger a schema to begin. The bottom-up feature is what is seen in ideational apraxia because an object appears to capture the attention of the patient. However, the schema that corresponds to the object cannot be fulfilled. For some reason there is a disconnect in the brain that does not allow the individual to produce the sequence of actions that they know should be happening with the object that is in their visual pathway. It is this area that is still an area of ambiguity to physicians and researchers alike. They are not sure where in the brain the action schema pathway is severed.

== Diagnosis ==
Ideational apraxia is difficult to diagnose. This is because the majority of patients who have this disorder also have some other type of dysfunction such as agnosia or aphasia. The tests used to make an IA diagnosis can range from easy single-object tasks to complex multiple-object tasks. When being tested, a patient may be asked to view twenty objects. They then have to demonstrate the use of each single object following three different ways of presenting the stimuli. The patient must then perform a complex test in which the examiner describes a task such as making coffee and the patient must show the sequential steps to make a cup of coffee. The patients are then scored on how many errors are seen by the examiner. The errors of the patients in performing the MOT were scored according to a set of criteria partly derived from De Renzi and Lucchelli.

=== Error classes ===
Two classes of errors are used to develop a diagnosis:

Class I: Sequence errors

- Action addition (AA) is a meaningful action step that is not necessary for accomplishing the goal of the MOT action (e.g., removing the filter of the orange squeezer in order to pour the liquid);
- Action anticipation (A) is an anticipation of an action that would normally be performed later in the action sequence (e.g., blowing the match out before using it);
- Step omission (SO) is an omission of a step of the multiple-actions sequence (e.g., inserting the filter in the coffee machine without pouring some water);
- Perseveration (P) is a repetition of an action step previously performed in the action sequence.

Class II: Conceptual errors

- Misuse (Mis) errors, which can be differentiated into two subtypes:
1. (Mis1) involves a well-performed action that is appropriate to an object different from the object target (e.g., hammering with a saw);
2. (Mis2) involves an action that is appropriate at a superordinate level to the object at hand but is inappropriately specified at the subordinate level (e.g., cutting an orange with a knife as if it were butter).
- Mislocation (Misl) errors, which can be differentiated into two subtypes:
1. (Misl1) is an action that is appropriate to the object in hand but is performed in completely the wrong place (e.g., pouring some liquid from the bottle onto the table rather than into the glass);
2. (Misl2) involves the correct general selection of the target object on which to operate with the source object or instrument in hand but with the exact location of the action being wrong (e.g., striking the match inside the matchbox).
- Tool omission (TO) is an omission in using an obligatory tool where the hand is used instead (e.g., opening a bottle without using a bottle opener);
- Pantomiming (Pant) is when the patient "pantomime shows" how the object should be used instead of using it;
- Perplexity (Perpl) is a delay or hesitation in starting an action or subcomponents of an action;
- Toying(T) consists of brief but repeated touching of an object or objects on the table.

As the examiner observes the patient for each task they mark off which errors were committed. From these criteria the examiner will be able to focus on severity of the dysfunction. It is important to express that the motor movement is not lost in patients with IA. Yet, at first glance their movements may appear to be awkward because they are unable to plan a sequence of movements with the given object.

== Therapy ==
Since the underlying cause of the disorder is damage to the brain, at present ideational apraxia is not reversible. However, Occupational or Physical Therapy may be able to slow the progression and help patients regain some functional control, with the treatment approach being the same as that of ideomotor apraxia. Some recovery may occur in younger patients after stroke, because brain plasticity may allow the functions of these damaged regions to be remapped. As patients develop new behaviors to cope with their apraxia, their brain's functioning neurons may take on some of the functions of the dead or damaged regions.

In the context of dementia, apraxia is a major cause of morbidity, and progresses with the underlying disease sometimes to the extent that patients may be unable to feed themselves or use simple utensils. Patients often become highly dependent or require nursing home placement because of their inability to properly use objects.

Brain imaging techniques such as fMRI, EEG, and PET scans may help in understanding the neuroanatomical and computational basis of ideational apraxia. Understanding these mechanisms is likely to be crucial in developing new modes of therapy to help patients cope with their disorder.
