= Ideomotor apraxia =

- Specialty: Neurology

Ideomotor Apraxia, often IMA, is a neurological disorder characterized by the inability to correctly imitate hand gestures and voluntarily mime tool use, e.g. pretend to brush one's hair. The ability to spontaneously use tools, such as brushing one's hair in the morning without being instructed to do so, may remain intact, but is often lost. The general concept of apraxia and the classification of ideomotor apraxia were developed in Germany in the late 19th and early 20th centuries by the work of Hugo Liepmann, Adolph Kussmaul, Arnold Pick, Paul Flechsig, Hermann Munk, Carl Nothnagel, Theodor Meynert, and linguist Heymann Steinthal, among others. Ideomotor apraxia was classified as "ideo-kinetic apraxia" by Liepmann due to the apparent dissociation of the idea of the action with its execution. The classifications of the various subtypes are not well defined at present, however, owing to issues of diagnosis and pathophysiology. Ideomotor apraxia is hypothesized to result from a disruption of the system that relates stored tool use and gesture information with the state of the body to produce the proper motor output. This system is thought to be related to the areas of the brain most often seen to be damaged when ideomotor apraxia is present: the left parietal lobe and the premotor cortex. Little can be done at present to reverse the motor deficit seen in ideomotor apraxia, although the extent of dysfunction it induces is not entirely clear.

== Signs and symptoms ==
Ideomotor apraxia (IMA) impinges on one's ability to carry out common, familiar actions on command, such as waving goodbye. Persons with IMA exhibit a loss of ability to carry out motor movements, and may show errors in how they hold and move the tool in attempting the correct function.

One of the defining symptoms of ideomotor apraxia is the inability to pantomime tool use. As an example, if a normal individual were handed a comb and instructed to pretend to brush his hair, he would grasp the comb properly and pass it through his hair. If this were repeated in a patient with ideomotor apraxia, the patient may move the comb in big circles around his head, hold it upside-down, or perhaps try and brush his teeth with it. The error may also be temporal in nature, such as brushing exceedingly slowly. The other characteristic symptom of ideomotor apraxia is the inability to imitate hand gestures, meaningless or meaningful, on request; a meaningless hand gesture is something like having someone make a ninety-degree angle with his thumb and placing it under his nose, with his hand in the plane of his face. This gesture has no meaning attached to it. In contrast, a meaningful gesture is something like saluting or waving goodbye. An important distinction here is that all of the above refer to actions that are consciously and voluntarily initiated. That is to say that a person is specifically asked to either imitate what someone else is doing or is given verbal instructions, such as "wave goodbye." People with ideomotor apraxia will know what they are supposed to do, e.g. they will know to wave goodbye and what their arm and hand should do to accomplish it, but will be unable to execute the motion correctly. This voluntary type of action is distinct from spontaneous actions. Ideomotor apraxia patients may still retain the ability to perform spontaneous motions; if someone they know leaves the room, for instance, they may be able to wave goodbye to that person, despite being unable to do so at request. The ability to perform this sort of spontaneous action is not always retained, however; some affected individuals lose this capability, as well. The recognition of meaningful gestures, e.g. understanding what waving goodbye means when it is seen, seems to be unaffected by ideomotor apraxia. It has also been shown that individuals with ideomotor apraxia may have some deficits in general spontaneous movements. Apraxia patients appear to be unable to tap their fingers as quickly as a control group, with a lower maximum tapping rate correlated with more severe apraxia. It has also been demonstrated that apraxic patients are slower to point at a target light when they do not have sight of their hand as compared with healthy patients under the same conditions. The two groups did not differ when they could see their hands. The speed and accuracy of grasping objects also appears unaffected by ideomotor apraxia. Patients with ideomotor apraxia appear to be much more reliant on visual input when conducting movements then nonapraxic individuals.

== Cause ==
The most common cause of ideomotor apraxia is a unilateral ischemic lesion to the brain, which is damage to one hemisphere of the brain due to a disruption of the blood supply, as in a stroke. There are a variety of brain areas where lesions have been correlated to ideomotor apraxia. Initially it was believed that damage to the subcortical white matter tracts, the axons that extend down from the cells bodies in the cerebral cortex, was the main area responsible for this form of apraxia. Lesions to the basal ganglia may also be responsible, although there is considerable debate as to whether damage to the basal ganglia alone would be sufficient to induce apraxia. Lesions to these lower brain structures has not, however, been shown to be more prevalent in apraxic patients. In fact, these types of lesions are more common in nonapraxic patients. The lesions most associated with ideomotor apraxia are to the left parietal and premotor areas. Patients with lesions to the supplementary motor area have also presented with ideomotor apraxia. Lesions to the corpus callosum can also induce apraxic-like symptoms, with varying effects on the two hands, although this has not been thoroughly studied. In addition to ischemic lesions to the brain, ideomotor apraxia has also been seen in neurodegenerative disorders such as Parkinson's disease, Alzheimer's disease, Huntington's disease, corticobasal degeneration, and progressive supranuclear palsy.

== Pathophysiology ==
The prevailing hypothesis for the pathophysiology of ideomotor apraxia is that the various brain lesions associated with the disorder somehow disrupt portions of the praxis system. The praxis system is the brain regions that are involved in taking processed sensory input, accessing of stored information about tools and gestures, and translating these into a motor output. Buxbaum et al. have proposed that the praxis system involves three distinct parts: stored gesture representations, stored tool knowledge, and a "dynamic body schema." The first two store information about the representation of gestures in the brain and the characteristic movements of tools. The body schema is a brain model of the body and its position in space. The praxis system relates the stored information about a movement type to how the dynamic, i.e. changing, body representation varies as the movement progresses. It is still not clear how this system maps out onto the brain itself, although some research has given indications to possible locations for certain portions. The dynamic body schema has been suggested to be localized in the superior posterior parietal cortex. There is also evidence that the inferior parietal lobule may be the locus for storage of the characteristic movements of a tool. This area showed inverse activation to the cerebellum in a study of tool use and tool mime. If the connections between these areas become severed, the praxis system would be disrupted, possibly resulting in the symptoms observed in ideomotor apraxia.

== Diagnosis ==
There is no one definitive test for ideomotor apraxia; there are several that are used clinically to make an ideomotor apraxia diagnosis. The criteria for a diagnosis are not entirely conserved among clinicians, for apraxia in general or distinguishing subtypes. Almost all the tests laid out here that enable a diagnosis of ideomotor apraxia share a common feature: assessment of the ability to imitate gestures. A test developed by Georg Goldenberg uses imitation assessment of 10 gestures. The tester demonstrates the gesture to the patient and rates him on how whether the gesture was correctly imitated. If the first attempt to imitate the gesture was unsuccessful, the gesture is presented a second time; a higher score is given for correct imitation on the first trial, then for the second, and the lowest score is for not correctly imitating the gesture. The gestures used here are all meaningless, such as placing the hand flat on the top of the head or flat outward with the fingers towards the ear. This test is specifically designed for ideomotor apraxia. The main variation from this is in the type and number of gestures used. One test uses twenty-four movements with three trials for each and a trial-based scoring system similar to the Goldenberg protocol. The gestures here are also copied by the patient from the tester and are divided into finger movements, e.g. making a scissor movement with the forefinger and middle finger, and hand and arm movements, e.g. doing a salute. This protocol combines meaningful and meaningless gestures. Another test uses five meaningful gestures, such as waving goodbye or scratching your head and five meaningless gestures. Additional differences in this test are a verbal command to initiate the movement and it distinguishes between accurate performance and inaccurate but recognizable performance. One test utilizes tools, including a hammer and a key, with both a verbal command to use the tools and the patient copying the tester's demonstrated use of the tools. These tests have been shown to be individually unreliable, with considerable variability between the diagnoses delivered by each. If a battery of tests is used, however, the reliability and validity may be improved. It is also highly advisable to include assessments of how the patient performs activities in daily life. One of the newer tests that has been developed may provide greater reliability without relying on a multitude of tests. It combines three types of tool use with imitation of gestures. The tool use section includes having the patient pantomime use with no tool present, with visual contact with the tool, and finally with tactile contact with the tool. This test screens for ideational and ideomotor apraxia, with the second portion aimed specifically at ideomotor apraxia. One study showed great potential for this test, but further studies are needed to reproduce these results before this can be said with confidence. This disorder often occurs with other degenerative neurological disorders such as Parkinson's disease and Alzheimer's disease. These comorbidities can make it difficult to pick out the specific features of ideomotor apraxia. The important point in distinguishing ideomotor apraxia is that basic motor control is intact; it is a high level dysfunction involving tool use and gesturing. Additionally, clinicians must be careful to exclude aphasia as a possible diagnosis, as, in the tests involving verbal command, an aphasic patient could fail to perform a task properly because they do not understand what the directions are.

== Management ==
Given the complexity of the medical problems facing people with ideomotor apraxia, as they are usually experiencing a multitude of other problems, it is difficult to ascertain the impact that it has on their ability to function independently. Deficits due to Parkinson's or Alzheimer's disease could very well be sufficient to mask or make irrelevant difficulties arising from the apraxia. Some studies have shown ideomotor apraxia to independently diminish the patient's ability to function on their own. The general consensus seems to be that ideomotor apraxia does have a negative impact on independence in that it can reduce an individual's ability to manipulate objects, as well as diminishing the capacity for mechanical problem solving, owing to the inability to access information about how familiar parts of the unfamiliar system function. A small subset of patients has been known to spontaneously recover from apraxia; this is rare, however. One possible hope is the phenomenon of hemispheric shift, where functions normally performed by one hemisphere can shift to the other in the event that the first is damaged. This seems to necessitate, however, that some portion of the function is associated with the other hemisphere to begin with. There is dispute over whether the right hemisphere of the cortex is involved at all in the praxis system, as some evidence from patients with severed corpus callosums indicates it may not be.

Although there is little that can be done to substantially reverse the effects of ideomotor apraxia, Occupational Therapy can be effective in helping patients regain some functional control. Sharing the same approach in treating ideational apraxia, this is achieved by breaking a daily task (e.g. combing hair) into separate components and teaching each distinct component individually. With ample repetition, proficiency in these movements can be acquired and should eventually be combined to create a single pattern of movement.
