= Rachelle Doody =

American neurologist

- Education: Rice University
- Scientific career
- Thesis: Aphasia: Some neurological, anthropological and postmodern implications of disturbed speech (1992)

Rachelle Smith Doody is an American neurologist and neuroscientist. She is known for her work on late stage development of drugs for Alzheimer’s disease, Parkinson’s disease, Huntington’s disease and other neurodegenerative disorders.

== Education and career ==
Doody holds a B.A. in English in 1978 and M.A./Ph.D. in Cognitive Anthropology in 1992 from Rice University. She did her medical training at Baylor College of Medicine in Houston, Texas, obtaining her M.D. in 1983. After medical school, Doody took a year of internship in internal medicine at McGill University in Montreal, Canada and then returned to Baylor College of Medicine in Houston she did a residency in Neurology, finishing in 1987. Upon finishing her residency, she began a Ph.D. which she would complete in 1992. At Baylor College of Medicine Doody founded and directed the Alzheimer’s Disease and Memory Disorders Center, was the Effie Marie Cain Chair in Alzheimer’s Disease Research and, as of 2022, she is Distinguished Professor Emeritus. In 2016 she moved to Genentech / Roche where she is the Vice President, Global Head of Neurodegeneration and the Alzheimer's disease and Neurodegeneration Franchise Head in Product Development, Neuroscience at Roche Pharmaceutical Company and its US entity, Genentech. In May of 2026, Doody was appointed to the Bored of Directors for ALBi Therapeutics.

Doody is primarily known for her work on the diagnosis and treatment of Alzheimer’s disease and related neurodegenerative disorders. For her Ph.D. she worked on cognitive anthropology, which included studying cognition among non-literate Karen hill tribes in Northern Thailand. Some of her early research was on alien hand syndrome where she worked to understand the condition in the brain with people exhibiting the condition. Doody led the phase 2 and 3 development of donepezil, a medication for dementia, and has worked to broaden the diagnosis and treatment of Alzheimer's disease. She also served on the executive committee for the Alzheimers Therapeutic Research Institute (ATRI).

== Selected publications ==
- Doody, R S; Jankovic, J (1992-09-01). "The alien hand and related signs". Journal of Neurology, Neurosurgery & Psychiatry. 55 (9): 806–810. doi:10.1136/jnnp.55.9.806. ISSN 0022-3050. PMC 1015106. PMID 1402972.
- Petersen, Ronald C.; Doody, Rachelle; Kurz, Alexander; Mohs, Richard C.; Morris, John C.; Rabins, Peter V.; Ritchie, Karen; Rossor, Martin; Thal, Leon; Winblad, Bengt (2001-12-01). "Current Concepts in Mild Cognitive Impairment". Archives of Neurology. 58 (12): 1985–1992. doi:10.1001/archneur.58.12.1985. ISSN 0003-9942. PMID 11735772.
- Doody, R. S.; Stevens, J.C.; Beck, C.; Dubinsky, R.M.; Kaye, J.A.; Gwyther, L.; Mohs, R.C.; Thal, L.J.; Whitehouse, P.J.; DeKosky, S.T.; Cummings, J.L. (2001-05-08). "Practice parameter: Management of dementia (an evidence-based review) [RETIRED]: Report of the Quality Standards Subcommittee of the American Academy of Neurology". Neurology. 56 (9): 1154–1166. doi:10.1212/WNL.56.9.1154. ISSN 0028-3878. PMID 11342679.
- Doody, Rachelle S; Gavrilova, Svetlana I; Sano, Mary; Thomas, Ronald G; Aisen, Paul S; Bachurin, Sergey O; Seely, Lynn; Hung, David (2008). "Effect of dimebon on cognition, activities of daily living, behaviour, and global function in patients with mild-to-moderate Alzheimer's disease: a randomised, double-blind, placebo-controlled study". The Lancet. 372 (9634): 207–215. doi:10.1016/S0140-6736(08)61074-0. PMID 18640457. S2CID 205951657.
- Doody, Rachelle S.; Thomas, Ronald G.; Farlow, Martin; Iwatsubo, Takeshi; Vellas, Bruno; Joffe, Steven; Kieburtz, Karl; Raman, Rema; Sun, Xiaoying; Aisen, Paul S.; Siemers, Eric; Liu-Seifert, Hong; Mohs, Richard (2014-01-23). "Phase 3 Trials of Solanezumab for Mild-to-Moderate Alzheimer's Disease". New England Journal of Medicine. 370 (4): 311–321. doi:10.1056/NEJMoa1312889. ISSN 0028-4793. PMID 24450890.

== Awards and honors ==
Doody received a Distinguished Alumni Award from Rice University in 2009 and a Distinguished Faculty Award from Baylor College of Medicine in 2011. In 2018 she received a Lifetime Achievement Award from the Clinical Trials in Alzheimer’s Disease Society.
