= Derek Denny-Brown =

New Zealand-born neurologist

Derek Ernest Denny-Brown OBE (1901 – 20 April 1981) was a New Zealand-born neurologist. Working in Oxford, London and Boston, he made major contributions to the field of neurology, such as the development of electromyography, physiology of micturition and the treatment of Wilson's disease.

== Biography ==
Born in New Zealand, he studied at the University of Otago at Dunedin, South Island, where he qualified in medicine in 1924. He then took up a fellowship to perform research at the department of Dr Sir Charles Scott Sherrington, where he studied motor neuron physiology. He obtained a DPhil and published sixteen scientific papers on his research.

In 1928 he took up a clinical post at the National Hospital for Neurology and Neurosurgery in London, and over the subsequent years underwent neurological specialist training, as well as serving as a lecturer, at the National Hospital and Guy's Hospital. The National Hospital was at the forefront of the developing specialty of neurology, and he was influenced by some of the senior staff such as Gordon Holmes, Charles Symonds and Samuel Alexander Kinnier Wilson. In 1933 he joined the Territorial Army (TA) section of the Royal Army Medical Corps (RAMC), being commissioned as a lieutenant on 9 December 1933, and promoted captain a year later. He was appointed as a neurologist at St Bartholomew's Hospital in 1935. He spent 1936 in Baltimore at Yale University performing research with former Oxford colleague John Fulton, then returned to London to work at the National Hospital. He married Sylvia Summerhayes in 1937; they were to have four sons. He transferred from the TA active list to the reserve of officers on 5 March 1938.

Denny-Brown was offered the professorship of neurology at Harvard Medical School in 1939, but the Second World War intervened, he was placed back on the active list on 9 October 1939 as the British mobilisation intensified. The next two years he worked in Oxford, and only after direct pressure on Winston Churchill by Harvard president James Conant was his mobilisation cancelled, and he was able to accept the offer at Harvard, where he started work in 1941, as well as assuming the directorship of neurology at Boston City Hospital. From 1945 to 1946 he was called again by the British army to direct the neurology services of the RAMC in India and Burma, with the local rank of brigadier, but he finally left the RAMC in 1950, and was granted the honorary rank of major.

He became a US citizen in 1952, and in Boston he did clinical work, teaching and training of residents, and physiological research. He was president of the American Neurological Association between 1959 and 1960, and brought it closer to the more recently established American Academy of Neurology.

After his retirement in 1967 he continued basic research, mainly on the peripheral nervous system, in Boston. From 1972 until his death from multiple myeloma in 1981 he was scholar in residence at the National Institutes of Health.

== Works ==
Research in 1938, with J.B. Pennybacker, laid the foundation for clinical electromyography (EMG).

In 1951 he introduced British anti-Lewisite as the first treatment for the copper overload disorder Wilson's disease. This discovery was one of the first effective treatments for a neurological condition.

Denny-Brown also made contributions to the understanding of many other neurological diseases.

== Influence ==
Denny-Brown came to the United States in a time when neurosurgery and psychiatry outshadowed the small field of neurology. He is credited with training a large number of neurology professors, and bringing the field of neurology into prominence.

== Selected publications ==
- Outline of neurological examination and case record. Cambridge, Mass.: Dept. of neurology, Harvard Medical School. 1942.
- Diseases of the basal ganglia and subthalamic nuclei. New York: Oxford University Press. 1946.
- Handbook of neurological examination and case recording. Harvard University Press; Oxford University Press. 1946.
- Cerebral control of movement. Liverpool University Press. 1966.
- Selected writings of Sir Charles Sherrington : a testimonial presented by the neurologists forming the guarantors of the journal Brain / compiled and edited by D. Denny-Brown. Oxford: Oxford University Press. 1979.
