= Environmental dependency syndrome =

Psychological disorder

Environmental dependency syndrome, also called Zelig syndrome or Zelig-like syndrome from the name of the protagonist of Woody Allen's Zelig, is a syndrome where the affected individual relies on environmental cues in order to accomplish goals or tasks. It is a disorder in personal autonomy that is influenced by individual psychological traits and can be helped through the intervention of other people. For example, adults diagnosed with attention deficit hyperactivity disorder have relied on special coaches to provide cues at appropriate times, helping them to make decisions about how to prioritize and order tasks.
