= Iodobenzamide =

Names
- Preferred IUPAC name N-{[(2S)-1-Ethylpyrrolidin-2-yl]methyl}-2-hydroxy-3-iodo-6-methoxybenzamide
- Other names IBZM; Iolopride

Identifiers
CAS Number	84226-06-2; 113716-48-6 (^{123}I); 113452-80-5 (^{125}I)
3D model (JSmol)	Interactive image
ChemSpider	97107
PubChem CID	107995
UNII	9J5D4ZN1JK; 5E76SOQ99K (^{123}I); 0709QG1NOY (^{125}I)
CompTox Dashboard (EPA)	DTXSID401144235
- InChI: InChI=1S/C15H21IN2O3/c1-3-18-8-4-5-10(18)9-17-15(20)13-12(21-2)7-6-11(16)14(13)19/h6-7,10,19H,3-5,8-9H2,1-2H3,(H,17,20)/t10-/m0/s1 Key: CANPFCFJURGKAX-JTQLQIEISA-N; InChI=1/C15H21IN2O3/c1-3-18-8-4-5-10(18)9-17-15(20)13-12(21-2)7-6-11(16)14(13)19/h6-7,10,19H,3-5,8-9H2,1-2H3,(H,17,20)/t10-/m0/s1 Key: CANPFCFJURGKAX-JTQLQIEIBE
- SMILES: Ic1ccc(OC)c(c1O)C(=O)NC[C@H]2N(CC)CCC2

Properties
Chemical formula	C_{15}H_{21}IN_{2}O_{3}
Molar mass	404.248 g·mol^{−1}

Pharmacology
ATC code	V09AB02 (WHO)
- Except where otherwise noted, data are given for materials in their standard state (at 25 °C [77 °F], 100 kPa). Infobox references

Iodobenzamide (IBZM or iolopride) is a pharmaceutical drug used for diagnostic purposes. It is a dopamine antagonist and it can be used by nuclear medicine physicians as a radioactive tracer for SPECT where the radioactive isotope is iodine-123 or iodine-125. The main purpose of a brain study with IBZM is the differentiation of Parkinson's disease from other neurodegenerative diseases such as Lewy Body dementia and multiple system atrophy.

== Study ==
Iodobenzamide can also be used to treat people that have schizophrenia. The Iodobenzamide binds to the Dopamine D2 receptors in the person’s brain and blocks excess neurons that cause an asymmetry in the brain, leaning heavily to the left side. People that receive doses of Iodobenzamide have their brain scanned to monitor their dopamine activity. A study found that patients that were drug-naive (did not have tolerance to the drug) had significant reactions in the left hemisphere of their brain to the drug. Patients with a first dose of Iodobenzamide were scanned and given benperidol (a drug used to treat hypersexuality) then scanned again. Male patients showed a left side heavy brain asymmetry of dopamine receptor binding in a drug-naive state. Benperidol leads to a reversal of the asymmetry. Drug-naive patient’s brains have a harder time binding the antipsychotic drugs to the part of their brain that receives the Dopamine D2 receptor.
