= Braak =

Braak may refer to:

== People ==
- Daniel ter Braak (born 1991), Dutch cricket player
- Eva Braak
- Heiko Braak (born 1937), German anatomist
- Ivo Braak (1906-1991), German author
- Jan Willem Ter Braak (1914–1941), Dutch spy
- Menno ter Braak (1902–1940), Dutch author and journalist
- Richard Braak (born 1938), German politician
- Ross ter Braak (born 1997), New Zealand cricket player

== Places ==
- Braak, Schleswig-Holstein, Germany

== Ships ==
- HMS Braak, later name of Dutch ship Minerva (1787)
- HMS Braak (1795), 18-gun brig-sloop of the Royal Navy

== Other ==
- Braak staging, used to classify the degree of Parkinson's disease and Alzheimer's disease
