= PAR1 =

PAR1 may refer to:

- PAR1 (gene), Prader–Willi/Angelman region-1 gene
- PAR-1, a serine/threonine-protein kinase of the KIN2/PAR-1/MARK kinase family
- Coagulation factor II receptor
- Parchive, a data archive format
- PAR1, one of the pseudoautosomal regions of the X or Y chromosome
