= Brain microbiome =

Hypothesized microbiome in the brain

The brain microbiome is a hypothesized microbiome of bacteria and other flora that may exist in the brain. Its existence is speculative.

Traditionally, the human brain is believed to be kept sterile due to the blood–brain barrier. Though pathogenic bacteria or viruses may enter the brain during encephalitis or other intracranial infections, healthy brains are believed to consist only of human cells. With the emergence of advanced sequencing technologies, some scientists have claimed to identify microbial RNA in ex vivo brain tissue, including some healthy brains. However, critics argue that contamination may be a more likely cause. Others argue that bacteria and infection in the brain may be due to end-stage deterioration of the blood brain barrier, as the body ages.

Some case studies have found neurodegeneration and dementia due to bacteria or other microbes. One group in the University of Edinburgh, studying Alzheimer's disease, called the Alzheimer's Pathobiome Initiative, has attempted to study if there are cases of dementia that are caused by and can be treated as microbial infections. The study, which compared healthy and diseased brains, remains unpublished, with peer reviewers asking for further confirmation and evidence. One study identified a microbiome existing in some fish brains, though its applicability to other species remains unknown. A group of scientists, responding to a Guardian article that promoted the concept, argued that the conception of a brain microbiome was inherently flawed. They argued that cases where bacteria were found in the brain were better described as infection, and further argued that previous scientific efforts to identify bacteria in healthy brains failed to grow any cultures.

In comparison to the known gut microbiome, a brain microbiome would likely have several orders of magnitude fewer microbes. Microbes would not necessarily need to reproduce to maintain a population within the brain, but would only need to leak through the blood-brain barrier at a low level. Alternatively, infection of the brain through nerves may also be a route for entry into the brain, such as through the olfactory bulb. If dementia is caused by an infection of the brain, brain-penetrant antibiotics and antifungals could provide relief for some patients. Some studies have attempted to quantify differences in microbe populations between diseased and healthy subjects.

== See also ==
- Gut–brain axis – Biochemical signaling between the gastrointestinal tract and the central nervous system
