= Tau protein =

Group of six protein isoforms produced from the MAPT gene

MAPT

Identifiers
- Aliases: MAPT, DDPAC, FTDP-17, MAPTL, MSTD, MTBT1, MTBT2, PPND, PPP1R103, TAU, microtubule associated protein tau, Tau proteins, tau-40
- External IDs: OMIM: 157140; MGI: 97180; GeneCards: MAPT
Available structures
PDB	Ortholog search: PDBe RCSB
PDB	List of PDB id codes 1I8H, 4GLR, 2ON9, 3OVL, 4E0M, 4E0N, 4E0O, 4FL5, 4NP8, 2MZ7, 4TQE, 4Y5I, 4Y32, 5DMG, 4Y3B, 5HF3, 5E2W, 5E2V

Gene location (Human)
Chr.	Chromosome 17 (human)
Band	17q21.31	Start	45,894,527 bp
Band	17q21.31	End	46,028,334 bp

Gene location (Mouse)
Chr.	Chromosome 11 (mouse)
Band	11 67.79 cM|11 E1	Start	104,231,390 bp
Band	11 67.79 cM|11 E1	End	104,332,090 bp
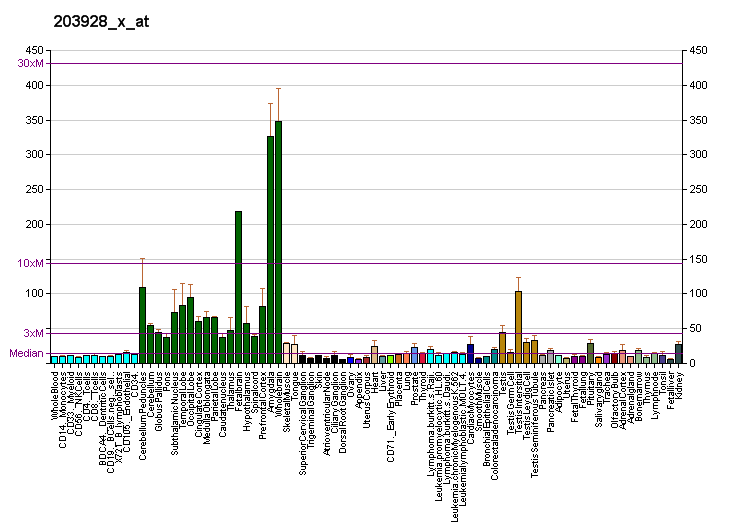

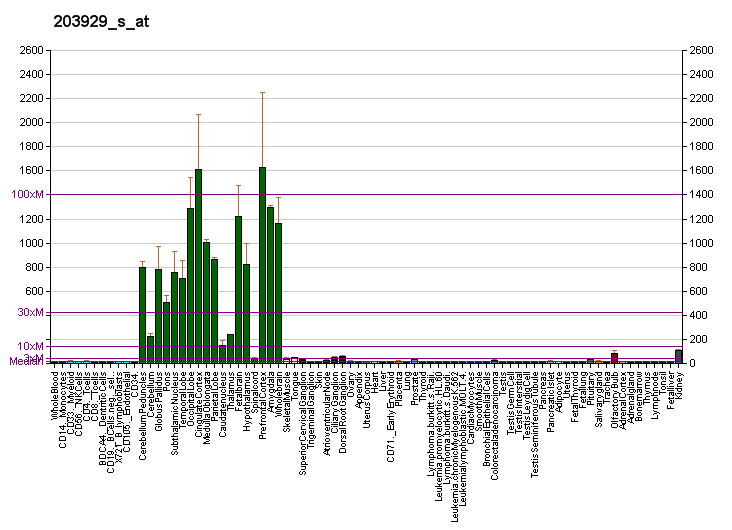

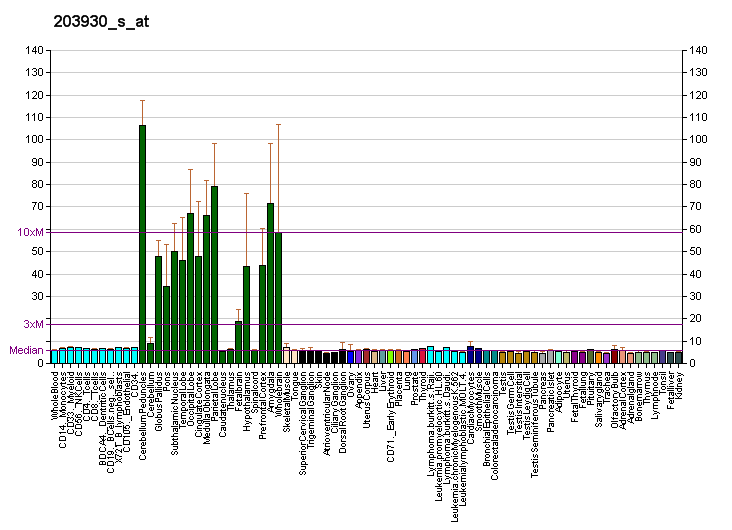
RNA expression pattern
Bgee	Human / Mouse (ortholog); Top expressed in: superior frontal gyrus; prefrontal cortex; right frontal lobe; right hemisphere of cerebellum; Brodmann area 9; primary visual cortex; anterior cingulate cortex; hypothalamus; hippocampus proper; temporal lobe / Top expressed in: ventromedial nucleus; lateral septal nucleus; central gray substance of midbrain; perirhinal cortex; mammillary body; CA3 field; lateral hypothalamus; temporal lobe; entorhinal cortex; nucleus of stria terminalis; More reference expression data
BioGPS	More reference expression data
Gene ontology
Molecular function	apolipoprotein binding; SH3 domain binding; tubulin binding; protein binding; lipoprotein particle binding; enzyme binding; DNA binding; actin binding; microtubule binding; dynactin binding; receptor ligand activity; protein phosphatase 2A binding; Hsp90 protein binding; minor groove of adenine-thymine-rich DNA binding; double-stranded DNA binding; single-stranded DNA binding; RNA binding; protein kinase binding; protein-macromolecule adaptor activity; phosphatidylinositol binding; identical protein binding; protein homodimerization activity; sequence-specific DNA binding; chaperone binding; histone-dependent DNA binding; microtubule lateral binding; phosphatidylinositol bisphosphate binding
Cellular component	cytoplasm; cell body; cell projection; nuclear periphery; growth cone; neurofibrillary tangle; plasma membrane; tubulin complex; dendrite; cytoplasmic ribonucleoprotein granule; cytoskeleton; nucleus; cytosol; microtubule; microtubule associated complex; membrane; nuclear speck; axon; somatodendritic compartment; soma; axon cytoplasm; extracellular region; intracellular anatomical structure; mitochondrion; microtubule cytoskeleton; axolemma; neuron projection; dendritic spine; main axon; membrane raft; glial cell projection
Biological process	generation of neurons; regulation of autophagy; regulation of microtubule polymerization; positive regulation of microtubule polymerization; positive regulation of axon extension; microtubule cytoskeleton organization; microglial cell activation; activation of cysteine-type endopeptidase activity involved in apoptotic process; signal transduction; memory; negative regulation of mitochondrial membrane potential; axonal transport of mitochondrion; cytoplasmic microtubule organization; neuron projection development; positive regulation of superoxide anion generation; negative regulation of kinase activity; cellular response to heat; astrocyte activation; intracellular distribution of mitochondria; synapse organization; regulation of calcium-mediated signaling; protein complex oligomerization; plus-end-directed organelle transport along microtubule; regulation of mitochondrial fission; negative regulation of mitochondrial fission; axonal transport; regulation of cellular response to heat; positive regulation of neuron death; positive regulation of protein localization to synapse; neurofibrillary tangle assembly; negative regulation of establishment of protein localization to mitochondrion; positive regulation of diacylglycerol kinase activity; regulation of response to DNA damage stimulus; internal protein amino acid acetylation; cell-cell signaling; response to lead ion; regulation of signaling receptor activity; negative regulation of gene expression; rRNA metabolic process; central nervous system neuron development; regulation of microtubule polymerization or depolymerization; regulation of chromosome organization; stress granule assembly; cellular response to reactive oxygen species; microtubule polymerization; regulation of synaptic plasticity; axon development; regulation of microtubule cytoskeleton organization; supramolecular fiber organization; regulation of long-term synaptic depression; positive regulation of protein localization; negative regulation of tubulin deacetylation; amyloid fibril formation; cellular response to nerve growth factor stimulus; cellular response to brain-derived neurotrophic factor stimulus
Sources:Amigo / QuickGO
Orthologs
Databases	NCBI: entry; OMA: entry
Species	Human	Mouse
Entrez	4137	17762
Ensembl	ENSG00000186868; ENSG00000276155; ENSG00000277956	ENSMUSG00000018411
UniProt	P10636	P10637
RefSeq (mRNA)	NM_001123066; NM_001123067; NM_001203251; NM_001203252; NM_005910 NM_016834; NM_016835; NM_016841; NM_001377265; NM_001377266; NM_001377267; NM_001377268	NM_001038609; NM_010838; NM_001285454; NM_001285455; NM_001285456
RefSeq (protein)	NP_001116538; NP_001116539; NP_001190180; NP_001190181; NP_005901 NP_058518; NP_058519; NP_058525; NP_001364194; NP_001364195; NP_001364196; NP_001364197	NP_001033698; NP_001272383; NP_001272384; NP_001272385; NP_034968 NP_001390904; NP_001390905; NP_001390906; NP_001390907; NP_001390908; NP_001390909; NP_001390910; NP_001390911; NP_001390912; NP_001390913; NP_001390916; NP_001390919; NP_001390921; NP_001390923; NP_001390925; NP_001390927; NP_001390928; NP_001390931; NP_001390933; NP_001390934; NP_001390935; NP_001390939; NP_001390940; NP_001390941; NP_001390943; NP_001390944; NP_001390945
Location (UCSC)	Chr 17: 45.89 – 46.03 Mb	Chr 11: 104.23 – 104.33 Mb
PubMed search
- Wikidata
View/Edit Human	View/Edit Mouse

The tau proteins (abbreviated from tubulin associated unit) form a group of six highly soluble protein isoforms produced by alternative splicing from the gene MAPT (microtubule-associated protein tau). They have roles primarily in maintaining the stability of microtubules in axons and are abundant in the neurons of the central nervous system (CNS), where the cerebral cortex has the highest abundance. They are less common elsewhere but are also expressed at very low levels in CNS astrocytes and oligodendrocytes.

Degeneration of the nervous system in forms of dementia such as Alzheimer's disease, frontotemporal dementia (FTD) disorders, and Parkinson's disease are associated with tau protein pathology, in which tau abnormally aggregates. The tau proteins were identified in 1975 as heat-stable proteins essential for microtubule assembly, and have since been characterized as intrinsically disordered proteins.

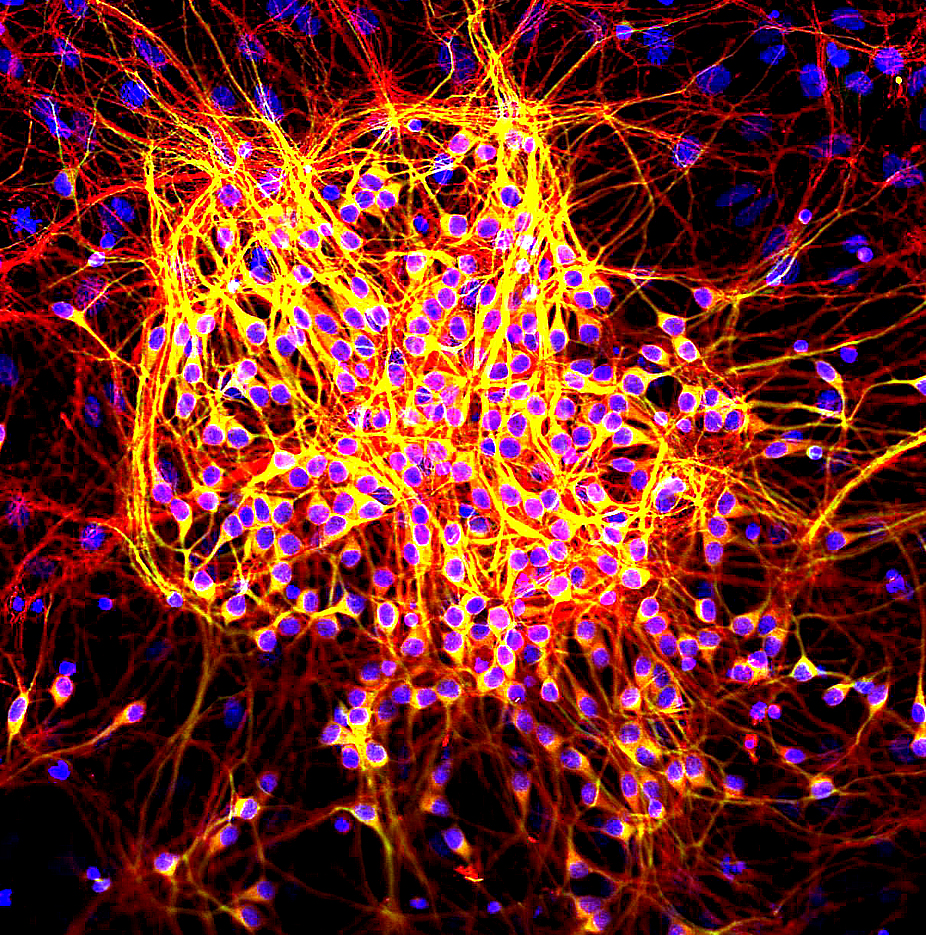
Neurons were grown in tissue culture and stained with antibody to MAP2 protein in green and MAP tau in red using the immunofluorescence technique. MAP2 is found only in dendrites and perikarya, while tau is found not only in the dendrites and perikarya but also in axons. As a result, axons appear red while the dendrites and perikarya appear yellow, due to superimposition of the red and green signals. DNA is shown in blue using the DAPI stain which highlights the nuclei. Image courtesy EnCor Biotechnology Inc.

== Gene ==
In humans, the MAPT gene for encoding tau protein is located on chromosome 17q21, containing 16 exons. The major tau protein in the human brain is encoded by 11 exons. Exons 2, 3 and 10 are alternatively spliced, which leads to the formation of six tau isoforms. In the human brain, tau proteins constitute a family of six isoforms with a range of 352–441 amino acids. Tau isoforms are different in having either zero, one, or two inserts of 29 amino acids at the N-terminal part (exons 2 and 3) and three or four repeat-regions at the C-terminal part (exon 10). Thus, the longest isoform in the CNS has four repeats (R1, R2, R3 and R4) and two inserts (441 amino acids total), while the shortest isoform has three repeats (R1, R3 and R4) and no insert (352 amino acids total).

The MAPT gene has two haplogroups, H1 and H2, in which the gene appears in inverted orientations. Haplogroup H2 is common only in Europe and in people with European ancestry. Haplogroup H1 appears to be associated with increased probability of certain dementias, such as Alzheimer's disease. The presence of both haplogroups in Europe means that recombination between inverted haplotypes can result in the lack of one of the functioning copies of the gene, resulting in congenital defects. The risk haplotype H1H1 in iPSC-derived cortical neurons revealed a higher expression of alpha-synuclein compared to H2H2, which may explain the association of haplotype with synucleinopathies such as Parkinson's disease.

== Structure ==
Six tau isoforms exist in human brain tissue, and they are distinguished by their number of binding domains. Three isoforms have three binding domains and the other three have four binding domains. The binding domains are located in the carboxy-terminus of the protein and are positively charged (allowing it to bind to the negatively charged microtubule). The isoforms with four binding domains are better at stabilizing microtubules than those with three binding domains. Tau is a phosphoprotein with 79 potential serine (Ser) and threonine (Thr) phosphorylation sites on the longest tau isoform. Phosphorylation has been reported on approximately 30 of these sites in normal tau proteins.

Phosphorylation of tau is regulated by a host of kinases, including PKN, a serine/threonine kinase. When PKN is activated, it phosphorylates tau, resulting in disruption of microtubule organization. Phosphorylation of tau is also developmentally regulated. For example, fetal tau is more highly phosphorylated in the embryonic CNS than adult tau. The degree of phosphorylation in all six isoforms decreases with age due to the activation of phosphatases. Like kinases, phosphatases too play a role in regulating the phosphorylation of tau. For example, PP2A and PP2B are both present in human brain tissue and have the ability to dephosphorylate Ser396. The binding of these phosphatases to tau affects tau's association with microtubules.

Phosphorylation of tau has also been suggested to be regulated by O-GlcNAc modification at various Ser and Thr residues. Elevation of O-GlcNAc has been explored as a therapeutic strategy to protect against tau hyperphosphorylation.

== Function ==
=== Microtubule stabilization ===
Tau proteins are found more often in neurons than in non-neuronal cells in humans. One of tau's main functions is to modulate the stability of axonal microtubules. Other nervous system microtubule-associated proteins (MAPs) may perform similar functions, as suggested by tau knockout mice that did not show abnormalities in brain development – possibly because of compensation in tau deficiency by other MAPs.

Although tau is present in dendrites at low levels, where it is involved in postsynaptic scaffolding, it is active primarily in the distal portions of axons, where it provides microtubule stabilization but also flexibility as needed. Tau proteins interact with tubulin to stabilize microtubules and promote tubulin assembly into microtubules. Tau has two ways of controlling microtubule stability: isoforms and phosphorylation.

In addition to its microtubule-stabilizing function, Tau has also been found to recruit signaling proteins and to regulate microtubule-mediated axonal transport.

=== mRNA translation ===
Tau is a negative regulator of mRNA translation in Drosophila, mouse, and human brains, through its binding to ribosomes, which results in impaired ribosomal function, reduction of protein synthesis and altered synaptic function. Tau interacts specifically with several ribosomal proteins, including the crucial regulator of translation rpS6.

=== Behavior ===
The primary non-cellular functions of tau is to negatively regulate long-term memory and to facilitate habituation (a form of non-associative learning), two higher and more integrated physiological functions. Since regulation of tau is critical for memory, this could explain the linkage between tauopathies and cognitive impairment.

In mice, while the reported tau knockout strains present without overt phenotype when young, when aged, they show some muscle weakness, hyperactivity, and impaired fear conditioning. However, neither spatial learning in mice, nor short-term memory (learning) in Drosophila seems to be affected by the absence of tau.

In addition, tau knockout mice have abnormal sleep-wake cycle, with increased wakefulness periods and decreased non-rapid eye movements (NREM) sleep time.

=== Other functions ===
Other typical functions of tau include cellular signalling, neuronal development, neuroprotection and apoptosis. Atypical, non-standard roles of tau are also under current investigation, such as its involvement in chromosome stability, its interaction with the cellular transcriptome, its interaction with other cytoskeletal or synaptic proteins, its involvement in myelination or in brain insulin signaling, its role in the exposure to chronic stress and in depression, etc.

== Mechanism ==
The accumulation of hyperphosphorylated tau in neurons is associated with neurofibrillary degeneration. The actual mechanism of how tau propagates from one cell to another is not well identified. Also, other mechanisms, including tau release and toxicity, are unclear. As tau aggregates, it replaces tubulin, which in turn enhances fibrilization of tau. Several propagation methods have been proposed that occur by synaptic contact such as synaptic cell adhesion proteins, neuronal activity and other synaptic and non-synaptic mechanisms. The mechanism of tau aggregation is still not completely elucidated, but several factors favor this process, including tau phosphorylation and zinc ions. Moreover, recent studies show that tau can coordinate up to three Zn²⁺ ions via distinct sites in the N-terminal, repeat, and C-terminal regions; occupancy of two Zn²⁺ sites is sufficient to promote liquid–liquid phase separation (LLPS) of tau in vitro, linking zinc homeostasis to condensate-driven aggregation pathways.

=== Release ===
Tau is involved in uptake and release processes, which are known as seeding. Uptake of tau protein requires the presence of heparan sulfate proteoglycans at the cell surface, which happens by macropinocytosis. On the other hand, tau release depends on neuronal activity. Many factors influence tau release such as, for example, the isoforms or MAPT mutations that change the extracellular level of tau. According to Asai and his colleagues, the spreading of tau protein occurs from the entorhinal cortex to the hippocampal region in the early stages of the disease. They also suggested that microglia were also involved in the transport process, and their actual role is still unknown.

=== Uptake ===
Tau protein has been found in the extracellular environment including Cerebrospinal fluid (CSF) and Interstitial fluid (ISF) under physiological and pathological conditions. Low-density lipoprotein receptor-related protein 1 (LRP1) has been shown as the receptor for Tau internalization into cells. However, studying Tau uptake in human neurons revealed that physiological Tau monomers mainly use LRP1 for internalization, while the uptake of pathological Tau aggregates depend on heparan sulfate proteoglycans.

=== Toxicity ===
Tau causes toxic effects through its accumulation inside cells. Many enzymes are involved in toxicity mechanism such as PAR-1 kinase. This enzyme stimulates phosphorylation of serine 262 and 356, which in turn leads to activate other kinases (GSK-3 and CDK5) that cause disease-associated phosphoepitopes. The degree of toxicity is affected by different factors, such as the degree of microtubule binding. Toxicity could also happen by neurofibrillary tangles (NFTs), which leads to cell death and cognitive decline.

== Clinical significance ==
Hyperphosphorylation of the tau protein (tau inclusions, pTau) can result in the self-assembly of tangles of paired helical filaments and straight filaments, which are involved in the pathogenesis of Alzheimer's disease, frontotemporal dementia and other tauopathies. All of the six tau isoforms are present in an often hyperphosphorylated state in paired helical filaments in the Alzheimer's disease brain. In other neurodegenerative diseases, the deposition of aggregates enriched in certain tau isoforms has been reported. When misfolded, this otherwise very soluble protein can form extremely insoluble aggregates that contribute to a number of neurodegenerative diseases. Tau protein has a direct effect on the breakdown of a living cell caused by tangles that form and block nerve synapses.

Gender-specific tau gene expression across different regions of the human brain has recently been implicated in gender differences in the manifestations and risk for tauopathies. Some aspects of how the disease functions also suggest that it has some similarities to prion proteins.

=== Tau hypothesis of alzheimer's disease ===
The tau hypothesis states that excessive or abnormal phosphorylation of tau results in the transformation of normal adult tau into paired-helical-filament (PHF) tau and neurofibrillary tangles (NFTs). The stage of the disease determines NFTs' phosphorylation. In AD, at least 19 amino acids are phosphorylated; pre-NFT phosphorylation occurs at serine 199, 202 and 409, while intra-NFT phosphorylation happens at serine 396 and threonine 231. Through its isoforms and phosphorylation, tau protein interacts with tubulin to stabilize microtubule assembly. All of the six tau isoforms are present in an often hyperphosphorylated state in paired helical filaments (PHFs) in the AD brain.

Tau mutations have many consequences, including microtubule dysfunction and alteration of the expression level of tau isoforms. Mutations that alter function and isoform expression of tau lead to hyperphosphorylation. The process of tau aggregation in the absence of mutations is not known but might result from increased phosphorylation, protease action or exposure to polyanions, such as glycosaminoglycans. Hyperphosphorylated tau disassembles microtubules and sequesters normal tau, MAPT 1 (microtubule associated protein tau 1), MAPT 2 and ubiquitin into tangles of PHFs. This insoluble structure damages cytoplasmic functions and interferes with axonal transport, which can lead to cell death.

Hyperphosphorylated forms of tau protein are the main component of PHFs of NFTs in the brain of AD patients. It has been well demonstrated that regions of tau six-residue segments, namely PHF6 (VQIVYK) and PHF6* (VQIINK), can form tau PHF aggregation in AD. Apart from the PHF6, some other residue sites like Ser285, Ser289, Ser293, Ser305 and Tyr310, located near the C-terminal of the PHF6 sequences, play key roles in the phosphorylation of tau. Hyperphosphorylated tau differs in its sensitivity and its kinase as well as alkaline phosphatase activity and is, along with beta-amyloid, a component of the pathologic lesion seen in Alzheimer disease. Soluble oligomeric tau species have been linked to more aggressive clinical progression in Alzheimer’s disease. In 2025, patient-derived high-molecular-weight tau was reported to impair complex spike bursting in hippocampal CA1 neurons and to be associated with reduced neuronal CaV2.3 expression in mouse and ex vivo models, providing a possible cellular mechanism for tau-related cognitive decline. A recent hypothesis identifies the decrease of reelin signaling as the primary change in Alzheimer's disease that leads to the hyperphosphorylation of tau via a decrease in GSK3β inhibition.

A68 is a name sometimes given (mostly in older publications) to the hyperphosphorylated form of tau protein found in the brains of individuals with Alzheimer's disease.

In 2020, researchers from two groups published studies indicating that an immunoassay blood test for the phospho-tau-217 (p-tau-217) form of the protein could diagnose Alzheimer's up to decades before dementia symptoms were evident.

=== Tau in Frontotemporal Lobar Degeneration (FTLD) ===
The tau protein is one of the most common aggregated proteins in frontotemporal lobar degeneration (FTLD), the pathology underlying FTD disorders, the other being TDP-43. While protein aggregation underlies FTLD tauopathies, the specific tau isoforms present and the morphology of the aggregates vary across subtypes.

FTLD tauopathies are predominantly associated with the 3R and 4R tau isoforms. The “Pick bodies” characteristic of the FTLD tauopathy known as “Pick’s disease” is associated with 3R tau. Progressive supranuclear palsy (PSP) and corticobasal syndrome/degeneration (CBS/CBD), meanwhile, are associated with the 4R isoform. There is evidence that a ratio of 3R and 4R tau is essential for preventing neurodegeneration, and that alterations in this ratio are believed to drive FTLD and related disorders without requiring co-occurrence with other pathologies.

FTD-tau appears to be sporadic in the majority of people diagnosed, but researchers do not yet fully understand the pathological mechanisms. Inherited pathogenic variants in the MAPT gene, however, are responsible for a fraction of people diagnosed with FTD-tau. Within and between families, FTD due to MAPT presents with significant heterogeneity in the symptoms that may be present, underscoring the possibility for genetic modifiers and environmental factors to influence clinical presentation. Intronic variants in MAPT, and most variants in exon 10, affect the 3R/4R tau ratio, contributing significantly to the development of FTLD pathology.

Hyperphosphorylation is believed to contribute to the development and progression of FTLD-tau, but evidence is inconclusive regarding the extent of its influence. There are significant differences in phosphorylation states across FTLD tauopathies, and the reasons for these differences are currently unknown. Pick bodies, for example, are not phosphorylated.

Tau aggregation in FTLD-tau occurs not only through accumulation and altered phosphorylation but also through a disrupted balance between 3R and 4R isoforms.

=== Traumatic brain injury ===
Repetitive mild traumatic brain injury (TBI) is a central component of contact sports, especially American football, and the concussive force of military blasts. It can lead to chronic traumatic encephalopathy (CTE), a condition characterized by fibrillar tangles of hyperphosphorylated tau. After severe traumatic brain injury, high levels of tau protein in extracellular fluid in the brain are linked to poor outcomes.

=== Ischaemic stroke ===
In ischaemic stroke, blood tau levels increase as a result of neuronal injury, leading to the release of tau into the bloodstream. One specific tau isoform measurable in blood, brain-derived tau (BD-tau), has been shown to be strongly associated with infarct size and clinical outcomes following ischaemic stroke.

=== Prion-like propagation hypothesis ===
The term "prion-like" is often used to describe several aspects of tau pathology in various tauopathies, like Alzheimer's disease and frontotemporal dementia. True prions are defined by their ability to induce misfolding of native proteins to perpetuate the pathology. True prions, like PRNP, are also infectious with the capability to cross species. Since tau has yet to be proven to be infectious it is not considered to be a true prion but instead a "prion-like" protein. Much like true prions, pathological tau aggregates have been shown to have the capacity to induce misfolding of native tau protein. Both misfolding competent and non-misfolding competent species of tau aggregates have been reported, indicating a highly specific mechanism.

== Interactions ==
Tau protein has been shown to interact with:

- Alpha-synuclein,
- FYN,
- Proto-oncogene tyrosine-protein kinase Src
- S100B, and
- YWHAZ.

== See also ==
- Tauopathy, a class of diseases associated with accumulated tau proteins
- Dementia pugilistica
- Alzheimer's disease
- Primary age-related tauopathy
- Corticobasal degeneration
- Progressive supranuclear palsy
- Proteopathy
- Pick's disease
- Frontotemporal dementia and parkinsonism linked to chromosome 17
- Prion
