= Eva Braak =

German anatomist

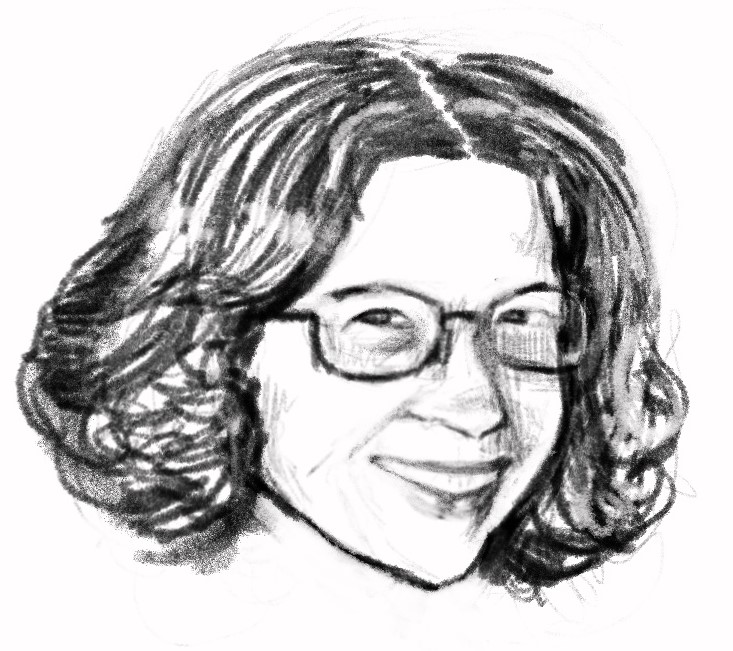
- Born: 26 November 1939; Schonwald, Germany
- Died: 25 July 2000
- Education: Georg August University, Vogt Institute for Brain Research – University of Dusseldorf, University of Kiel
- Occupations: Anatomist, professor

Eva Braak (1939–2000) was a German anatomist, mostly known for the Braak and Braak Alzheimer disease stages. She was professor at the Institute of Clinical Neuroanatomy, Johann Wolfgang Goethe-University, Frankfurt am Main.

== Education ==
Eva Foh was born on 26 November 1939 in Schönwald (Sudetenland). She received a PhD in biology in 1967 from the Georg August University of Göttingen, followed by postdoctoral training at the Institute of Brain Research in Neustadt where she studied with Cécile Vogt-Mugnier and Oskar Vogt (1967–1971). In 1971, she moved to the Christian Albrecht University of Kiel, Germany. There she met her future co-researcher and husband, Heiko Braak. They were married in 1973. In 1978 Eva completed her Habilitation in medicine, and became a lecturer in the Department of Anatomy. In 1979, or 1980 they moved to Frankfurt am Main to work with the Medical Faculty of Johann Wolfgang Goethe-Universität Frankfurt am Main. Eva was appointed to the rank of associate professor in the Department of Clinical Neuroanatomy.

== Career ==
Eva Braak and her husband, Heiko Braak, were in charge of a group investigating new techniques in the study of degenerative diseases of the brain In the 1970s, Braak and her husband implemented and perfected the then-new silver-iodate histological technique to study relatively thick sections of whole brains, up to 1000 microns. Using those methods, they contributed extensively to the neuropathology of Alzheimer's and Parkinson's diseases. In 1987, Braak and her husband were the first to describe the pathological changes of argyrophilic grain disease, an unknown tauopathy which was previously marked as senile dementia. A few years later, in 1991, they introduced a classification of Alzheimer's disease into six distinct pathoanatomical stages, now commonly known as Braak and Braak stages, based on the topographical distribution pattern of neurofibrillary changes from circumscribed parts of the limbic system to the higher neocortical association fields.

== Awards ==
Eva Braak was the first female scientist to receive an Award for Life-time Achievements in Alzheimer's Disease Research, granted during the Sixth International Conference on Alzheimer's Disease and related Disorders, in 1998 by the Alzheimer's Association International Conference.

== Death ==
Eva Braak died of ovarian cancer on 25 August 2000 in Frankfurt am Main.

== Selected publications ==
- Braak, H.; Braak, E. (1987). "Argyrophilic grains: characteristic pathology of cerebral cortex in cases of adult onset dementia without Alzheimer changes". Neuroscience Letters. 76 (1): 124–127. doi:10.1016/0304-3940(87)90204-7. ISSN 0304-3940. PMID 243859. S2CID 34334795.
- Braak, H; Braak, E (April 1991). "Demonstration of amyloid deposits and neurofibrillary changes in whole brain sections". Brain Pathology (Zurich, Switzerland). 1 (3): 213–6. doi:10.1111/j.1750-3639.1991.tb00661.x. PMID 1669710.
- Braak, H; Braak, E (1991). "Neuropathological stageing of Alzheimer-related changes". Acta Neuropathologica. 82 (4): 239–59. doi:10.1007/BF00308809. PMID 1759558.
- Braak, E.; Sandmann-Keil, D.; Rüb, U.; Gai WP, R.A.I (2001). "Alpha-synuclein immunopositive Parkinson's disease-related inclusion bodies in lower brain stem nuclei". Acta Neuropathologica. 101 (3): 195–201. doi:10.1007/s004010000247. ISSN 1432-0533. PMID 11307617. S2CID 6378983.
