= Dutch ship Minerva (1787) =

History

Dutch Republic & Batavian Republic
- Name: Minerva
- Builder: Veere, Zeeland Admiralty
- Launched: 1787
- Captured: 1799

Great Britain
- Name: Braak
- Acquired: 1799 by capture
- Fate: Sold 1802

United Kingdom
- Name: African
- Acquired: 1802 by purchase
- Fate: Last listed in 1810; broken up 1817

General characteristics
- Class & type: Dutch:7th Charter; Royal Navy:Post ship
- Type: Brig
- Tons burthen: 6136/94, or 615 (bm)
- Length: Overall:116 ft 6 1/2 in (35.5 m), or 136 voet, (Note: All linear measurements are in Amsterdam feet (voet) of 11 Amsterdam inches (duim) (see Dutch units of measurement). The Amsterdam foot is about 8% shorter than an English foot. All Dutch measurements are from van Maanan.) or 120 ft 10 in (36.8 m); Keel: 95 ft 8 1/8 in (29.2 m)
- Beam: 34 ft 8 1/2 in (10.6 m), or 36 voet 5/11 duim, or 35 ft 1 in (10.7 m)
- Depth of hold: 10 ft 6 in (3.2 m), or 13 voet 10/11 duim
- Propulsion: Sails
- Complement: Dutch service:150; British service:155; Whaler:32, or 40
- Armament: Dutch service:20–26 guns; Royal Navy service: Upper deck:22 × 32-pounder carronades; QD:2 × 6-pounder guns; Whaler:20 × 6&9-pounder guns (16 × 9-pounder + 4 × 6-pounder guns)
- Notes: Three decks and three masts

Minerva was launched in 1787 at Veere for the navy of the Dutch Republic. In 1799 the Royal Navy captured her. She became HMS Braak, but the Navy sold her with the arrival of the Peace of Amiens. Daniel Bennet purchased her and she became the whaler Africaine or African or Africa. She made two whaling voyages. After 1805 she was still listed in Lloyd's Register for some years but there is no record of further whaling or other voyages.

== Dutch navy ==
Admiral Mitchel's squadron captured Minerva on 28 August 1799 in the New Diep off Texel.

== Royal Navy ==
Minerva arrived at Sheerness on 3 May 1800. The Royal Navy took Minerva into service as HMS Braak, the former Braak having been lost in 1798. Braak underwent fitting between July 1800 and September 1801.

Captain John Mason Lewis commissioned Braak in August 1801. However, the Navy sold her in 1802.

The "Principal Officers and Commissioners of His Majesty's Navy" offered "Braak, 615 Tons, Copper-bottomed, lying at Deptford" for sale on 9 September 1802. She sold on that day or shortly thereafter.

== Whaler ==
The shipowner Daniel Bennett purchased Braak and renamed her Africaine (or Africa, or African). She first appeared in Lloyd's Register in 1803 as African with R. Jones, master, and Bennett, owner, and trade London–South Seas.

Captain Ransom Jones sailed from England on 4 February 1803, bound for the Isle of Desolation. He returned on 22 May 1804 with a reported 7000 barrels of oil.

Captain Ransom (or Ranson) Jones received a letter of marque on 18 July 1804. He sailed on 18 August 1804, again bound for the Isle of Desolation. She was reported to have been "all well" there on 25 February 1805.

On 3 August 1805 African left Saint Helena in a convoy under escort by HMS Calcutta. On 26 September the convoy was in the Channel south of the Isles of Scilly when it encountered Admiral Allemand's squadron. Calcutta ordered the convoy to make for England while she engaged the French. The French ultimately captured Calcutta, but by her sacrifice Calcutta had saved the convoy.

A French frigate chased African for some time but African escaped by "superior sailing". African reached Falmouth, and then returned to her moorings on 4 October 1805 with 70,000 seal skins, and oil.

== Fate ==
African was last listed in 1810 but with data unchanged from 1805. One source reports that she was broken up and her registration cancelled in 1817.
