= Heiko Braak =

German anatomist

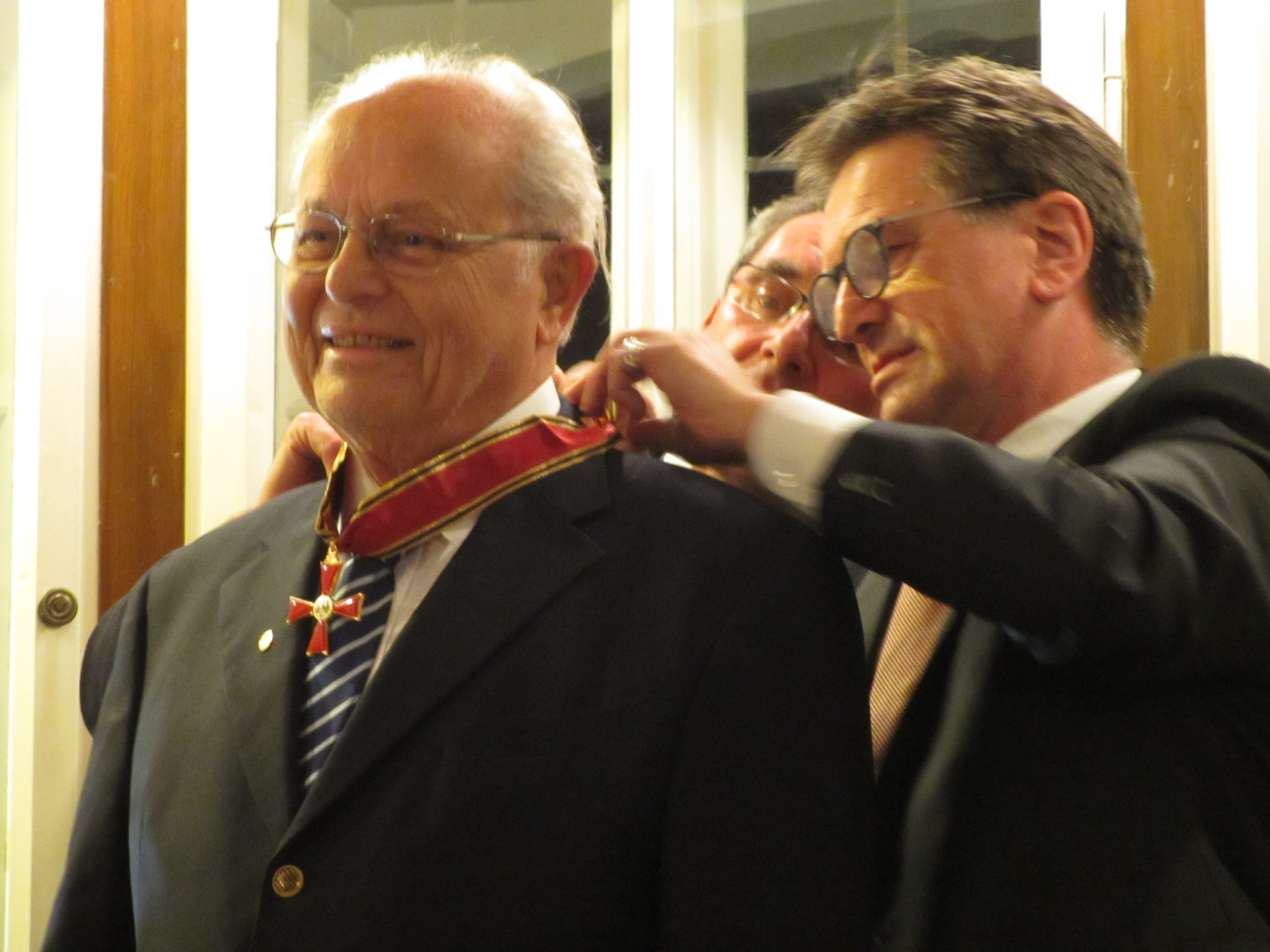
- Heiko Braak (left) in 2018
- Born: 16 June 1937 (age 88); Kiel, Germany
- Education: University of Hamburg, University of Berlin, University of Kiel
- Occupations: Anatomist, Professor

Heiko Braak (born 16 June 1937) is a German anatomist at the Clinical Neuroanatomy Section, Department of Neurology, Center for Biomedical Research, University of Ulm, Germany. He has received awards for his work on Alzheimer's disease and Parkinson’s disease. Braak and his colleagues described disease progression in terms of six different stages, each involving abnormal pathology in particular neurological structures. The type and severity of symptoms is correlated to progression through the Braak stages.

== Early life and education ==
Braak was born in Kiel, Schleswig-Holstein. Braak is the son of the philologist Professor Ivo Braak (1906–1991) and brother of theatre director Dr. Kai Braak.

Braak studied medicine at the universities of Hamburg, Berlin, and Kiel. He completed his doctorate in medicine from Kiel University in 1964, and his habilitation in anatomy in 1970.

Braak was married in 1973 to Eva Braak (d.2000) and later married Kelly Del Tredici.

== Career ==
In 1974, Braak was appointed Professor of Anatomy at Kiel. In 1978 Braak served as a Visiting Professor of Neurology at Harvard Medical School where he worked with Norman Geschwind. Braak published Architectonics of the Human Telencephalic Cortex in 1980.

From 1980–2002 Braak was professor and director of Institute of Clinical Neuroanatomy, Johann Wolfgang Goethe-University, Frankfurt am Main. From 2002–2009 he was a guest researcher at the Anatomical Institute. In 2009, he moved to Ulm University. Currently he is based at the Clinical Neuroanatomy Section, Department of Neurology, Center for Biomedical Research, University of Ulm, Germany.

== Research ==
Braak's early research focused on the morphology of the central nervous system of chondrichthyan fishes. In the holocephalan species Chimaera monstrosa (ratfish), he described, in the basal midline of the diencephalon, a previously unknown ependymall structure adjacent to the rostral part of the optic chiasma referred to as the ‘organon vasculare praeopticum’. It may be considered homologous to the supraoptic crest of mammals. Braak also described the morphology of the neurohypophysial complex of the squaliform elasmobranch Etmopterus spinax (Spinax niger).

Braak’s further research has focused on the morphology and pathoanatomy of the human central nervous system, in particular of the cerebral cortex (1980).

Braak has contributed extensively to the neuropathology of Alzheimer's disease and Parkinson's disease. In particular, he and his wife Eva Braak introduced a classification of Alzheimer's disease into six distinct pathoanatomical stages, now commonly referred to as Braak and Braak stages, based on the topographical distribution pattern of neurofibrillary changes from circumscribed parts of the limbic system to the higher neocortical association fields. A similar classification was proposed in 2003 for the pathoanatomical changes associated with idiopathic Parkinson's disease.

Braak and his wife, Eva Braak, were the first to describe the pathological changes of argyrophilic grain disease, a previously unknown form of senile dementia.

in 2007, Braak and co-authors advanced a ‘dual-hit hypothesis’ about the pathogenesis of idiopathic Parkinson's disease, according to which an unknown pathogen akin to a slow-virus may enter the nervous system through both the nasal and intestinal mucosae, eventually resulting in a cascade of neurodegenerative events in the brain.

== Selected publications ==
- Braak, H.; Braak, E. (1987). "Argyrophilic grains: characteristic pathology of cerebral cortex in cases of adult onset dementia without Alzheimer changes". Neuroscience Letters. 76 (1): 124–127. doi:10.1016/0304-3940(87)90204-7. ISSN 0304-3940. PMID 243859. S2CID 34334795.
- Braak, H; Braak, E (April 1991). "Demonstration of amyloid deposits and neurofibrillary changes in whole brain sections". Brain Pathology (Zurich, Switzerland). 1 (3): 213–6. doi:10.1111/j.1750-3639.1991.tb00661.x. PMID 1669710.
- Braak, H; Braak, E (1991). "Neuropathological stageing of Alzheimer-related changes". Acta Neuropathologica. 82 (4): 239–59. doi:10.1007/BF00308809. PMID 1759558.
- Braak, E.; Sandmann-Keil, D.; Rüb, U.; Gai WP, R.A.I (2001). "Alpha-synuclein immunopositive Parkinson's disease-related inclusion bodies in lower brain stem nuclei". Acta Neuropathologica. 101 (3): 195–201. doi:10.1007/s004010000247. ISSN 1432-0533. PMID 11307617. S2CID 6378983.
- Braak, H.; Del Tredici, K.; Rüb, U.; de Vos, R.A.I; et al. (2004). "Staging of brain pathology related to sporadic Parkinson's disease". Neurobiology of Aging. 24 (2): 197–211. doi:10.1016/S0197-4580(02)00065-9. ISSN 0197-4580. PMID 12498954. S2CID 22798538.
- Hawkes, C.H.; Del Tredici, K.; Braak, H. (2007). "Review: Parkinson's disease: a dual-hit hypothesis". Neuropathology and Applied Neurobiology. 33 (6): 599–614. doi:10.1111/j.1365-2990.2007.00874.x. PMC 7194308. PMID 17961138.
- Braak, H; Ludolph, AC; Neumann, M; Ravits, J; Del Tredici, K (January 2017). "Pathological TDP-43 changes in Betz cells differ from those in bulbar and spinal α-motoneurons in sporadic amyotrophic lateral sclerosis". Acta Neuropathologica. 133 (1): 79–90. doi:10.1007/s00401-016-1633-2. PMC 5209403. PMID 27757524.

== Awards ==
- 2014, Robert A. Pritzker Prize for Leadership in Parkinson’s Research, The Michael J. Fox Foundation
- 2017, Hartwig Piepenbrock-DZNE Prize, The Piepenbrock Group and the German Center for Neurodegenerative Diseases (DZNE)
- 2020, inaugural year, Parkinson Prize, Journal of Parkinson's Disease
