= Primary age-related tauopathy =

Primary age-related tauopathy (PART) is a neuropathological designation introduced in 2014 to describe the neurofibrillary tangles (NFT) that are commonly observed in the brains of normally aged and cognitively impaired individuals that can occur independently of the amyloid plaques of Alzheimer's disease (AD). The term and diagnostic criteria for PART were developed by a large group of neuropathologists, spearheaded by Drs. John F. Crary (then at Columbia University Medical Center) and Peter T. Nelson (University of Kentucky). Despite some controversy, the term PART has been widely adopted, with the consensus criteria cited over 1130 times as of April 2023 according to Google Scholar.

At autopsy, the hallmark of PART is the presence of Alzheimer-type neurofibrillary tangles (NFTs) composed of abnormal tau protein in neurons in the medial temporal lobe, but no amyloid-beta (Aβ_{42)} peptide accumulation in plaques. This ultimately leads to neuronal death and brain atrophy. 18% of Alzheimer neuropathological changes in cognitively normal and 5% of cognitively impaired elderly cases have been shown to display this pattern of degeneration. Patients with severe PART typically exhibit mild cognitive impairment or an amnestic dementia.

== Diagnostics ==
=== Neuropathological features ===
Patients with PART display neurofibrillary tangles that are essentially identical to those occurring in mild to moderate-stage Alzheimer's disease and other tauopathies. Amyloid pathology is sparse or absent in patients with PART. If few senile plaques are found, Thal phase grading can be implemented to differentiate the pathology as either PART or AD.

=== Clinical features ===
Patients with PART can be cognitively normal, mildly cognitively impaired, or demented. Specifically, higher stages of tangle burden (i.e. Braak III or IV) in PART have been found to be associated with more rapid decline on tasks involving episodic and semantic memory along with tests of processing speed and attention. Braak state 0 is restricted to the cortex, state l-ll bound by transentorhinal region and it can progress into limbic region of the brain (stage lll-lV). PART can be further categorized as symptomatic (cognitive impairment and dementia) and asymptomatic (no signs of dementia). One current hypothesis suggests that PART related dementia could be infrequent in younger populations, but may show symptomatic onset within oldest old (people greater than 90 years old). Given that the elderly represent a fast growing segment of the population worldwide, further research is needed to understand how PART related pathological process can manifest in specific clinical symptoms.

Furthermore, serological testing cannot be used to identify PART patients and MRI scans are the only current available diagnostic tools.

== Relationship to Alzheimer's disease ==
Given the similarities in the pattern of neurofibrillary tangles in PART, some scientists have argued that they represent the same phenomenon. However, others have argued that sufficient evidence exists to conclude that PART represents a pathological process. Further more, Aβ_{42} presence in AD contributes to tau hyper phosphorylation and consequently its development into NFTs. Aβ_{42} is absent in PART and due to several mechanisms underlying tau formation and maintenance, it would be necessary to separate PART from AD due to implications with respect to developing diagnostics and therapeutics.

== Genetics ==
PART has been associated with microtubule association tau protein (MAPT) H1 haplotype and no association has been seen with APOE ε4, a gene strongly linked to AD. Thus another piece of evidence supporting the hypothesis that PART represents a novel diagnostic category. Also transformation as a result of tau mutation into isoforms (3R and 4R) on chromosome 17 has been linked to Parkinson and frontotemporal dementia. Transformation in tau gene on chromosome 17 can be linked to PART due to the fact that the tau protein analyzed from PART NFTs consist of 3R and 4R isoforms. MAPT gene results in different tau protein isoforms due to splicing patterns of exon 10.

== Pathophysiology ==
MRI, immunoblot and immunofluorescence tools have allowed researchers to identify and observe tau protein aggregation both intra and intercellullary as well as their interaction with other proteins. Immunohistochemistry of brain autopsy of PART cases reveal that NFT's appear in the hippocampus area which is involved in memory formation. Also development of specific tau tracers allows for positron emission tomography (PET) imaging allowing for both intracellular and extracellular observation of tau protein behaviours.

Owing to these imaging and staining advancements, tau has been identified to be associated with microtubules in neuron cells. Tau protein stabilize the microtubules and are involved in fast dendrite growth, retrograde and antegrade transport intracellularly and neuron maintenance.

Tau protein is divided into three segments, i.e. N-terminal (regulated spacing of microtubules), C-terminal (microtubule polymerization), proline rich domain (kinase) and microtubule binding domain. Tau in brain of patients with tauopathies is hyperphosphorylated which causes the tau protein to dissociate from the microtubule then aggregate in to β-plated sheet arrangement. PART cases is due to tau protein isoforms (3 and 4 microtubule binding repeats) abnormal ration inneural cells resulting in their self assembling and accumulation resulting in NFT formation in brain. Detachment of tau from microtubules causes the neuron to lose its ability to sustain itself and thus ultimately it loses function.

Hyper-phosphorylation of tau protein was initially thought to be caused by Aβ_{42} but since PART cases generally lack senile plaques, other causes were investigated. One such cause was found to me the microtubule affinity-regulating kinase (MARK) since it is involved in tau phosphorylation and dephosphorylation. Overexpression of MARK gene results in excessive tau phosphorylation and eventually NFT's formation. It is suspected that at a threonine (Thr^{175} ), kinases such as GSK3β and MARK hyper-phosphorylate the mutant tau protein residue. Also researcher have linked to NFT survive (mutant tau protein maintenance) to heat shock protein 90 (HSP90) since HSP90 performs such function in cancer cells and its inhibition resulted in elimination of tau aggregates in vivo.

Recent finding's on tau regulation has revealed small non coding RNAs bind to recognition motifs on mRNAs and silence their expression through post-translational regulation. MiRNA-219 binds to tau mRNA and represses tau protein synthesis since in fly model brain, over expression of miRNA-219 reduced the tau protein accumulation.

== Treatment ==
These options listed below have not been yet linked or specified for PART treatment since the disease is yet to gain acceptance as a unique abnormality case by the medical community. Thus the treatments represent possible future options as per the research and finding in the medical literature.

=== HSP90 Targets ===
PU-DZ8 can pass the blood brain barrier and act on HSP90 to inhibit it.

=== Small molecule inhibitors ===
Staurosporine, Methylene blue and other kinase inhibitors can pass the blood brain barrier and inhibit MARK which consequently down regulation tau protein hyper-phosphorylation and ultimately its detachment from microtubules.
