= PP2B =

Serine/threonine-protein phosphatase 2B (PP2B) may refer to:

- PP2BA – PP2B catalytic subunit alpha isoform
- PP2BB – PP2B catalytic subunit beta isoform
- PP2BC – PP2B catalytic subunit gamma isoform
