= Meningioangiomatosis =

- Specialty: Neurology

Meningioangiomatosis is a rare disease and tauopathy of the brain. It is characterized by a benign lesion of the leptomeninges usually involving the cerebral cortex, and by leptomeningeal and meningovascular proliferation. Often the patient will present with seizures. The disease may be either sporadic or associated with neurofibromatosis type 2. The lesion is usually focused in one place, though extremely rare multifocal cases have been reported in both adults and children. Biopsy is usually necessary for diagnosis. Treatment conventionally involves surgical removal of the lesion.
