= KIN2/PAR-1/MARK kinase family =

Family of protein kinases

Kinase associated domain 1
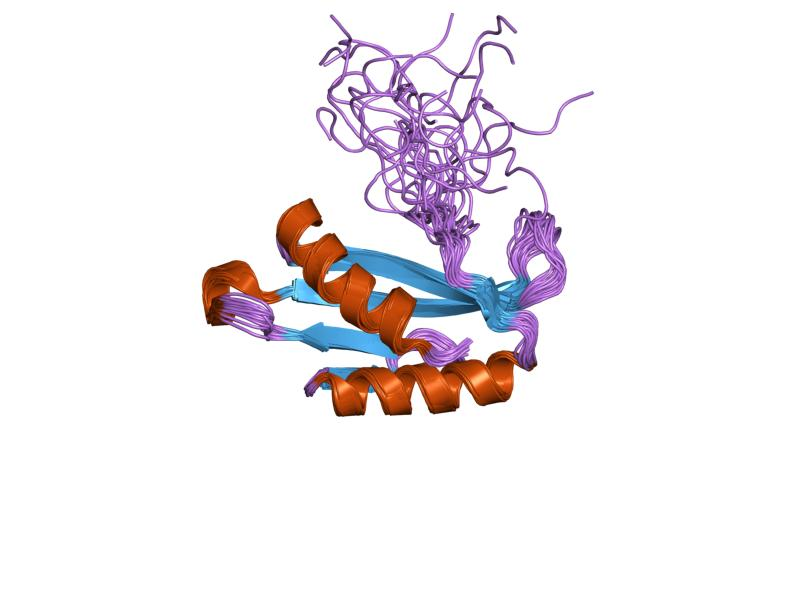
- solution structure of kinase associated domain 1 of mouse map/microtubule affinity-regulating kinase 3

Identifiers
- Symbol: KA1
- Pfam: PF02149
- InterPro: IPR001772
- SCOP2: 1ul7 / SCOPe / SUPFAM
Available protein structures:
- PDB: IPR001772 PF02149 (ECOD; PDBsum)
- AlphaFold: IPR001772; PF02149

In molecular biology, members of the KIN2/PAR-1/MARK kinase family of proteins are kinases that are conserved from yeast to human and share the same domain organisation: an N-terminal kinase domain and a C-terminal kinase associated domain 1 (KA1). Some members of this family also contain an UBA domain (ubiquitin-associated domain). Members of this kinase family are involved in various biological processes such as cell polarity, cell cycle control, intracellular signalling, microtubule stability and protein stability. The function of the KA1 domain is not yet known.

Some proteins known to contain a KA1 domain are listed below:

- Mammalian MAP/microtubule affinity-regulating kinases (MARK 1, 2, 3). They regulate polarity in neuronal cell models and appear to function redundantly in phosphorylating microtubule-associated proteins and in regulating microtubule stability.
- Mammalian maternal embryonic leucine zipper kinase (MELK). It phosphorylates ZNF622 and may contribute to its redirection to the nucleus. It may be involved in the inhibition of spliceosome assembly during mitosis.
- Caenorhabditis elegans and Drosophila PAR-1 protein, required for establishing polarity in embryos where it is asymmetrically distributed.
- Fungal Kin1 and Kin2 protein kinases involved in regulation of exocytosis. They localise to the cytoplasmic face of the plasma membrane.
- Plant KIN10 and KIN11 proteins, catalytic subunits of the putative trimeric SNF1-related protein kinase (SnRK) complex.
