= MARK1 =

Protein-coding gene in humans

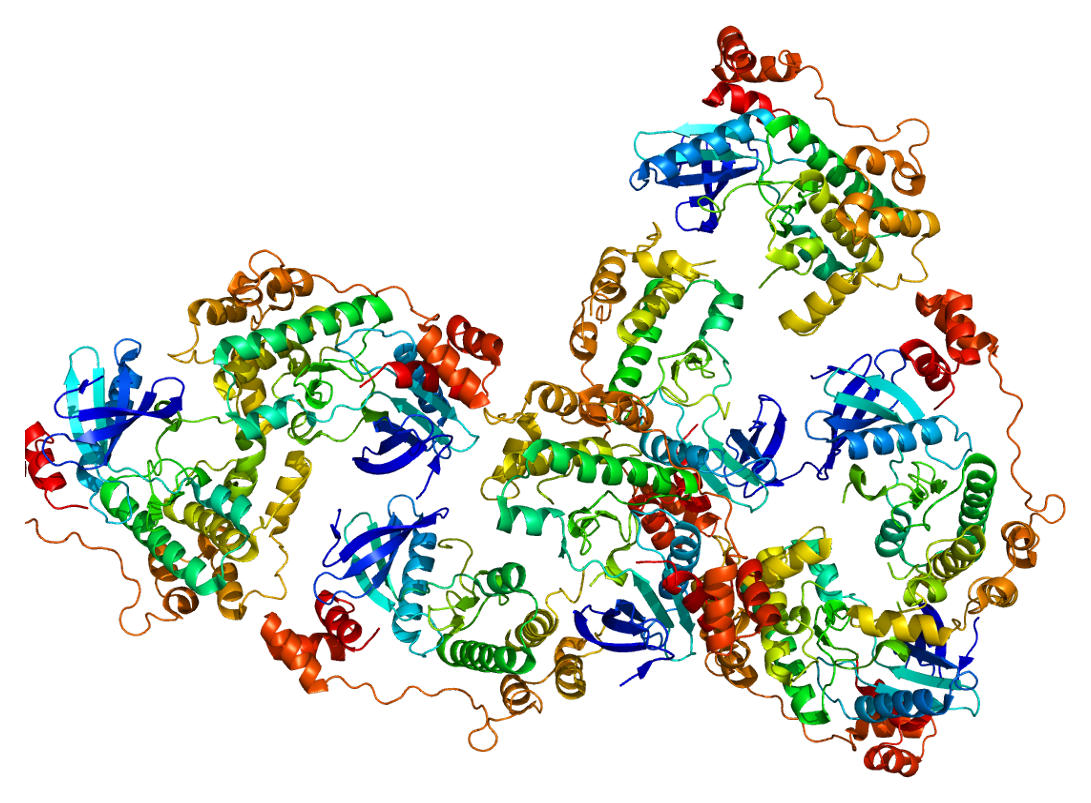

Identifiers
- Aliases: MARK1, MARK, Par-1c, Par1c, microtubule affinity regulating kinase 1
- External IDs: OMIM: 606511; MGI: 2664902; GeneCards: MARK1
Available structures
PDB	Ortholog search: PDBe RCSB
PDB	List of PDB id codes 2HAK, 3OSE
Enzyme activity
EC #	BRENDA	ExPASy	KEGG	MetaCyc
2.7.11.1	↗	↗	↗	↗
2.7.11.26	↗	↗	↗	↗

Gene location (Human)
Chr.	Chromosome 1 (human)
Band	1q41	Start	220,528,136 bp
Band	1q41	End	220,664,461 bp

Gene location (Mouse)
Chr.	Chromosome 1 (mouse)
Band	1|1 H5	Start	184,628,986 bp
Band	1|1 H5	End	184,731,767 bp
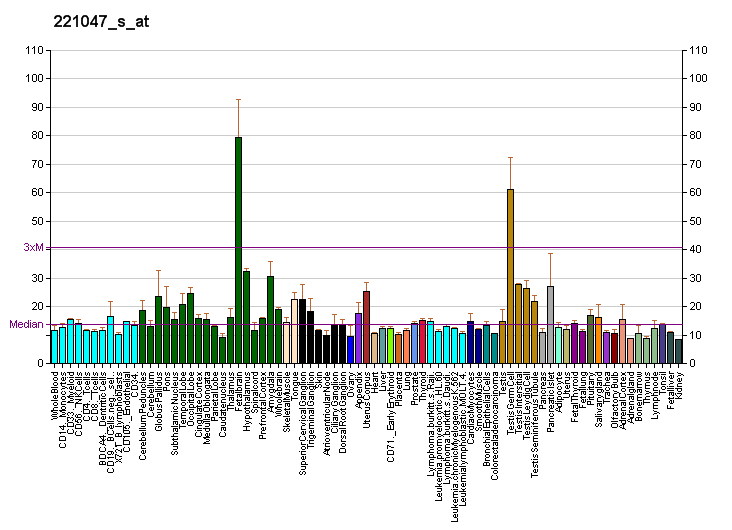
RNA expression pattern
Bgee	Human / Mouse (ortholog); Top expressed in: ganglionic eminence; ventricular zone; corpus epididymis; pons; cerebellar vermis; Brodmann area 23; superior frontal gyrus; spinal ganglia; endothelial cell; primary visual cortex / Top expressed in: trigeminal ganglion; motor neuron; barrel cortex; substantia nigra; fossa; external carotid artery; condyle; internal carotid artery; tunica media of zone of aorta; ascending aorta; More reference expression data
BioGPS	More reference expression data
Gene ontology
Molecular function	transferase activity; nucleotide binding; protein kinase activity; phosphatidylserine binding; metal ion binding; kinase activity; phosphatidic acid binding; protein serine/threonine kinase activity; tau-protein kinase activity; phosphatidylinositol-4,5-bisphosphate binding; ATP binding; magnesium ion binding; lipid binding; protein binding; tau protein binding
Cellular component	cytoplasm; membrane; microtubule cytoskeleton; plasma membrane; cytoskeleton; dendrite; cell projection
Biological process	intracellular signal transduction; phosphorylation; neuron migration; Wnt signaling pathway; protein phosphorylation; cytoskeleton organization; establishment of cell polarity; microtubule cytoskeleton organization; regulation of neuron projection development; peptidyl-serine phosphorylation; regulation of dendrite development; establishment of mitochondrion localization
Sources:Amigo / QuickGO
Orthologs
Databases	NCBI: entry; OMA: entry
Species	Human	Mouse
Entrez	4139	226778
Ensembl	ENSG00000116141	ENSMUSG00000026620
UniProt	Q9P0L2	Q8VHJ5
RefSeq (mRNA)	NM_001286124; NM_001286126; NM_001286128; NM_001286129; NM_018650	NM_145515; NM_001378876
RefSeq (protein)	NP_001273053; NP_001273055; NP_001273057; NP_001273058; NP_061120	NP_663490; NP_001365805
Location (UCSC)	Chr 1: 220.53 – 220.66 Mb	Chr 1: 184.63 – 184.73 Mb
PubMed search
- Wikidata
View/Edit Human	View/Edit Mouse

Serine/threonine-protein kinase MARK1 is an enzyme that in humans is encoded by the MARK1 gene.
