= HMS Braak (1795) =

Brig-sloop of the Royal Navy

Coordinates: 38.7760°N 75.0639°W

History

Dutch Republic
- Name: De Braak
- Namesake: The beagle
- Builder: P. v. Zwinjndregt, Rotterdam
- Launched: 1781
- Captured: By the British in February 1795

Great Britain
- Name: HMS Braak
- Acquired: February 1795
- Commissioned: 13 June 1797
- Fate: Capsized on 23 May 1798

General characteristics
- Class & type: 14-gun brig-sloop
- Tons burthen: 255 28/94 (bm)
- Length: 84 ft (26 m) (overall); 57 ft 4 3/4 in (17.494 m) (keel)
- Beam: 28 ft 11 in (8.81 m)
- Depth of hold: 11 ft 2 in (3.40 m)
- Sail plan: brig-sloop
- Complement: Dutch service: 80-100; British service: 86
- Armament: Dutch service: 18 guns; British service: 16 (later 14) × 24-pounder carronades + 2 × 6-pounder bow chasers

HMS Braak was an 18-gun brig-sloop of the Royal Navy. She was launched at Rotterdam in 1781 and initially served with the Dutch Republic. The British seized her, in Britain, after the Dutch entry into the French Revolutionary Wars, and took her into the Royal Navy. She served briefly with the British before capsizing off the North American coast. She was subsequently the focus of a number of salvage efforts.

== Dutch career ==
The cutter De Braak was launched as a "botter", or vessel of the 8th Charter. Sources also give her name as Baak, or Brak. She was part of a Mediterranean fleet based at the French port of Toulon.

By the 1790s Braak was in the Caribbean, and was present at the defence against the French of Willemstad, part of the Dutch colony at Curaçao, in 1793. By late 1794 she was ordered to escort a convoy of East Indiamen to Batavia in the Netherlands East Indies. En route she called at the English port of Falmouth, unaware that the French had since invaded the Netherlands and proclaimed the Batavian Republic as a client state, compelling the Dutch to declare war on the British. On the arrival of the convoy at Falmouth, the Royal Navy seized the 26 merchantmen and six warships of the convoy, including De Braak. A boarding party from the sloop-of-war HMS Fortune took over De Braak. Forty-six Royal Navy vessels that were at Plymouth shared in the prize money.

== British career ==
The Royal Navy took De Braak into service as HMS Braak and re-rigged her as a brig-sloop. She was initially commissioned under Commander James Drew on 13 June 1797. A storm at the end of the year dismasted her. On the completion of repairs, she returned to service in February 1798 and was assigned to escort a convoy to the Virginia Capes. She sailed for Halifax, Nova Scotia, on 17 March 1798. On 2 April, whilst off the Azores, she became separated from the rest of the ships. Towards the end of the month she fell in with and captured the Spanish ship Dom Francisco Xavier, which was carrying a cargo of copper, cocoa, and other goods and reportedly was worth some £160,000 in prize money.

Braak arrived in company with Dom Francisco Xavier in Delaware Bay on 25 May 1798, and took on a pilot, Andrew Allen, from Cape Henlopen in Delaware. In an exuberant mood because of the capture of the nearby Dom Francisco Xavier, Drew went below to fetch an alcoholic beverage with which he and Allen could toast his success. While he was below, Allen noticed dark clouds approaching and, concerned that a spring thunderstorm was about to strike, ordered Braak′s sails taken in. When Drew returned to the deck, he admonished Allen for ordering the sails to be taken in, telling him "You look out for the bottom, and I′ll look out for the spars." Drew ordered the crew to unfurl the sails, and shortly after they did a strong and sudden squall blew up as Allen had feared, filling the sails. Before the crew could take action, Braak listed heavily to one side, allowing water to pour into the ship's hold through open hatches. Within a few moments, Braak capsized, drowning Drew and 35 of his crew, as well as their 12 Spanish prisoners. Allen swam free of the sinking ship and was saved.

== Salvage and controversy ==
With the wreck lying on the bottom of Delaware Bay, rumours soon began to circulate concerning the amount of treasure Braak purportedly carried when she sank, with estimates of the value reaching $500 million. A number of artifacts were raised during the 1980s, but maritime archaeologists criticised these efforts for their disregard for proper archaeological methods, and for their discarding of anything not considered inherently valuable. In 1986, Braak′s hull was raised, but in such a way that considerable damage was done to both it and the surrounding area of archaeological interest. The hull was eventually placed in a museum, as were many of the artifacts recovered, including items such as decanters, bottles, and glasses. Only a small amount of coin was recovered, worth considerably less than the cost of the large number of salvage attempts that had been undertaken over the years. The treatment of the wreck of Braak, and of many others like it, was a contributing factor to the passage of the Abandoned Shipwrecks Act of 1987.
