= Tauopathy =

- Diagram of a normal microtubule and one affected by tauopathy
- Specialty: Neurology

Tauopathies are a large class of heterogeneous neurodegenerative diseases characterized by the neuronal and glial aggregation of abnormal tau protein. Hyperphosphorylation of tau proteins causes them to dissociate from microtubules and form insoluble aggregates called neurofibrillary tangles. Various neuropathologic phenotypes have been described based on the anatomical regions and cell types involved as well as the unique tau isoforms making up these deposits. The designation 'primary tauopathy' is assigned to disorders where the predominant feature is the deposition of tau protein. Alternatively, diseases exhibiting tau pathologies attributed to different and varied underlying causes are termed 'secondary tauopathies'. Some neuropathologic phenotypes involving tau protein are Alzheimer's disease, frontotemporal dementia, progressive supranuclear palsy, and corticobasal degeneration. Tauopathies can have different clinical and pathological presentations depending on the individual. This calls into question the previously held idea that individual tauopathies could be linked to specific diseases.

== Tau protein ==
Tau protein, also called tubulin associated unit or microtubule-associated protein tau (MAPT), is a microtubule-associated protein that promotes polymerization and stabilization into microtubules by binding to tubulin. Variants of Tau isoforms, spanning from 352 to 441 amino acids, arise through the alternative splicing of exons 2, 3 and 10 within the MAPT gene. The six isoforms are differentiated by the inclusion and exclusion of inserts of either 29 or 58 amino acids in the N-terminus domain. Furthermore, the isoforms are categorized based on the presence of either three (3R tau isoforms) or four (4R tau isoforms) tandem repeat sequences each consisting of 31 or 32 amino acids.

== Biomarkers ==
=== Neuroimaging ===
Positron emission tomography (PET) can be used to identify elevated levels of tau and other biomarkers in patients with Alzheimer's disease, providing spatial information of which regions have a high neuropathologic burden. However, disadvantages to PET imaging include cost, accessibility, and patient exposure to radioactivity, albeit minimal.

=== Biofluid ===
The analysis of cerebrospinal fluid (CSF) represents a potential avenue for the development of biomarkers in tauopathies. Substantial data on CSF biomarkers is available for Alzheimer's disease (AD), focusing on measures related to total and phosphorylated forms of tau and amyloid-beta (Aβ) protein. Elevated CSF tau and decreased Aβ levels constitute the characteristic CSF signature of AD, allowing differentiation from controls. This signature may also assist in distinguishing atypical forms of AD pathology associated with clinical frontotemporal dementia (FTD) from those with underlying frontotemporal lobar degeneration (FTLD)-Tau pathology.

== Pathologic phenotypes of tauopathies ==
=== Alzheimer's disease ===
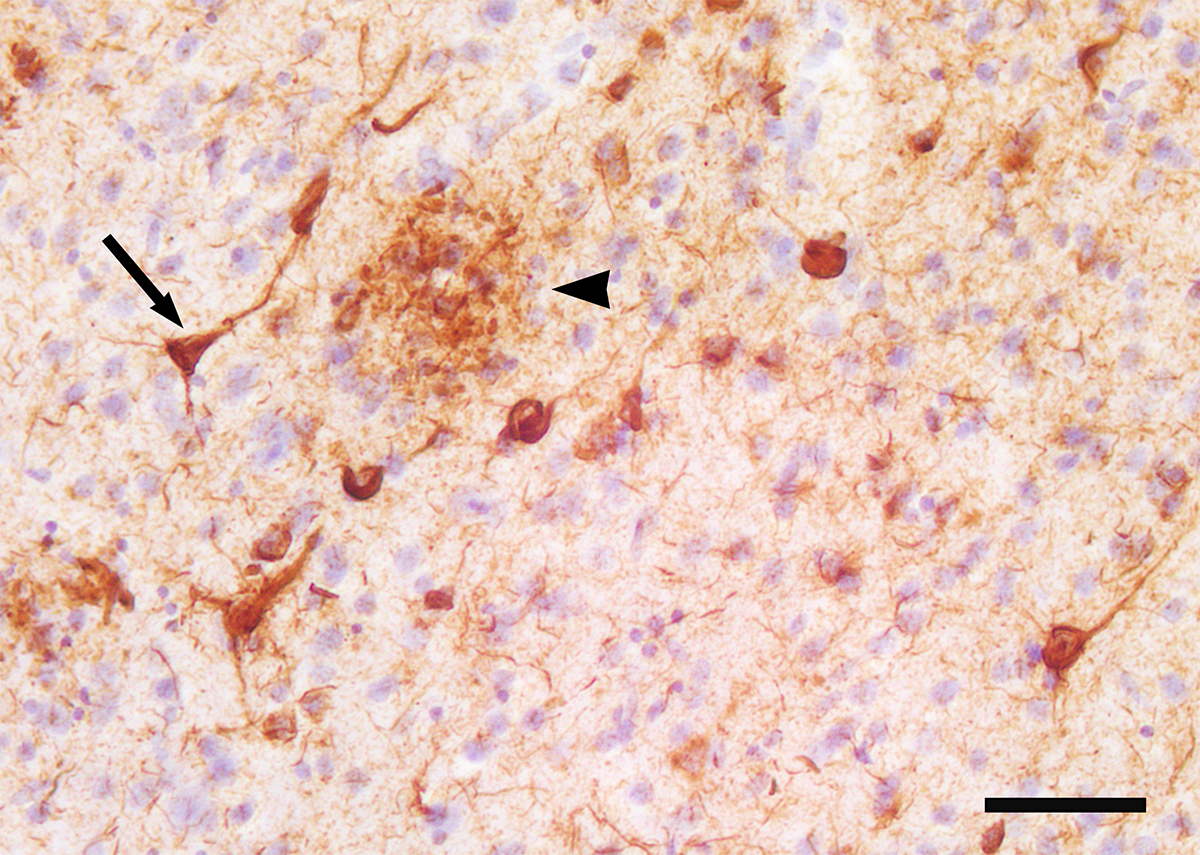
Micrograph of abnormal tau protein (brown) in the cerebral cortex of a person with Alzheimer's disease. The arrow indicates a neuron and the arrowhead indicates a neuritic plaque. Nissl counterstain; Bar = 50 microns.

Alzheimer's disease (AD) is a secondary tauopathy that is clinically characterized by a progressive decline in memory and cognitive functions, leading to severe dementia. Microscopically, AD is identified by the presence of two types of insoluble fibrous materials: (1) extracellular Aβ protein forming Aβ plaques and (2) intracellular neurofibrillary tangles composed of abnormally folded and hyperphosphorylated tau proteins. AD is not considered a primary tauopathy, as tau pathology coexists with Aβ protein deposition. The 'amyloid cascade hypothesis' posits that Aβ accumulation is the earliest factor driving AD pathogenesis, and tauopathy is an important downstream consequence of abnormal Aβ. AD neurofibrillary lesions were the first to undergo ultrastructural and biochemical analysis, thus laying the foundation for in-depth studies on tau protein deposition in other tauopathies.

=== Frontotemporal dementia ===
Frontotemporal dementia is one of a diverse spectrum of disorders clinically marked by degeneration of the frontal and temporal lobes, collectively referred to as frontotemporal lobar degeneration (FTLD). The frontotemporal dementias are clinically and pathologically heterogeneous. For FTD involving tauopathy, the primary histological characteristics include profound neuronal loss, enlarged neurons, and distinctive spherical argyrophilic inclusions known as Pick bodies (PBs). These PBs primarily consist of hyperphosphorylated tau protein, with tau protein presenting as two major bands at 60 and 64 kDa and a variable, minor band at 69 kDa. The filamentous tau deposits within neurons are predominantly composed of 3R tau isoforms.

=== Progressive supranuclear palsy ===
Progressive Supranuclear Palsy (PSP) is a rare (5-6.4 per 100,000 people) tauopathy that presents clinically with supranuclear gaze palsy (from which the name is derived) along with postural instability, various other motoric abnormalities and impairment of cognitive function. PSP has been divided into different subtypes that differ in terms of their rate of progression, prognosis, genetic predisposition, and geographic prevalence. The cause is not yet known. Both neurons and glial cells contain abnormal tau protein in PSP; a typical feature of the disease is tufted astrocytes. PSP is classified as a 4R tauopathy, meaning that the abnormal tau that aggregates within cells consists mainly of the 4-repeat form of the protein. Because of this, PSP is considered to be a relatively pure tauopathy, and it is often selected for trials of anti-tau therapeutics.

=== Corticobasal degeneration ===
Corticobasal degeneration (CBD) is characterized by both motor and cognitive dysfunction and degeneration of the cortex and basal ganglia. Biochemically, the distinctive tau profile in CBD cases manifests as a prominent tau doublet at 64 and 68 kDa, which is variably identified. These bands predominantly consist of hyperphosphorylated 4R tau isoforms, leading to the classification of CBD as a 4R tauopathy. CBD can be distinguished from PSP (another 4R tauopathy) by distinctive symptoms and neuropathology. In affected regions, histological examination reveals pronounced neuronal loss accompanied by spongiosis and gliosis, cortical ballooned cells, and intracytoplasmic filamentous tau pathology in both glial and neuronal cells.

=== Argyrophilic grain disease ===
Argyrophilic grain disease (AGD) is a late-onset tauopathy that occurs in 4-13% of neurogenerative dementia cases. It present post-mortem with moderate to severe cerebral atrophy, argyrophilic grains (within the entorhinal cortex, Brodmann area 27, and CA1 area of the hippocampus), and pre-tangle neurons. AGD, like CBD and PSP (other 4R tauopathies), includes prominent tau doublets at 64 and 68 kDa, but can be distinguished by the other 4R tauopathies due to only being diagnosed post-mortem. AGD findings also note manifestations of astrocytes containing phospho-tau with a granular immunoreactive cytoplasm, and Alpha-crystallin B positive neuron ballooning in the amygdala and middle layers of the basal temporal cortex.

== Other tauopathies ==
Dozens of diseases are known to involve abnormal aggregates of tau in the central nervous system. Below is a list of some other disorders in which tauopathy is present:

- Primary age-related tauopathy (PART) dementia has NFTs similar to those in AD, but without Aβ plaques.
- Chronic traumatic encephalopathy (CTE)
- Frontotemporal dementia and parkinsonism linked to chromosome 17 (FTDP-17) (a variant in the FTD spectrum).
- Vacuolar tauopathy (associated with a mutation in the gene that encodes valosin-containing protein (VCP))
- Lytico-bodig disease (Parkinson-dementia complex of Guam)
- Ganglioglioma and gangliocytoma
- Meningioangiomatosis
- Subacute sclerosing panencephalitis (SSPE)
- Other disorders associated with tauopathy include lead encephalopathy, tuberous sclerosis, pantothenate kinase-associated neurodegeneration, and lipofuscinosis

== Tau therapeutics ==
There are no specific treatments for tauopathies, although attempts have been made to target neurotransmitter disturbances to relieve disease symptoms. For AD, a specific treatment is difficult because both tau phosphorylation state changes and Aβ changes in the brain are thought to begin 20 years or more before symptoms become apparent. Even though there is no current disease-modifying treatment for tauopathies, there are treatments that can relieve symptoms. Speech therapy can be beneficial for aphasia symptoms, and symptoms such as depression and apathy can be treated with pharmaceuticals. For physical challenges, physical therapy has proven helpful in extending motor function for patients.

== See also ==
- Proteopathy
