= Braak staging =

Classification of disease severity

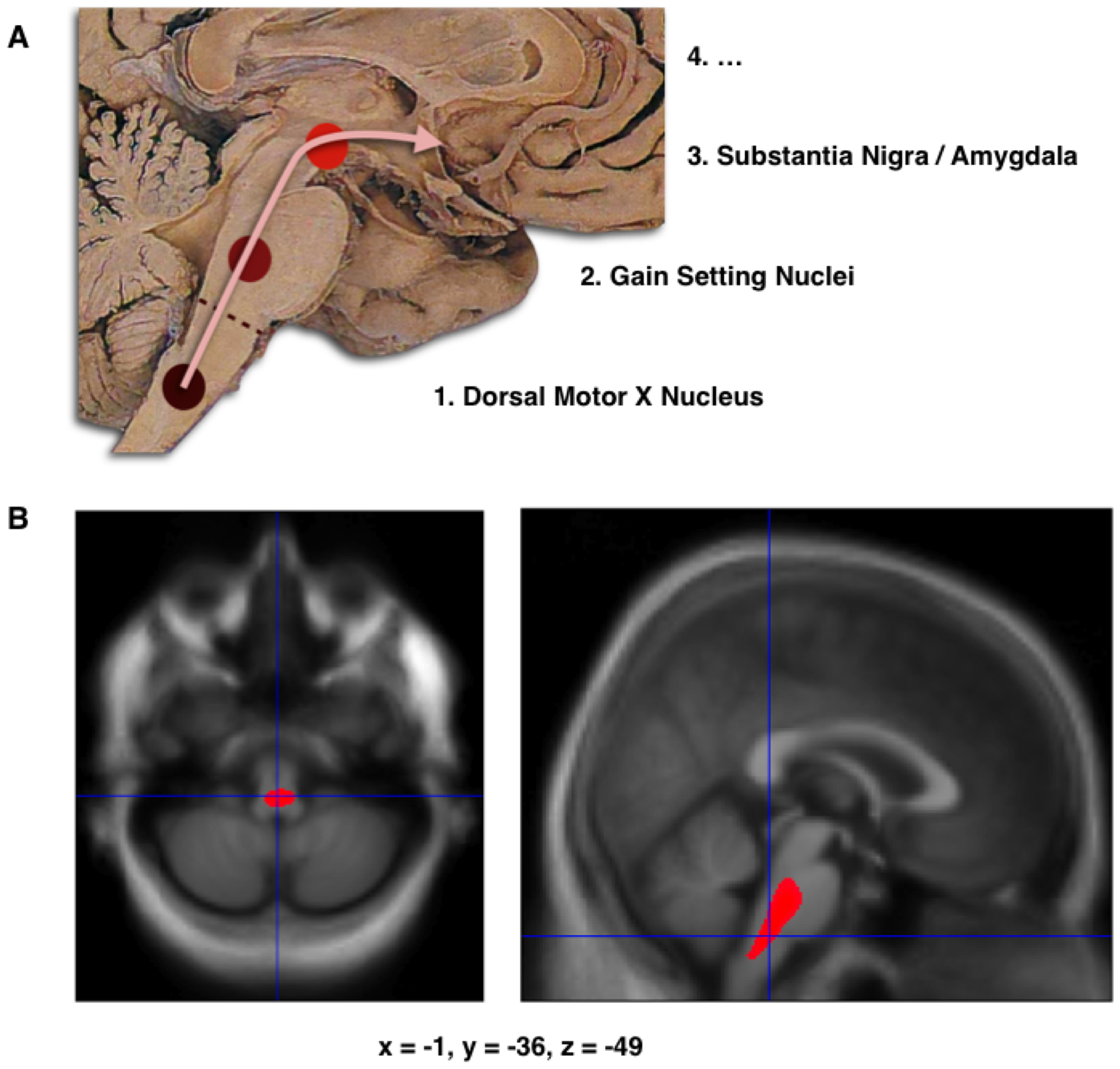
A. Schematic initial progression of Lewy body deposits in the first stages of Parkinson's Disease, as proposed by Braak and colleagues. B. Localization of the area of significant brain volume reduction in initial PD compared with a group of participants without the disease in a neuroimaging study which concluded that brain stem damage may be the first identifiable stage of PD neuropathology.

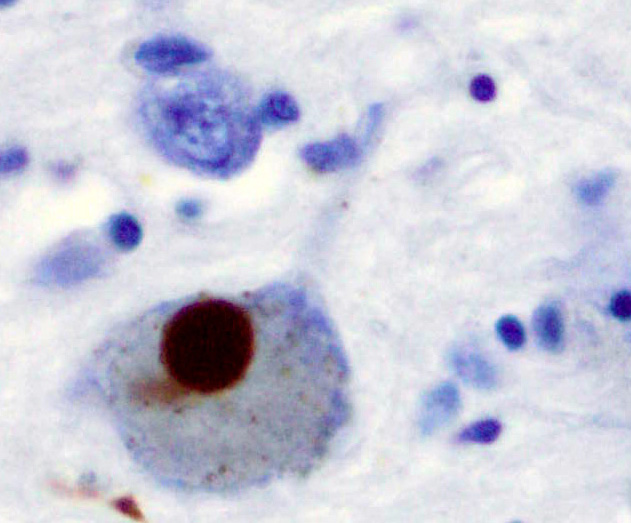
Positive Alpha-Synuclein staining of a Lewy body in a patient with Parkinson's disease.

Braak staging refers to two methods used to classify the degree of pathology in Parkinson's disease and Alzheimer's disease. These methods are used both in research and for the clinical diagnosis of these diseases and are obtained by performing an autopsy of the brain.

== Parkinson's disease ==
The main pathological characteristic of Parkinson's disease is cell death in the substantia nigra. In particular, this death occurs in the ventral part of the pars compacta, with up to 70% of the cells affected by the time the patient dies. The mechanisms by which the brain cells are lost are varied. One mechanism consists of an abnormal accumulation of the protein alpha-synuclein bound to ubiquitin in the damaged cells. This protein accumulation forms inclusions called Lewy bodies.

=== Braak's theory ===
The staging in Parkinson's disease was described by Heiko Braak in 2003. Braak and colleagues state that Parkinson's disease begins when a foreign agent enters the body via the nose or gastrointestinal system and travels into the central nervous system (CNS). The presence of Lewy bodies in the enteric and peripheral nervous systems supports their claim. This Lewy body pathology selectively travels through the CNS, targeting thin and largely unmyelinated neurons. Braak et al., therefore, developed a staging system that characterizes disease progression. This system is divided into six different stages, with each stage being attributed to abnormal pathology in particular neurological structures. In terms of symptomatology, the type and severity of symptoms is correlated to progression through the Braak stages. Early stages are characterized by non-motor symptoms, such as a lessened sense of smell or constipation. Motor symptoms are often displayed around the mid-stage state, and cognitive symptoms arise as later Braak stages are reached. Braak and colleagues further state that the disease begins in the enteric nervous system and gains entry to the CNS through the vagus nerve.

==== Stage 1 ====
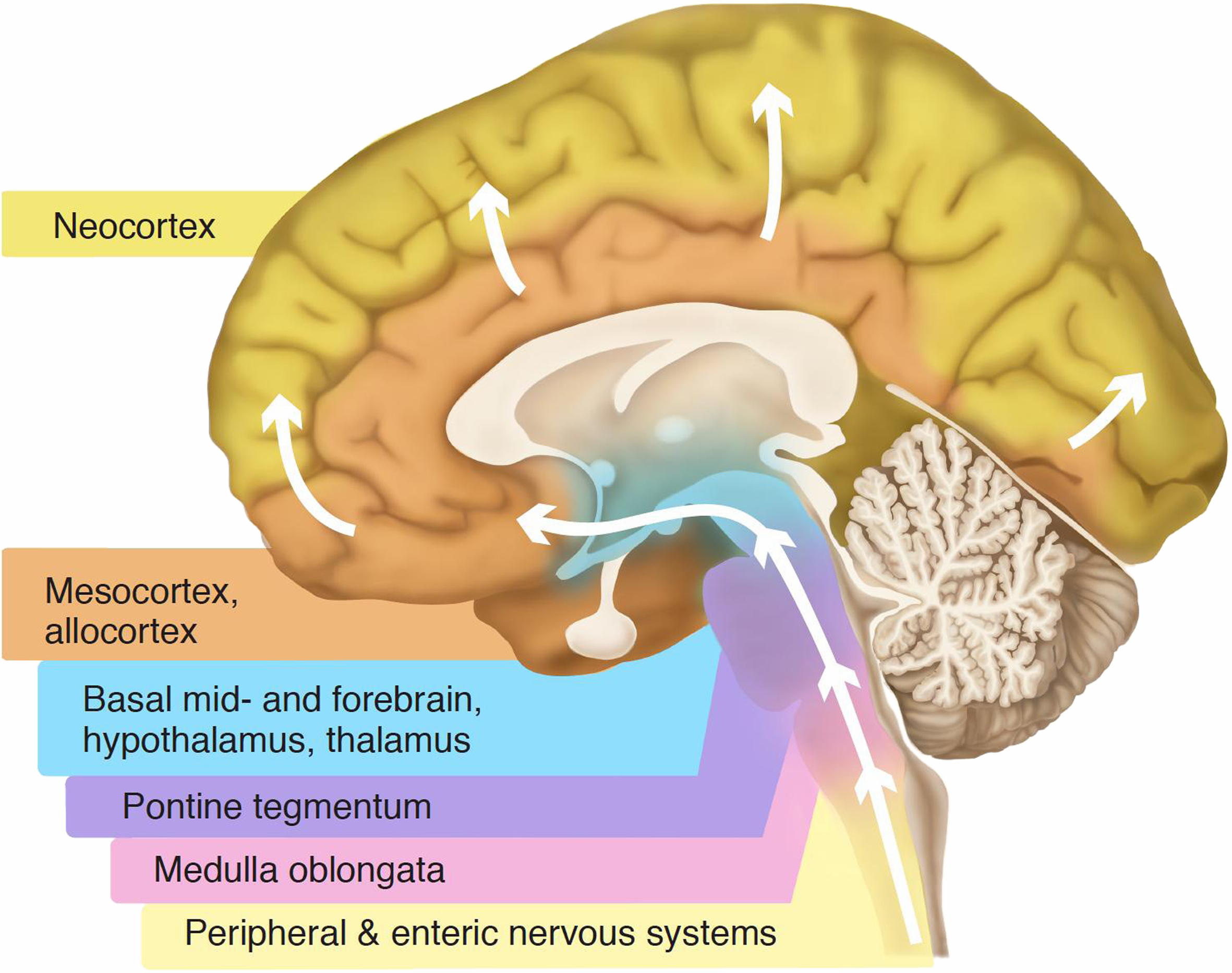
Braak Staging: Yellow represents the origin of Parkinson's pathology. Pink/purple represent Stages 1 and 2. Blue represents Stages 3 and 4. Orange represents Stage 5. Yellow represents full neocortex engagement and Stage 6.

The disease begins in structures of the lower brainstem and the olfactory system. In particular, the dorsal motor nucleus of the vagus nerve in the medulla oblongata and anterior olfactory nucleus are affected. Lewy neurites, thread-like alpha-synuclein aggregates, are more prevalent than globular Lewy bodies in this stage.

==== Stage 2 ====
In addition to the pathology observed in Stage 1, Stage 2 is characterized by additional lesions in the raphe nuclei and gigantocellular reticular nucleus of the medulla oblongata. The disease then moves up the brainstem, traveling from the medullary structures to the locus ceruleus in the pontine tegmentum. Similar to Stage 1, Lewy neurites outnumber Lewy bodies.

==== Stage 3 ====
At the beginning of Stage 3, the disease has entered the substantia nigra and Lewy body lesions begin to form in the pars compacta. The latter half of this stage involves disease progression into the basal nucleus of Meynert, a cluster of acetylcholine-rich neurons in the basal forebrain. Further, structures affected in Stages 1 and 2 begin to develop more Lewy bodies.

==== Stage 4 ====
Stage 4 is characterized by severe dopaminergic cell destruction in the pars compacta. There is also mesocortex and allocortex involvement; the neocortex remains unaffected. In particular, pathology can be observed in the amygdala and in the subnuclei of the thalamus. There is significant damage done to the anterior olfactory nucleus.

==== Stage 5 ====
The disease has started to invade the neocortex and spreads into the structures of the temporal, parietal, and frontal lobes. Cell death can be observed in the substantia nigra, the dorsal motor nucleus of the vagus nerve, the gigantocellular reticular nucleus, and the locus ceruleus.

==== Stage 6 ====
The disease has fully invaded the neocortex, affecting the motor and sensory areas in the brain. The disease is at its most severe.

== Alzheimer's disease ==
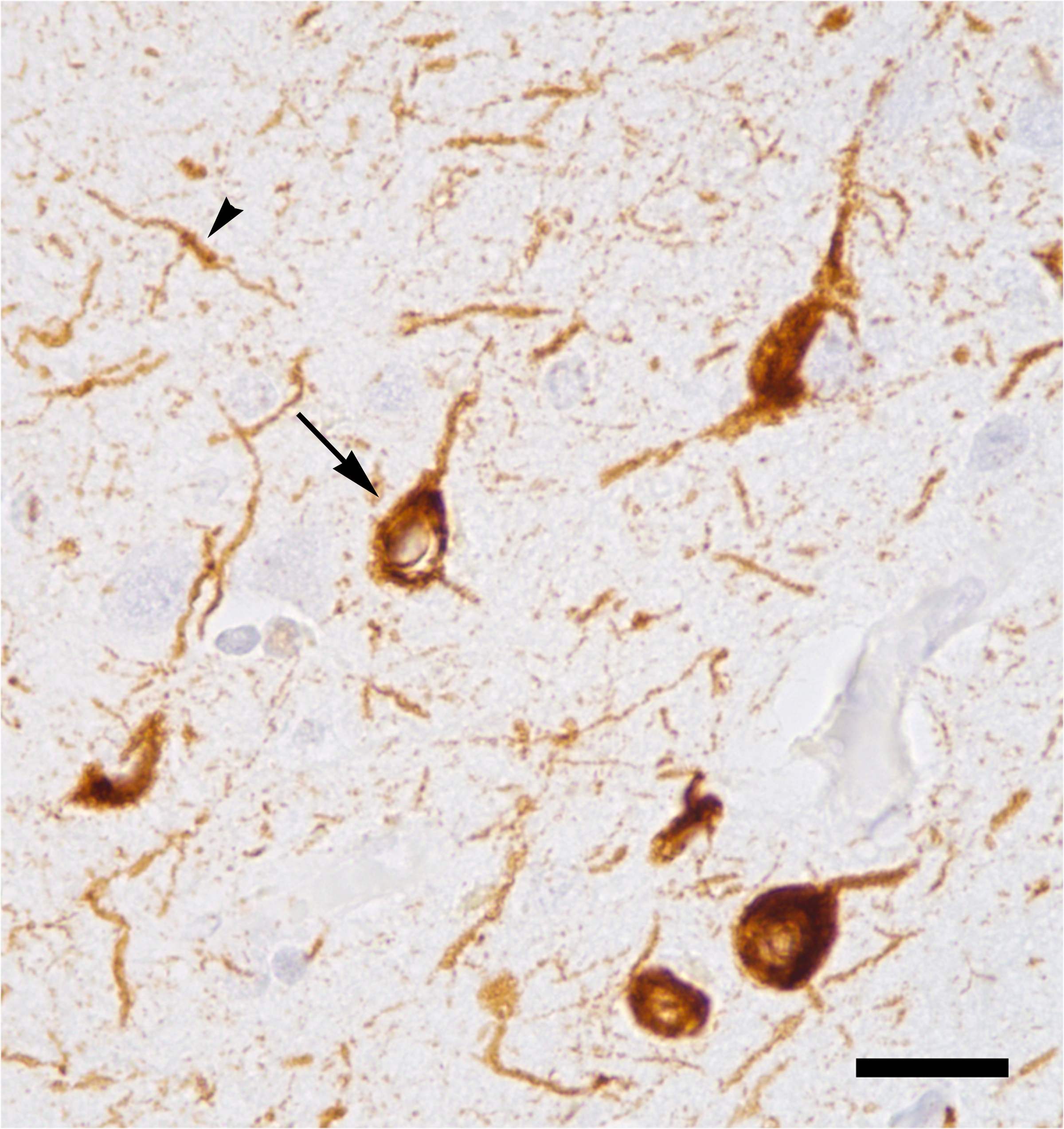
Abnormal accumulation of tau protein, which constitutes neurofibrillary tangles, in neuronal cell bodies (arrow) and neuronal extensions (arrowhead) in the neocortex of a patient who had died with Alzheimer's disease at Braak stage VI. The bar = 25 microns (0.025 millimeters).

Staging in Alzheimer's disease was described by Braak in 1991. Braak stages I and II are used when neurofibrillary tangle involvement is confined mainly to the transentorhinal region of the brain, stages III and IV when there is also involvement of limbic regions such as the hippocampus, and V and VI when there is extensive neocortical involvement. This should not be confused with the degree of senile plaque involvement, which progresses differently.
