= Neurotubule =

Microtubules in nervous tissue neurons

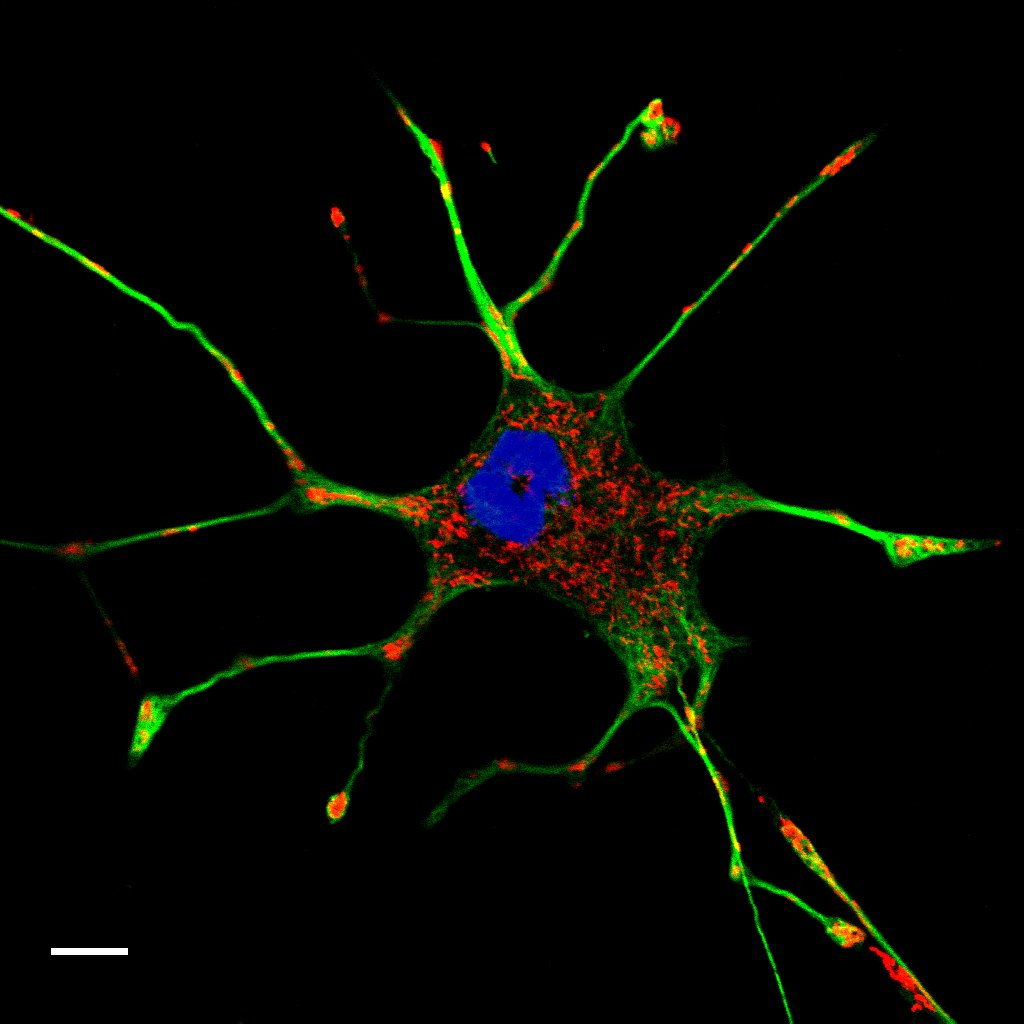
Multicolor fluorescence image of a neuron. Neurotubules are stained in green and mitochondria are stained in red.

Structure of a neurotubule.

Neurotubules are microtubules found in neurons in nervous tissues. Along with neurofilaments and microfilaments, they form the cytoskeleton of neurons. Neurotubules are undivided hollow cylinders that are made up of tubulin protein polymers and arrays parallel to the plasma membrane in neurons. Neurotubules have an outer diameter of about 23 nm and an inner diameter, also known as the central core, of about 12 nm. The wall of a neurotubule is about 5 nm in width. There is a non-opaque clear zone surrounding the neurotubule and it is about 40 nm in diameter. Like microtubules, neurotubules are greatly dynamic and their length can be adjusted by polymerization and depolymerization of tubulin.

Despite having similar mechanical properties, neurotubules are distinct from microtubules found in other cell types with regards to their function and intracellular arrangement. Most neurotubules are not anchored in the microtubule organizing center (MTOC) as conventional microtubules are. Instead, they are released for transport into dendrites and axons after their nucleation in the centrosome. Therefore, both ends of the neurotubules terminates in the cytoplasm instead.

Neurotubules are crucial in various cellular processes in neurons. Together with neurofilaments, they help to maintain the shape of a neuron and provide mechanical support. Neurotubules also aid the transportation of organelles, vesicles containing neurotransmitters, messenger RNA and other intracellular molecules inside a neuron.

== Structure and dynamics ==
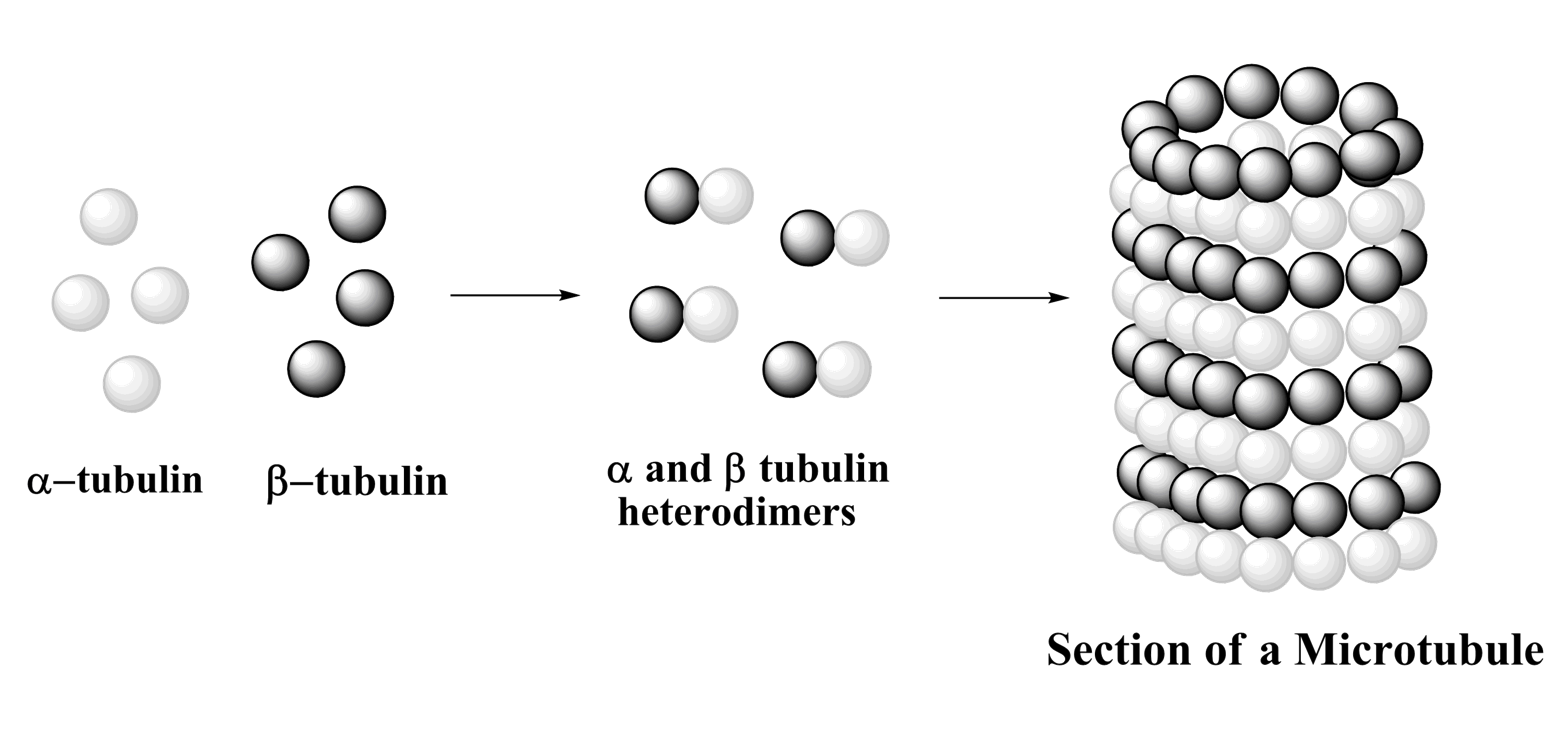
Formation of neurotubule

An animation showing a 'catastrophe' event, which can rapidly reduce the length of a growing neurotubule.

=== Composition ===
Like microtubules, neurotubules are made up of protein polymers of α-tubulin and β-tubulin, globular proteins that are closely related. They join together to form a dimer, called tubulin. Neurotubules are generally assembled by 13 protofilaments which are polymerized from tubulin dimers. As a tubulin dimer consists of one α-tubulin and one β-tubulin, one end of the neurotubule is exposed with the α-tubulin and the other end with β-tubulin, these two ends contribute to the polarity of the neurotubule – the plus (+) end and the minus (-) end. The β-tubulin subunit is exposed on the plus (+) end. The two ends differ in their growth rate: plus (+) end is the fast-growing end while minus (-) end is the slow-growing end. Both ends have their own rate of polymerization and depolymerization of tubulin dimers, net polymerization causes the assembly of tubulin, hence the length of the neurotubules.

=== Dynamic instability ===
The growth of neurotubules is regulated by dynamic instability. It is characterized by distinct phases of growth and rapid shrinkage. The transition from growth to rapid shrinkage is called a 'catastrophe'. The reverse is called a 'rescue'.

=== Polarized neurotubule arrays ===
Neurons have a polarized neurotubule network. Axons of most neurons contain neurotubules with plus (+) end uniformly pointing towards the axon terminal and minus (-) end orienting towards the cell body, similar to the general orientation of microtubules in other cell types. On the other hand, dendrites contain neurotubules with mixed polarities. Half of them point their plus (+) end towards the dendritic top and the other half points it towards the cell body, reminiscent of the anti-parallel microtubule array of the mitotic spindle.

The polarized neurotubule network forms the basis for selective cargo trafficking into axons and dendrites. For example, when mutations occur in dynein, a motor protein that is crucial in maintaining the uniform orientation of axonal neurotubules, the neurotubule polarity in axon becomes mixed. Dendritic proteins are mis-trafficked into axons as a result.

For unpolarized neurons, the neurites contain 80% neurotubules with plus (+) end facing the terminal.

== Axonal transport ==
Neurotubules are responsible for the trafficking of intracellular materials. The cargoes are transported by motor proteins that uses neurotubules as a 'track'. The axonal transport can be classified according to speed - fast or slow, and according to direction - anterograde or retrograde.

=== Fast and slow transportation ===
The cargoes are transported at a fast rate or a slow rate. The fast axonal transport has a rate of 50–500 mm per day, while the slow axonal transport was found to be 0.4 mm per day in goldfish, 1–10 mm per day in mammalian nerve. Transport of insoluble protein contributes to the fast movement while the slow transport is transporting up to 40% - 50% soluble protein. The speed of transport depends on the types of cargo to be transported. Neurotrophins, a family of proteins important for the survival of neuron, as well as organelles, such as mitochondria and endosomes, are transported at a fast rate. In contrast, structural proteins such as tubulin and neurofilament subunits are transported at lower rates. Proteins that are transported from the spinal cord to the foot can take up to a year to complete the journey.

=== Anterograde and retrograde transport ===
A kinesin "walking" on a neurotubule to transport cargoes.

Anterograde transport refers to the transportation of cargoes from the minus (-) end to the plus (+) end, whereas retrograde transport is the transportation of cargoes in the opposite direction. Anterograde transport is often the transportation from the cell body to the periphery of the neuron whereas retrograde transport brings organelles and vesicles away from the axon terminus to the cell body.

Anterograde transport is regulated by kinesins, a class of motor proteins. Kinesins have two head domains which work together like feet – one binds to the neurotubules, and then another binds while the former dissociates. The binding of ATP rises the affinity of kinesins for neurotubules. When ATP binds to one head domain, a conformational change will be induced in the head domain, causing it to bind tightly on the neurotubule. Another ATP then binds to another head domain while the former ATP is hydrolyzed and the head domain is dissociated. The process repeats itself as cycles so that kinesins move along the neurotubules together with the organelles and vesicular cargoes they carry.

Retrograde transport is regulated by dyneins, also a class of motor proteins. It shares similar structures with kinesins, as well as the transporting mechanism. It transports cargoes from the periphery to the cell body in neurons.

== Proteins associated with neurotubules ==
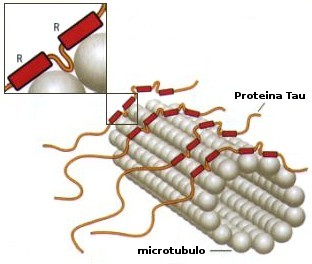
One most well-studied MAP is the Tau protein, due to its clinical significance in Alzheimer's disease.

Microtubule-associated proteins (MAPs) are proteins that interact with microtubules by binding to their tubulin subunits and regulating their stability. The MAPs make-up of neurotubules is notably different from microtubules of non-neuronal cells. For example, type II MAPs are exclusively found in neurons and not in other cells. The most well-studied ones include MAP2, and tau.

MAPs are differentially distributed within the neuronal cytoplasm. Their distribution varies across different stages of development of a neuron as well. A juvenile isoform of MAP2 is present on neurotubules of axons and dendrites of developing neurons but becomes down-regulated as neurons mature. The adult isoform of MAP2 is enriched in the neurotubules of dendrites and is virtually absent from axonal neurotubules. In contrast, tau is absent on neurotubules of dendrites and its presence is limited to axonal neurotubules. The phosphorylation of tau at certain sites is required for tau to bind to neurotubules. In a healthy neuron, this process does not occur at a significant degree in dendrites, causing the absence of tau on dendritic neurotubules. The binding of tau of different isoforms and of different levels of phosphorylation regulate the stability of neurotubule. It is found that neurotubules of the neurons in embryonic central nervous system contain more highly phosphorylated tau than those in adults. Additionally, tau is responsible for neurotubule bundling.

Microtubule plus end tracking proteins (+TIPs) are MAPs that accumulates in the plus end of microtubules. In neurotubules, +TIPs control the neurotubule dynamics, direction of growth, and interaction with components of cell cortex. They are important in neurite extension and axon outgrowth.

Many other non-neuron specific MAPs such as MAP1B and MAP6, are found on neurotubules. Moreover, the interaction between actin and some MAPs provide a potential link between neurotubules and actin filaments.

== Neurological disorders related to neurotubules ==
Neurotubule disintegration in Alzheimer's disease.

Disruption in the integrity and dynamics of neurotubules can interfere with the cellular functions they perform and cause various neurological disorders.

=== Alzheimer's disease ===
In Alzheimer's disease, hyperphosphorylation of tau protein causes the dissociation of tau from neurotubules and tau misfolding. The aggregation of misfolded tau forms insoluble neurofibrillary tangles which is a characteristic finding in Alzheimer's disease. This pathological change is called tauopathy. Neurotubules become prone to disintegration by microtubule-severing proteins when tau dissociates. As a result, essential processes in the neuron such as axonal transport and neural communication will be disrupted, forming the basis for neurodegeneration. Neurotubule disintegration is thought to occur by different mechanisms in axons and in dendrites.

The detachment of tau destabilizes the neurotubules by allowing excess severing by katanin, causing it to disintegrate. Neurotubules disintegration in the axon disrupts transport of mRNA and signalling molecules to the axon terminal. For dendrites, new evidence suggests that an abnormal tau invasion into dendrites causes a heightened level of dendritic TTLL6 (Tubulin polyglutamylase TTLL6), which elevates the polyglutamylation status of the neurotubules in dendrites. Because spastin displays strong preference for polyglutamylated microtubule, dendritic neurotubules become susceptible to spastin-induced disintegration. The loss of neurotubule networks in dendrites and axons, along with the formation of neurofibrillary tangles results in the impairment in the trafficking of important cargoes across the cell, which can eventually lead to apoptosis.

=== Lissencephaly ===
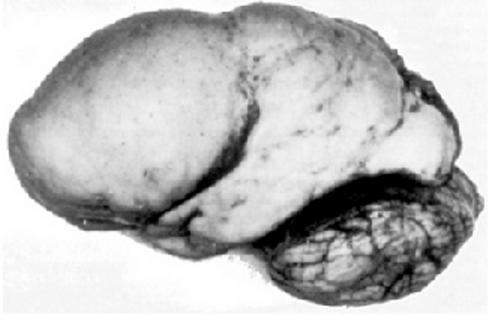
The characteristic "smooth brain" of an individual that suffers from lissencephaly, a defective neuronal migration disorder caused by mutations in neurotubule-related genes

Lissencephaly is a rare congenital condition in which the cerebrum loses its folds(gyri) and grooves(sulci), making the brain surface appear smooth. It is caused by defective neuronal migration. The failure of post-mitotic neurons in reaching their proper positions leads to the formation of a disorganized and thickened four-layer neocortex instead of the normal six-layer neocortex. The severity of lissencephaly ranges from a complete loss of brain folds (agyria) to a general reduction in cortical folds(pachygyria).

Neurotubule is central to the migration mechanism of neurons. The defective neural migration in individuals affected by lissencephaly is caused by mutations associated with neurotubule-related genes, such as LIS1 and DCX. LIS1 encodes an adaptor protein Lis1 that is responsible for stabilization of neurotubule during neuronal migration by minimizing neurotubule catastrophe. It also regulates the motor protein dynein that is crucial in the translocation of the nucleus along neurotubule. This action propels the soma of the neuron forward, which is an essential step in neuronal migration. In addition, mutations in LIS1 is found to disrupt the uniform plus-end-distal polarity in axons in animal models, causing the mistrafficking of dendritic proteins into axons. On the other hand, DCX encodes the protein doublecortin that interacts with Lis1 on top of supporting the 13 protofilament structure of neurotubule.

=== Chemotherapy-induced peripheral neuropathy ===
Chemotherapy-induced peripheral neuropathy is a pathological change in neurons caused by the disruption in the dynamics of neurotubules by chemotherapy drugs, manifesting in pain, numbness, tingling sensation and muscle weakness in limbs. It is an irreversible condition that affects about one-third of chemotherapy patients. Tubulin inhibitors inhibit mitosis in cancer cells by affecting the stability and dynamics of microtubules which forms the mitotic spindle responsible for chromosome segregation during mitosis, suppressing tumor growth.

However, the same drugs also affects neurotubules in neurons. Vinblastine binds to free tubulin and lower their polymerization capacity, promoting neurotubule depolymerization. On the other hand, paclitaxel binds to the cap of neurotubules, which prevents the conversion of tubulin-bound GTP into GDP, a process that promotes neurotubule depolymerization. For in vitro neurons treated with paclitaxel, the polarity pattern of neurotubule is disturbed, which can incur long term neuronal damage. In addition, over-stabilization of neurotubules interferes with their ability to perform essential cellular functions in neurons.
