= Catastrophin =

Proteins associated with the disassembly of cell microtubules

Catastrophin (Catastrophe-related protein) are proteins associated with the disassembly of microtubules. Catastrophins affect microtubule shortening, a process known as microtubule catastrophe.

== Microtubule dynamics ==
Microtubules are polymers of tubulin subunits arranged in cylindrical tubes. The subunit is made up of alpha and beta tubulin. GTP binds to alpha tubulin irreversibly. Beta tubulin binds GTP and hydrolyzes to GDP. It is the GDP bound to beta-tubulin that regulates the growth or disassembly of the microtubule. However, this GDP can be displaced by GTP. Beta-tubulin bounded to GTP are described as having a GTP-cap that enables stable growth.

Microtubules exist in either a stable or unstable state. The unstable form of a microtubule is often found in cells that are undergoing rapid changes such as mitosis. The unstable form exists in a state of dynamic instability where the filaments grow and shrink seemingly randomly. A mechanistic understanding of what causes microtubules to shrink is still being developed.

== Model of catastrophe ==
One model proposes that loss of the GTP-cap causes the GDP-containing protofilaments to shrink. Based on this GTP-cap model, catastrophe happens randomly. The model proposes that an increase in microtubule growth will correlate with a decrease in random catastrophe frequency or vice versa. The discovery of microtubule-associated proteins that change the rate of catastrophe while not impacting the rate of microtubule growth challenges this model of stochastic growth and shrinkage.

=== Increases ===
Oncoprotein 18/Stathmin has been shown to increase the frequency of catastrophe. Oncoprotein 18 (Op18) is a cytosolic protein that are found in abundance in either benign or malignant tumor site: through the complex timing of phosphorylation, this biomolecule regulates the depolymerization of microtubules. It has four sites of phosphorylation characterized by serine residues and are associated with cyclin-dependent protein kinases (CDKs): Ser16, Ser25, Ser38 and Ser63. There are two different models that are in contention regarding the destabilization of microtubules due to Op18: the inhibition of tubulin dimer formation or a catastrophe phenomena.

The Kinesin-related protein XKCM1 stimulates catastrophes in Xenopus microtubules.

The Kinesin-Related Protein 13 MCAK increases the frequency of catastrophe without affecting the promotion of microtubule growth.

=== Decreases ===
Doublecortin (DCX) shows an ability to inhibit catastrophe without affecting the microtubule growth rate

Xenopus Microtubule Protein 215 (XMAP215) has been implicated in inhibiting catastrophe.

== Mechanism ==
Some catastrophins affect catastrophe by binding to the ends of microtubules and promoting the dissociation of tubulin dimers.

Different mathematical models of microtubule development are being developed to take into account in vitro and in vivo observations. Meanwhile, there are new in vitro models of microtubule polymerization dynamics, of which catastrophins take a part in, being tested to emulate in vivo behaviors of microtubules.

== See also ==
- Microtubule-associated protein
- Kinesin
