= CKAP5 =

Protein-coding gene in humans

Identifiers
- Aliases: CKAP5, CHTOG, MSPS, TOG, TOGp, ch-TOG, cytoskeleton associated protein 5
- External IDs: OMIM: 611142; MGI: 1923036; GeneCards: CKAP5
Available structures
PDB	Ortholog search: PDBe RCSB
PDB	List of PDB id codes 4QMI, 4QMJ

Gene location (Human)
Chr.	Chromosome 11 (human)
Band	11p11.2	Start	46,743,048 bp
Band	11p11.2	End	46,846,308 bp

Gene location (Mouse)
Chr.	Chromosome 2 (mouse)
Band	2|2 E1	Start	91,357,107 bp
Band	2|2 E1	End	91,451,009 bp
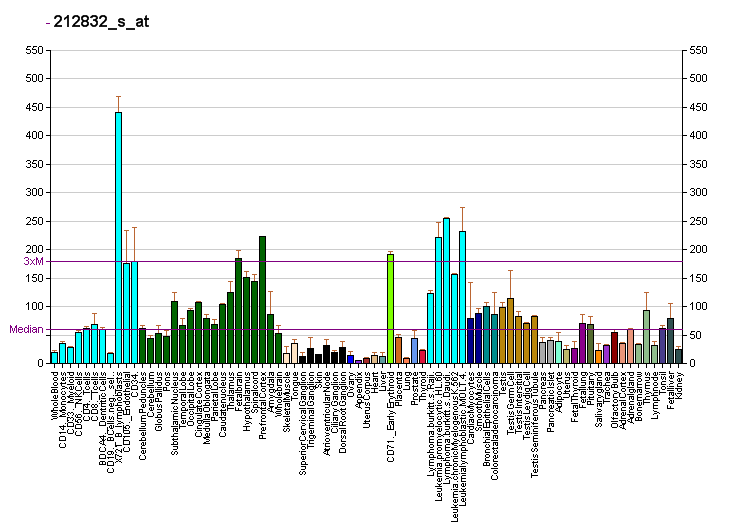
RNA expression pattern
Bgee	Human / Mouse (ortholog); Top expressed in: ventricular zone; ganglionic eminence; oocyte; right testis; stromal cell of endometrium; Achilles tendon; left testis; secondary oocyte; prefrontal cortex; cerebellar hemisphere / Top expressed in: tail of embryo; genital tubercle; ventricular zone; gastrula; ganglionic eminence; cerebellar cortex; maxillary prominence; secondary oocyte; mandibular prominence; zygote; More reference expression data
BioGPS	More reference expression data
Gene ontology
Molecular function	protein binding; cadherin binding; microtubule plus-end binding
Cellular component	cytoplasm; cytosol; centrosome; spindle pole; membrane; microtubule cytoskeleton; gamma-tubulin complex; microtubule organizing center; microtubule plus-end; cytoskeleton; chromosome, centromeric region; kinetochore; chromosome; spindle; nucleolus; plasma membrane; protein-containing complex
Biological process	RNA transport; establishment or maintenance of microtubule cytoskeleton polarity; cell division; spindle organization; G2/M transition of mitotic cell cycle; cell cycle; sister chromatid cohesion; centrosome cycle; microtubule polymerization; centrosome duplication; ciliary basal body-plasma membrane docking; regulation of G2/M transition of mitotic cell cycle; microtubule depolymerization
Sources:Amigo / QuickGO
Orthologs
Databases	NCBI: entry; OMA: entry
Species	Human	Mouse
Entrez	9793	75786
Ensembl	ENSG00000175216	ENSMUSG00000040549
UniProt	Q14008	A2AGT5
RefSeq (mRNA)	NM_014756; NM_001008938	NM_001165989; NM_029437
RefSeq (protein)	NP_001008938; NP_055571	NP_001159461; NP_083713
Location (UCSC)	Chr 11: 46.74 – 46.85 Mb	Chr 2: 91.36 – 91.45 Mb
PubMed search
- Wikidata
View/Edit Human	View/Edit Mouse

Cytoskeleton-associated protein 5 is a microtubule-associated protein that in humans is encoded by the CKAP5 gene. It is the homolog of the Xenopus protein XMAP215 and is also known as ch-Tog.

It has at least two distinct roles in spindle formation: it protects kinetochore microtubules from depolymerization by MCAK (KIF2C), and ch-Tog plays an essential role in centrosomal microtubule assembly, a function independent of MCAK activity.

== Interactions ==
CKAP5 has been shown to interact with TACC1.
