= RASSF1 =

Protein-coding gene in the species Homo sapiens

Identifiers
- Aliases: RASSF1, 123F2, NORE2A, RASSF1A, RDA32, REH3P21, Ras association domain family member 1
- External IDs: OMIM: 605082; MGI: 1928386; GeneCards: RASSF1
Available structures
| PDB | Ortholog search: PDBe RCSB |
| PDB | List of PDB id codes 2KZU |

Gene location (Human)
| Chr. | Chromosome 3 (human) |
| Band | 3p21.31 | Start | 50,329,782 bp |
| Band | 3p21.31 | End | 50,340,980 bp |

Gene location (Mouse)
| Chr. | Chromosome 9 (mouse) |
| Band | 9|9 F1 | Start | 107,428,754 bp |
| Band | 9|9 F1 | End | 107,439,466 bp |
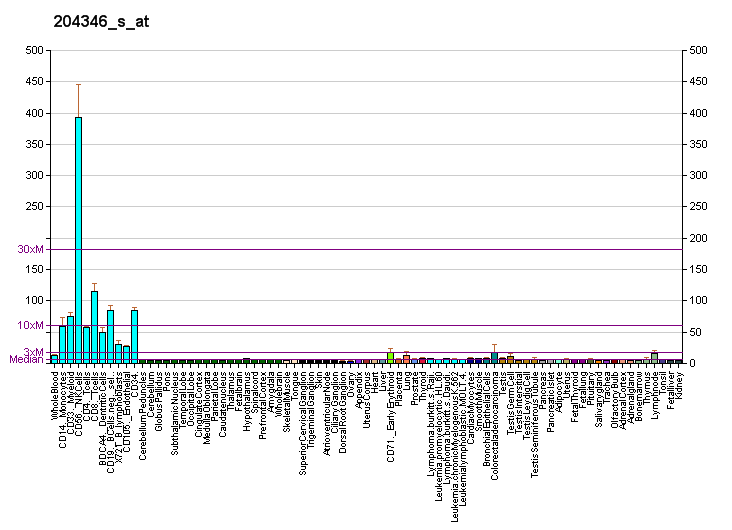
RNA expression pattern
| Bgee | Human / Mouse (ortholog); Top expressed in: granulocyte; tibial nerve; upper lobe of left lung; right lung; monocyte; spleen; canal of the cervix; left uterine tube; tibial arteries; right coronary artery / Top expressed in: Paneth cell; spermatocyte; condyle; fossa; internal carotid artery; submandibular gland; carotid body; external carotid artery; gastrula; ciliary body; More reference expression data |
| BioGPS | More reference expression data |
Gene ontology
| Molecular function | protein N-terminus binding; zinc ion binding; metal ion binding; protein binding; identical protein binding; protein heterodimerization activity |
| Cellular component | spindle pole; microtubule cytoskeleton; spindle; microtubule organizing center; microtubule; cytoskeleton; nucleus; cytoplasm |
| Biological process | intracellular signal transduction; protein stabilization; cellular response to DNA damage stimulus; cell cycle; Ras protein signal transduction; positive regulation of protein ubiquitination; signal transduction; regulation of microtubule cytoskeleton organization |
Sources:Amigo / QuickGO
Orthologs
| Databases | NCBI: entry; OMA: entry |
| Species | Human | Mouse |
| Entrez | 11186 | 56289 |
| Ensembl | ENSG00000068028 | ENSMUSG00000010067 |
| UniProt | Q9NS23 | Q99MK9 |
| RefSeq (mRNA) | NM_001206957; NM_007182; NM_170712; NM_170713; NM_170714 NM_170715; NM_170716; NM_170717 | NM_001243748; NM_019713 |
| RefSeq (protein) | NP_001193886; NP_009113; NP_733830; NP_733831; NP_733832 | NP_001230677; NP_062687 |
| Location (UCSC) | Chr 3: 50.33 – 50.34 Mb | Chr 9: 107.43 – 107.44 Mb |
| PubMed search |
- Wikidata
| View/Edit Human | View/Edit Mouse |

Ras association domain-containing protein 1 is a protein that in humans is encoded by the RASSF1 gene.

== Function ==
This gene encodes a protein similar to the RAS effector proteins.

The RASSF1 gene has eight isoforms, of which RASSF1A and RASSF1C are the most abundantly expressed. These two isoforms are omnipresent in normal cells, where they localize microtubules and regulate cell growth. When expressed normally, RASSF1A causes repression of cyclin A2 and cyclin D1, leading to cell cycle arrest. RASSF1A also plays an important role in microtubule stability by inhibiting histone deacetylase 6 (HDAC6), leading to an increase in acetylated microtubules, which are more stable. RASSF1A binds to microtubule-associated proteins (MAPs) that regulate microtubule stability. RASSF1A also modulates apoptosis. Interaction of RASSF1A with K-Ras activates the apoptotic MST2-LATS1 pathway.

RASSF1A is activated by mitogenic stimuli and K-Ras appears to be the major RASSF1A activator upon mitogenic stimulation.

Loss or altered expression of this gene has been associated with the pathogenesis of a variety of cancers, which suggests the tumor suppressor function of this gene. The inactivation of this gene was found to be correlated with the hypermethylation of its CpG-island promoter region. Methylation of CpG-island A is detected in normal tissues and does not affect gene expression. On the other hand, hypermethylation was associated with a loss of RASSF1A expression. The encoded protein was found to interact with DNA repair protein XPA. The protein was also shown to inhibit the accumulation of cyclin D1, and thus induce cell cycle arrest. Seven alternatively spliced transcript variants of this gene encoding distinct isoforms have been reported. When RASSF1A is epigenetically inactivated, it leads to microtubule instability, suppression of apoptosis, and cell cycle progression, which promotes tumorigenesis.

== Interactions ==
RASSF1 has been shown to interact with:

- CNKSR1,
- Death associated protein 6
- HRAS,
- MAP1B,
- MAP1S, and
- RASSF5.

== Pathology ==
Cervical cancer is known to be one of the most severe forms of cancer and is frequently associated with human papilloma virus (HPV). A few studies have been done to investigate the relationship between cervical cancers and RASSF1A, an isoform of RASSF1 that has been shown to suppress the proliferation in tumor cells. Through these studies, it was found that RASSF1A is commonly inactivated in adenocarcinomas (ACs) due to hypermethylation of the promoter region. However, this is not observed in squamous cell carcinomas (SCC) of the cervix, though they can be associated with HPV as well. It was found that RASSF1A was silenced in cancer cells when the promoter region was hypermethylated. It is speculated that cancer subtypes may develop due to the inverse relationship of RASSF1A and HPV. RASSF1A promoter hypermethylation and oncogenic HPV were detected in ACs, but SCCs displayed a high level of HPV DNA and no RASSF1A promoter methylation. Another study used Hela cells to study the potential therapeutic effects of RASSF1A. Hela cells are a line of cells that are derived from cervical cancer cells and are used in scientific research. When Hela cells were generated with RASSF1A expression, the growth of these cells decreased when compared to cells without RASSF1A expression. The rate of apoptosis in those cells had also increased with RASSF1A expression. Through these studies, it was indicated that RASSF1A expression could induce apoptosis and regulate proliferation to suppress tumors, making it a potential therapeutic mechanism for cervical cancers.

Aberrant methylation of RASSF1A has also been found in breast, lung, gastric, liver, and colorectal cancer.
