= CNKSR1 =

Protein-coding gene in humans

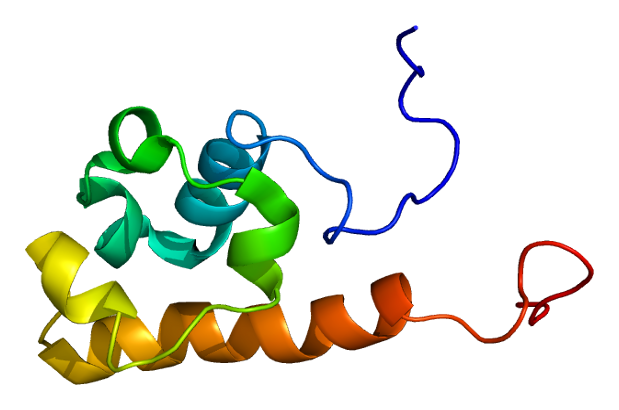

Identifiers
- Aliases: CNKSR1, CNK, CNK1, connector enhancer of kinase suppressor of Ras 1
- External IDs: OMIM: 603272; MGI: 2670958; GeneCards: CNKSR1
Available structures
PDB	Ortholog search: PDBe RCSB
PDB	List of PDB id codes 1WWV

Gene location (Human)
Chr.	Chromosome 1 (human)
Band	1p36.11	Start	26,177,484 bp
Band	1p36.11	End	26,189,884 bp

Gene location (Mouse)
Chr.	Chromosome 4 (mouse)
Band	4|4 D2.3	Start	133,955,352 bp
Band	4|4 D2.3	End	133,965,710 bp
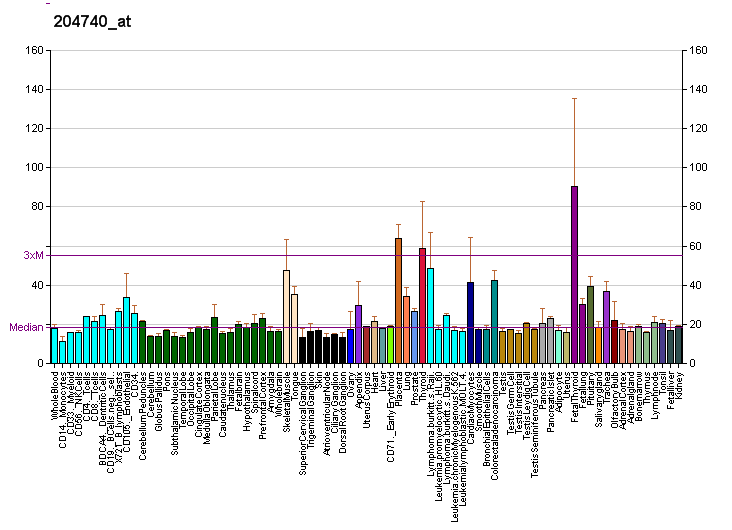
RNA expression pattern
Bgee	Human / Mouse (ortholog); Top expressed in: muscle of thigh; gastrocnemius muscle; right lobe of thyroid gland; right uterine tube; left lobe of thyroid gland; body of pancreas; mucosa of transverse colon; minor salivary glands; olfactory zone of nasal mucosa; Skeletal muscle tissue of rectus abdominis / Top expressed in: muscle of thigh; triceps brachii muscle; vastus lateralis muscle; temporal muscle; gastrocnemius muscle; knee joint; sternocleidomastoid muscle; medial head of gastrocnemius muscle; digastric muscle; tibialis anterior muscle; More reference expression data
BioGPS	More reference expression data
Gene ontology
Molecular function	protein-macromolecule adaptor activity; protein binding
Cellular component	cytoplasm; plasma membrane; cell cortex; membrane; cell-cell junction
Biological process	Ras protein signal transduction; Rho protein signal transduction; transmembrane receptor protein tyrosine kinase signaling pathway
Sources:Amigo / QuickGO
Orthologs
Databases	NCBI: entry; OMA: entry
Species	Human	Mouse
Entrez	10256	194231
Ensembl	ENSG00000142675	ENSMUSG00000028841
UniProt	Q969H4	A2A9K7
RefSeq (mRNA)	NM_001297647; NM_001297648; NM_006314	NM_001081047
RefSeq (protein)	NP_001284576; NP_001284577; NP_006305	NP_001074516
Location (UCSC)	Chr 1: 26.18 – 26.19 Mb	Chr 4: 133.96 – 133.97 Mb
PubMed search
- Wikidata
View/Edit Human	View/Edit Mouse

Connector enhancer of kinase suppressor of ras 1 is an enzyme that in humans is encoded by the CNKSR1 gene.

== Function ==
This gene is a necessary element in receptor tyrosine kinase pathways, possibly as a tyrosine phosphorylation target. It is involved in regulation of RAF in the MAPK pathway and may also play a role in a MAPK-independent pathway.

== Interactions ==
CNKSR1 has been shown to interact with RhoD and RASSF1.
