= Microtubule plus-end tracking protein =

Microtubule plus-end/positive-end tracking proteins or +TIPs are a type of microtubule associated protein (MAP) which accumulate at the plus ends of microtubules. +TIPs are arranged in diverse groups which are classified based on their structural components; however, all classifications are distinguished by their specific accumulation at the plus end of microtubules and their ability to maintain interactions between themselves and other +TIPs regardless of type. +TIPs can be either membrane bound or cytoplasmic, depending on the type of +TIPs. Most +TIPs track the ends of extending microtubules in a non-autonomous manner.

MTB Microtubule Plus End Tracking Protein (+TIP) of Neurospora crassa-pone.

== Regulation of microtubule dynamics ==
+TIPs' localization at the plus end of microtubules is a highly relevant aspect of microtubule regulation. A +TIP may promote microtubule growth by catalyzing the addition of tubulin at the plus end, or it may balance microtubules at the cell cortex. Many mechanisms of regulation are not fully understood.

In mitosis, +TIPs allocate microtubule addition and promote dynamical regulation at mitotic kinetochores. They also contribute to the extension of endoplasmic reticulum tubules at expanding microtubule ends. Furthermore, +TIPs aid in advocating organization of specialized microtubule arrays (an oft-cited example being the discrete arrangement of bipolar microtubule bundles in fission yeast).

Cep169-a-Novel-Microtubule-Plus-End-Tracking-Centrosomal-Protein-Binds-to-CDK5RAP2-and-Regulates-pone.0140968.s002

In addition to the basic known functions of +TIPs, the proteins are crucial for the linkages between microtubule ends and other cellular structures. +TIPs can bind microtubule ends to the cell cortex by colliding to plasma membrane-associated proteins or in the case of some +TIPs, directly to the actin fiber. Moreover, +TIP complexes in budding yeast are utilized for myosin-based transport of microtubule ends. Microtubule plus-end trafficking proteins engage in microtubule actin crosstalk, such as the CLIP-170 (+TIP) that controls actin polymerization—a necessity in mammalian phagocytosis.

+TIPs have been known for an extravagant accumulation by the centrosomes and other structural organizing centers of cells. This leads to the basic assumption that +TIPs may aid in microtubule nucleation and anchoring; however, its distinct role at centrosomes still awaits evidential findings. Overall, +TIPs play a critical part in morphogenesis, cell division, and motility.

== Classifications of +TIPs based on structural domains ==
About 20 different families of microtubule plus-end trafficking proteins (+TIPs) have been discovered since the first finding of +TIP CLIP-170 (CLIP1) in 1999. Since then +TIPs have been studied thoroughly and still are. The largest group of +TIPs contain complex and large proteins which have low-complexity sequence areas which are affluent in standard proline and serine residues. These types of proteins share a structural basic Ser-X-lle-Pro (where X can be any amino acid). This certain “code” allows these specific complex proteins to be recognizable to another family of +TIPs, known as the EB proteins. The end-binding proteins (EB proteins), have a precise N-terminal domain which is accountable for microtubule binding. The C-terminus however, sustains an alpha-helical coiled region which regulates parallel dimerization of EB monomers and comprises an acidic tail (attaining EEY/F motif) along with an EB homology domain (EBH). The EBH domain and or the EEY/F motif allow the EB proteins to physically interrelate with an array of +TIP in order to recruit them to microtubule ends.

Other classes of +TIPs include the cytoskeleton-associated proteins which are known for their glycine rich domain and a special conserved hydrophobic cavity which permits them to confer interactions with microtubules and EB proteins. There is also a class of +TIPs which substantiates a TOG domain. TOG domains mediate tubulin binding and are important for microtubule growth correlated activity. Basically, the brief classification of +TIPs can be made prior to the specific domain and function rudiments of the particular protein; there exist many more +TIPs, but these correspond to the main oriented and highly studied +TIPs.

The-Fission-Yeast-XMAP215-Homolog-Dis1p-Is-Involved-in-Microtubule-Bundle-Organization-pone.0014201.s011

EB Proteins

- EB1 and other proteins

SxlP proteins

- APC
- MACF
- STIM1

TOG proteins

- XMAP215
- CLASP

Motor proteins

- Tea2
- MCAK
- Dynein HC

Other proteins

- Dam1
- Lis1
- Kar9

== Types of +TIPs related to specific functions ==
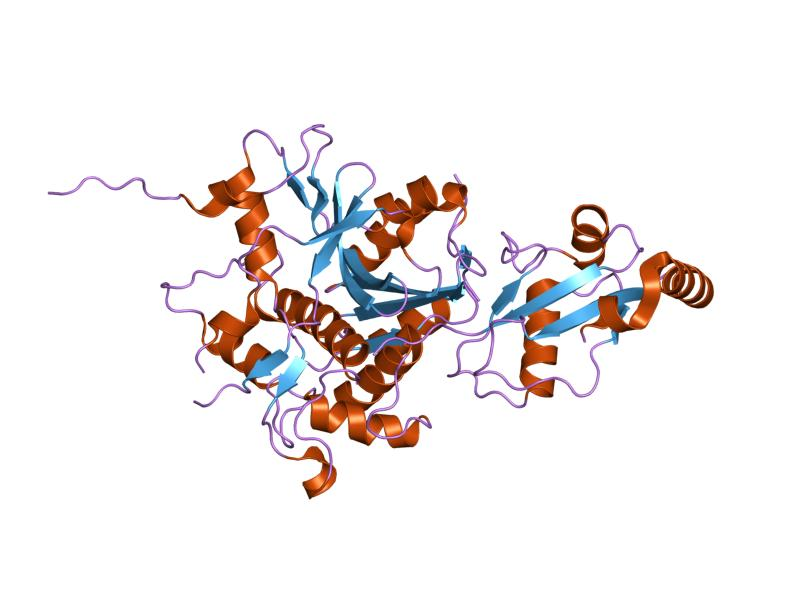
PDB 2z0d EBI

- Used in Catastrophe:
  - MCAK
- Used in Rescue:
  - CLIP-170
  - CLASP
- Stabilization:
  - CLASP
  - APC
  - MACF
- Polymerization:
  - EB1
  - XMAP215
- Depolymerization:
  - MCAK

Examination-of-actin-and-microtubule-dependent-APC-localisations-in-living-mammalian-cells-1471-2121-7-3-S11

- Communication with cellular components (+TIPs that interact with the specified structure):
  - Centrosomes
    - XMAP215
    - EB1
    - CLASP
    - APC
    - LIS1
    - FOP
    - Dynein
    - Dynactin
    - CDK5RAP2
    Microtubules
    - Ncd
    - Klp2
    Endoplasmic Reticulum
    - EB1
    - STIM1
    F-actin
    - MACF
    - APC
    - CLASP
    - CLIP-170
    - Kar9
    - RhoGEF2
    - p140Cap

Kebab-Kinetochore-and-EB1-Associated-Basic-Protein-That-Dynamically-Changes-Its-Localisation-during-pone.0024174.s001

  - Vesicles
    - Dynein
    - CLIP-170
    - Dynactin
    - Melanophilin
    Kinetochores
    - Dam1
    - CLASP
    - CLIP-170
    - APC
    - EB1
    - MCAK
    - LIS1
    - Dynein
    - Dynactin
    Cortex of the cell
    - CLASP
    - APC
    - MACF
    - CLIP-170
    - EB1
    - LIS1
    - Dynein
    - Dynactin

TOG-Proteins-Are-Spatially-Regulated-by-Rac-GSK3β-to-Control-Interphase-Microtubule-Dynamics-pone.0138966.s007

== Expanding the study of +TIPs ==
Scientists continue to further their understanding of certain mechanisms done by +TIPs and the range of different types of these proteins. Understanding of microtubule plus-end trafficking proteins has greatly expanded since the discovery of CLAP1, and surely will continue to expand as predicted by many researchers and cytologists. Currently, +TIPs may play critical roles in more than just the general aspects known; also with other particular cell structures along with the known structures which are the endoplasmic reticulum, F-actin, vesicles, microtubules, kinetochores, cell cortex, and centrosomes.

== See also ==
- Microtubules
- Microtubule associated protein
- Proteins
- Mitotic spindle
- Tubulin
- Endoplasmic Reticulum
- Kinetochores
- Centrosomes
- F-actin
