= DIAPH2 =

Protein-coding gene in humans

Identifiers
- Aliases: DIAPH2, DIA, DIA2, DRF2, POF, POF2, diaphanous related formin 2, POF2A
- External IDs: OMIM: 300108; MGI: 1858500; GeneCards: DIAPH2

Gene location (Human)
Chr.	X chromosome (human)
Band	Xq21.33	Start	96,684,712 bp
Band	Xq21.33	End	97,604,997 bp

Gene location (Mouse)
Chr.	X chromosome (mouse)
Band	X|X E3	Start	128,650,491 bp
Band	X|X E3	End	129,366,583 bp
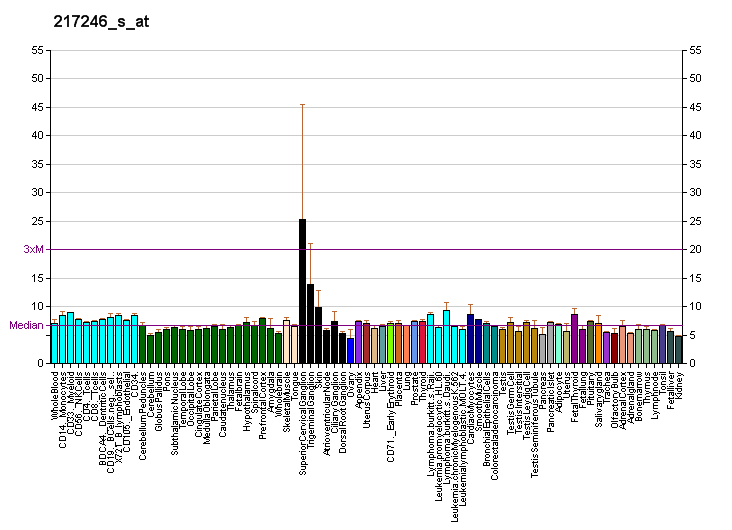

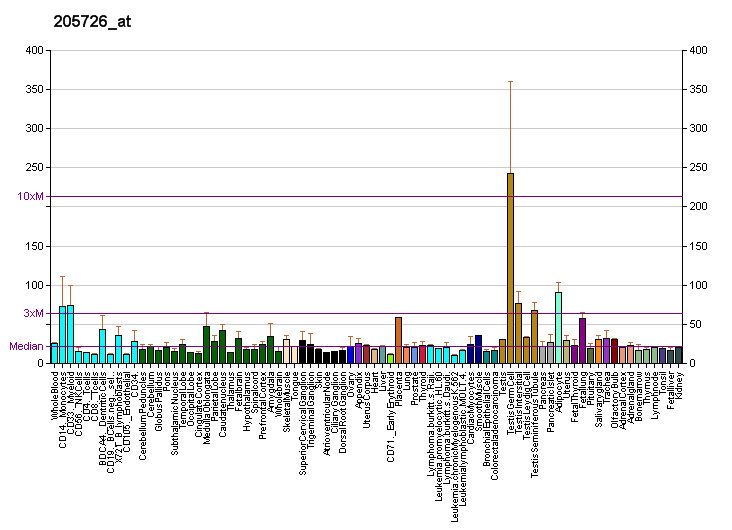

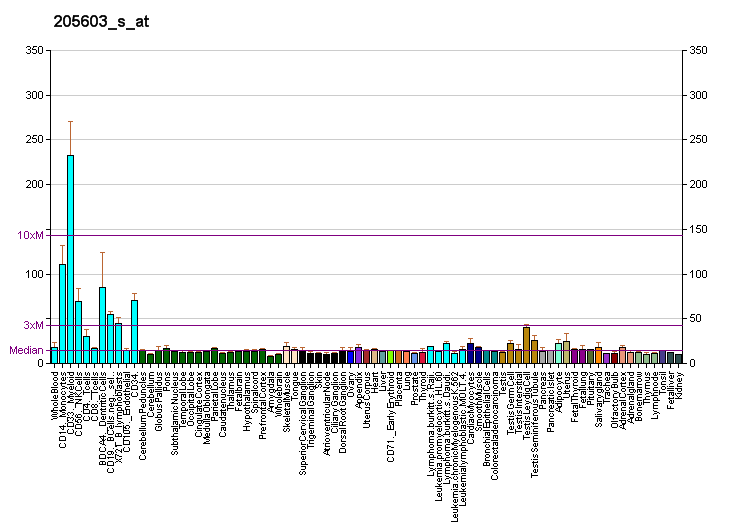
RNA expression pattern
Bgee	Human / Mouse (ortholog); Top expressed in: buccal mucosa cell; parietal pleura; bronchial epithelial cell; lower lobe of lung; visceral pleura; hair follicle; Achilles tendon; Epithelium of choroid plexus; placenta; sperm / Top expressed in: olfactory tubercle; dorsal striatum; ascending aorta; stroma of bone marrow; iris; nucleus accumbens; aortic valve; left lung lobe; carotid body; epithelium of stomach; More reference expression data
BioGPS	More reference expression data
Gene ontology
Molecular function	actin binding; signaling receptor binding
Cellular component	cytoplasm; cytosol; endosome; early endosome; nucleolus; intracellular membrane-bounded organelle; endoplasmic reticulum
Biological process	multicellular organism development; cell differentiation; female gamete generation; actin cytoskeleton organization; actin filament organization; oogenesis; cellular component organization
Sources:Amigo / QuickGO
Orthologs
Databases	NCBI: entry; OMA: entry
Species	Human	Mouse
Entrez	1730	54004
Ensembl	ENSG00000147202	ENSMUSG00000034480
UniProt	O60879	O70566
RefSeq (mRNA)	NM_007309; NM_006729	NM_017398; NM_172493
RefSeq (protein)	NP_006720; NP_009293	NP_766081
Location (UCSC)	Chr X: 96.68 – 97.6 Mb	Chr X: 128.65 – 129.37 Mb
PubMed search
- Wikidata
View/Edit Human	View/Edit Mouse

Protein diaphanous homolog 2 is a protein that in humans is encoded by the DIAPH2 gene.

== Function ==
This gene may play a role in the development and normal function of the ovaries. Mutations of this gene have been linked to premature ovarian failure. Alternative splicing results in two protein isoforms.

== Interactions ==
DIAPH2 has been shown to interact with RhoD.
