= RhoD =

Protein-coding gene in the species Homo sapiens

RHOD
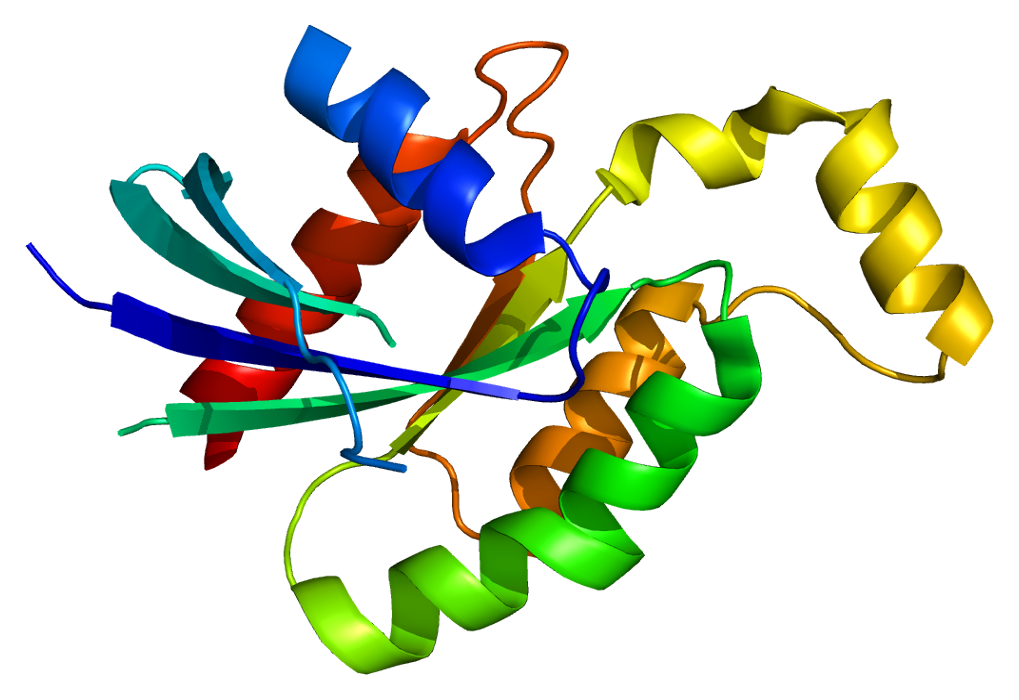

Identifiers
- Aliases: RHOD, ARHD, RHOHP1, RHOM, Rho, RhoD, ras homolog family member D
- External IDs: OMIM: 605781; MGI: 108446; GeneCards: RHOD
Available structures
PDB	Ortholog search: PDBe RCSB
PDB	List of PDB id codes 2J1L
Enzyme activity
EC #	BRENDA	ExPASy	KEGG	MetaCyc
3.6.5.2	↗	↗	↗	↗

Gene location (Human)
Chr.	Chromosome 11 (human)
Band	11q13.2	Start	67,056,847 bp
Band	11q13.2	End	67,072,017 bp

Gene location (Mouse)
Chr.	Chromosome 19 (mouse)
Band	19|19 A	Start	4,475,487 bp
Band	19|19 A	End	4,489,460 bp
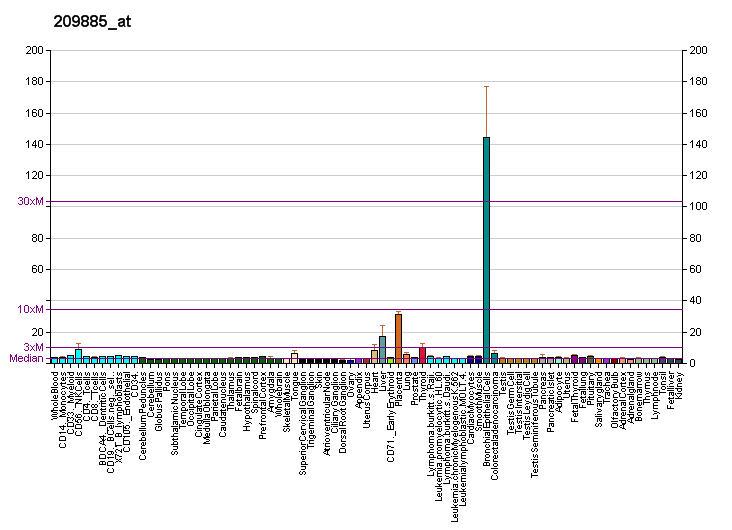

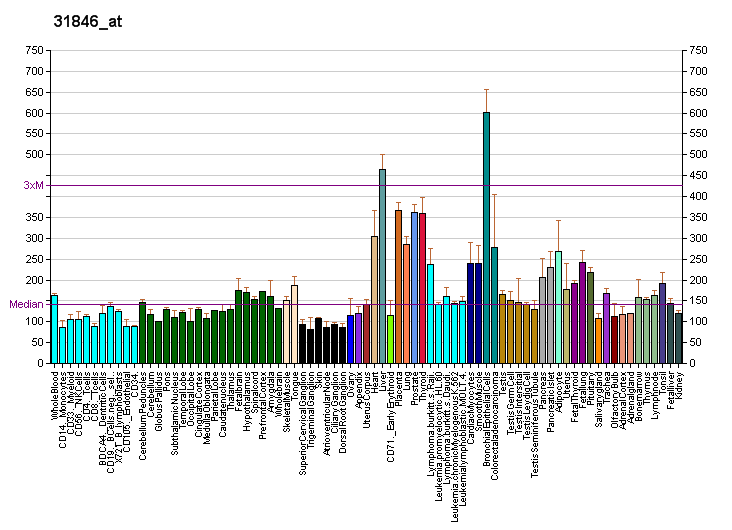
RNA expression pattern
Bgee	Human / Mouse (ortholog); Top expressed in: pancreatic ductal cell; right lobe of liver; apex of heart; skin of leg; skin of abdomen; gums; gingival epithelium; left ventricle; skin of thigh; amniotic fluid / Top expressed in: saccule; otic placode; otic vesicle; lip; esophagus; corneal stroma; choroid plexus of fourth ventricle; right kidney; jejunum; duodenum; More reference expression data
BioGPS	More reference expression data
Gene ontology
Molecular function	nucleotide binding; protein kinase binding; GTP binding; GTPase activity
Cellular component	early endosome; endosome membrane; endosome; membrane; cytosol; plasma membrane; intracellular anatomical structure; cytoplasm; cell cortex; cell division site; intracellular membrane-bounded organelle
Biological process	positive regulation of cell adhesion; focal adhesion assembly; actin filament bundle assembly; regulation of actin cytoskeleton reorganization; positive regulation of cell migration; lamellipodium assembly; Rho protein signal transduction; regulation of focal adhesion assembly; protein targeting; regulation of small GTPase mediated signal transduction; small GTPase mediated signal transduction; actin filament organization; regulation of cell shape; cell migration; regulation of cell migration; establishment or maintenance of actin cytoskeleton polarity; regulation of actin cytoskeleton organization
Sources:Amigo / QuickGO
Orthologs
Databases	NCBI: entry; OMA: entry
Species	Human	Mouse
Entrez	29984	11854
Ensembl	ENSG00000173156	ENSMUSG00000041845
UniProt	O00212	P97348
RefSeq (mRNA)	NM_014578; NM_001300886	NM_007485; NM_001329989
RefSeq (protein)	NP_001287815; NP_055393	NP_001316918; NP_031511
Location (UCSC)	Chr 11: 67.06 – 67.07 Mb	Chr 19: 4.48 – 4.49 Mb
PubMed search
- Wikidata
View/Edit Human	View/Edit Mouse

RhoD (Ras homolog gene family, member D) is a small (~21 kDa) signaling G protein (more specifically a GTPase), and is a member of the Rac subfamily of the family Rho family of GTPases. It is encoded by the gene RHOD.

It binds GTP and is involved in endosome dynamics and reorganization of the actin cytoskeleton, and it may coordinate membrane transport with the function of the cytoskeleton.

== Interactions ==
RhoD has been shown to interact with CNKSR1 and DIAPH2.
