= XMAP215-Dis1 family =

The XMAP215/Dis1 family is a highly conserved group of microtubule-associated proteins (MAPs) in eukaryotic organisms. These proteins are unique MAPs because they primarily interact with the growing-end (plus-end) of microtubules. This special property classifies this protein family as plus-end tracking proteins (+TIPs).

== Structure ==
The basic structure of the protein family consists of TOG (Tumor Overexpressed Gene) domains, ranging from 2-5 units. The family is categorized into three groups based on the number of TOG domains that specific protein contains. Higher eukaryotic organisms, categorized in the first group, contain five, N-terminus TOG domains and a variable region that connects to a C-terminal domain. These domains are highly conserved monomeric sequences. The second group consists of only the Caenorhabditis elegans protein zyg-9, which has three TOG domains. It is similar, though, to higher eukaryotes because of its variable region and C-terminal domain. The third group consists of lower eukaryotic organisms, mainly yeast, that contain only two TOG domains and a coiled-coil domain.

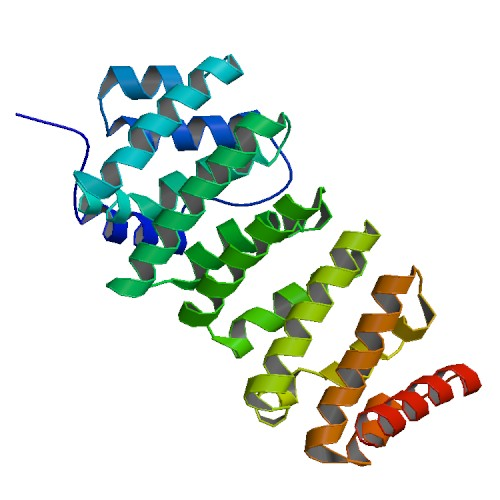
The TOG3 domain in C. elegans zyg-9

Thorough analysis of the TOG3 domain in zyg-9 provides a basic understanding of this domain that is conserved throughout all members of the XMAP215/Dis1 family. Each domain consists of six HEAT (Huntingtin, Elongation factor 3, the PR65/A subunit of protein phosphatase 2A and the lipid kinase Tor) repeat units that are adjacently aligned. Each HEAT molecule consists of two α helices that are connected by a single loop. These α helices form the wide, flat surface of the domain. The loops between HEAT repeats and between individual α helices run along the short side of the domain. This short region is necessary for binding to tubulin. An additional HEAT repeat, localized between the first and second HEAT repeat, is exclusive to the TOG3 domain in zyg-9 and the TOG5 domains in the first group family proteins.

The C-terminal end of the protein has group-specific characteristics. In the third protein group, the coiled-coil domain is essential for dimerization in simple eukaryotes. This is because simple eukaryotes such as yeast produce proteins in dimers. In first and second groups, the C-terminal domain is known to interact with transforming acidic coiled-coil protein 3 (TACC3), which transports the protein to the centrosomes during mitosis.

== Function ==
=== Mechanism model ===
XMAP215/Dis1 proteins can add or remove tubulin dimers in a two-step process. XMAP215 has been shown to bind to tubulin in a 1:1 complex, meaning that XMAP215 might not bind multiple tubulin dimers at once. The αβ-tubulin dimer is known to interact with at least TOG domain, TOG1, which tightly binds inside the bend of the tubulin dimer and is also found beyond the direct plus-end of the microtubule. The tubulin then “straightens,” which forms a weak interaction with TOG1. TOG2, however, can form a tight bind to straight tubulin. Much like a hand-off, TOG1 releases the dimer, which then binds to TOG2. TOG2 then integrates the tubulin dimer into the lattice, extending the microtubule.

=== Microtubule function ===
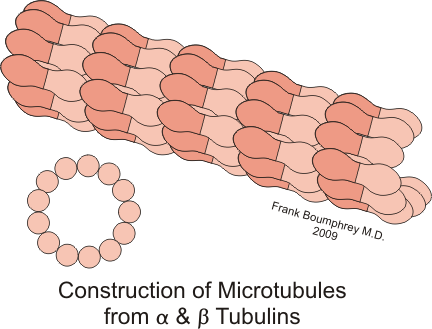
Microtubule lattice with αβ-tubulin dimers

XMAP215/Dis1 family proteins promote both growth and reduction of microtubule length, depending on the concentration of free tubulin; this is known as dynamic instability. Protein behavior is also cell-cycle dependent. Reducing ch-TOG expression leads to improper alignment of the chromosomes during metaphase. One study suggests that in Schizosaccharomyces pombe, the protein Cdc2 regulates Dis1 through phosphorylation and dephosphorylation during metaphase and anaphase. Phosphorylating Dis1 leads to localization at the kinetochores during metaphase, whereas dephosphorylation during anaphase leads to an accumulation of Dis1 on microtubule spindles. In Drosophila, the family member Mini spindles (Msps) is essential for maintaining the integrity of mitotic spindles, which are important for separating chromosomes during mitosis. Reducing Msps activity creates short microtubules, which describes the name of the gene. Msps is also important during oogenesis. When oocytes are depleted of Msps expression, bicoid mRNA localization is less efficient during early stages of oogenesis, but then completely dispersed later in development. Msps is not only responsible for transporting bicoid mRNA throughout the cell, but it also localizes mRNA to the anterior (head) end of the oocyte Additionally, this gene is critical for the organization of tubular endoplasmic reticulum and in Exuperantia protein localization. Exuperantia is necessary for accumulating bicoid mRNA in the head region of the oocyte. Another key function of XMAP215 in microtubule dynamics is in the regulation of axon guidance. This is when microtubules extend into or retract from the axonal growth cone, which guides movement by receiving concentrated signaling cues. In Drosophila, Msps promotes microtubule dynamics in axonal guidance at the embryonic ventral nerve cord midline.

== Interactions with plus-end tracking proteins (+TIPs) ==
Plus-end tracking proteins are enzymes that localize and interact at the plus-end of microtubules. When tagged with green fluorescent protein (GFP), +TIPs can be visualized and tracked in the direction of microtubule growth. As a +TIP, XMAP215/Dis1 family proteins interact with other +TIPs.

=== EB1 ===
In Xenopus, XMAP215 and EB1 have been reported to interact with each other. While XMAP215 functions to both grow and shrink the microtubule, EB1 is only present during growth. Alone, these proteins have mild effects on microtubule growth. Together, these proteins act in synergy and lengthen microtubules at a much greater rate. Without XMAP215, EB1 does not have a tubulin polymerase that can efficiently construct the microtubule plus-end with free tubulin. Without EB1, XMAP215 continues to add tubulin to the plus-end, but the integrity of the microtubule lattice becomes compromised. This is because EB1 binds to the microtubule lattice as a stabilizer to keep the tubulin straight.

== Members ==
=== Group 1 (5 TOG domains) ===
XMAP215: Xenopus Microtubule-associated protein, found in Xenopus species. The number 215 refers to the size of the protein, which is 215 kDa. This protein was discovered in 1987 through the investigation of microtubule regulation in Xenopus oocytes. In 2008, the protein was identified as a plus-end microtubule polymerase.

ch-Tog: colonic and hepatic Tumour Overexpressing Gene, found in Homo sapiens. It was first identified in humans in 1996 as an overexpressed gene in tumors, but was recognized for its plus-end microtubule regulation in 1998.

Msps: Mini spindles. This protein is found in Drosophila species. This protein was discovered in 1999.

DdCP224: Dictyostelium discoideum Centrosomal Protein. This protein's size is approximately 224 kDa. It was detected in 2000 through immunoscreening of DNA libraries for centrosomal proteins.

Mor1: microtubule organisation gene 1. Found in Arabidopsis thaliana. This protein was discovered in 2001 as an organizer of cortical microtubules

=== Group 2 (3 TOG domains) ===
zyg-9: zygotic defective mutant, found in C. elegans. In 1976, this gene was identified when zygotes, with such a mutation, failed to hatch. Zyg-9 was identified as a microtubule regulator in 1980.

=== Group 3 (2 TOG domains) ===
alp14/Dis1: altered polarity/Defect in sister chromatid disjoining. These proteins are found in S. pombe. Dis1 is the preferred homologue in colder temperatures, while alp14 is preferred in higher temperatures. Dis1 was recognized in 1988, whereas its homologue alp14 was identified in 2001

Stu2p: suppressors of a tubulin mutation. This protein is found in Saccharomyces cerevisiae. It was discovered in 1997 through a screen and was found to influence microtubule regulation. AlpA: alkaline phosphotase, found in Aspergillus nidulans. In 2007, this protein was identified to interact with microtubule plus ends and also localize at spindle bodies, which is characteristic of XMAP215/Dis1 family proteins.
