= MAP6 =

Protein-coding gene in the species Homo sapiens

Identifiers
- Aliases: MAP6, MTAP6, N-STOP, STOP, MAP6-N, microtubule associated protein 6
- External IDs: OMIM: 601783; MGI: 1201690; GeneCards: MAP6

Gene location (Human)
Chr.	Chromosome 11 (human)
Band	11q13.5	Start	75,586,918 bp
Band	11q13.5	End	75,669,038 bp

Gene location (Mouse)
Chr.	Chromosome 7 (mouse)
Band	7|7 E1	Start	98,916,654 bp
Band	7|7 E1	End	98,986,344 bp
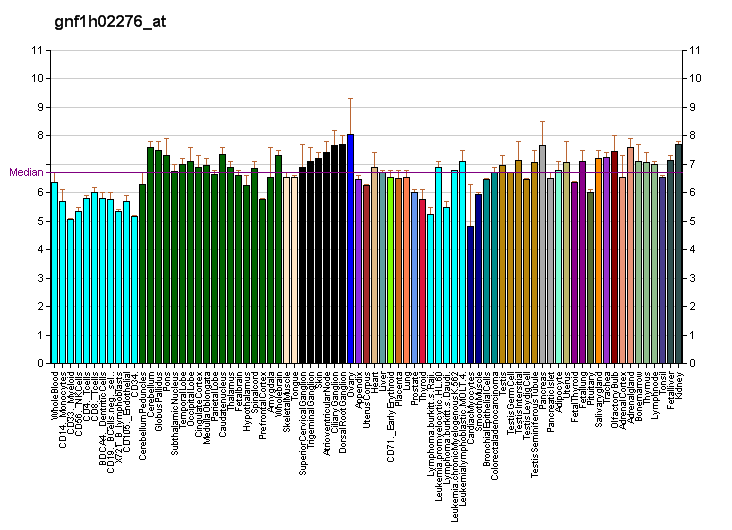

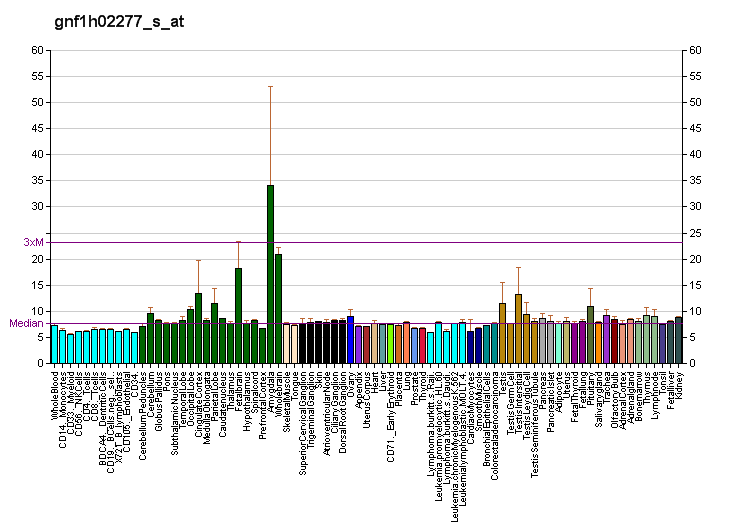

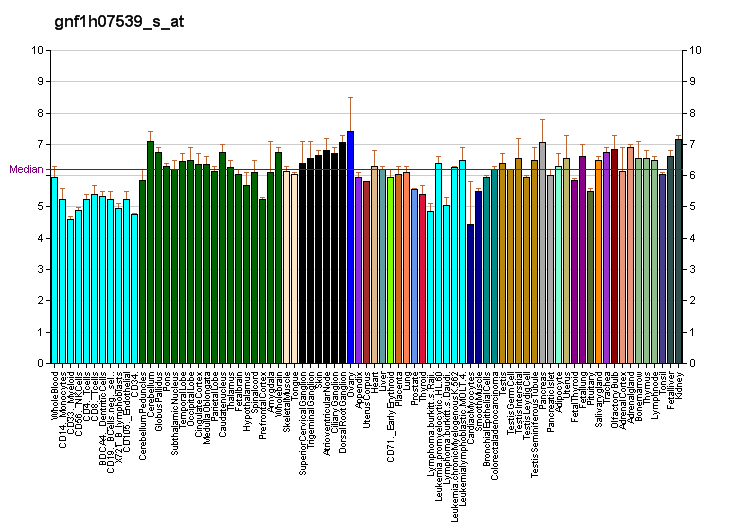
RNA expression pattern
Bgee	Human / Mouse (ortholog); Top expressed in: right frontal lobe; pituitary gland; bronchial epithelial cell; nucleus accumbens; ganglionic eminence; right uterine tube; Brodmann area 9; anterior pituitary; hypothalamus; caudate nucleus / Top expressed in: neural layer of retina; visual cortex; superior frontal gyrus; lumbar spinal ganglion; primary visual cortex; pontine nuclei; dorsal tegmental nucleus; superior ganglion of vagus nerve; medial vestibular nucleus; arcuate nucleus; More reference expression data
BioGPS	More reference expression data
Gene ontology
Molecular function	protein binding; calmodulin binding; microtubule binding
Cellular component	cytoplasm; perinuclear region of cytoplasm; Golgi apparatus; microtubule; cytoskeleton; membrane; axon; dendrite; transport vesicle membrane; cytoplasmic vesicle; cell projection; Golgi-associated vesicle; cis-Golgi network
Biological process	lysosome localization; microtubule cytoskeleton organization; dendrite morphogenesis; cytoskeleton-dependent intracellular transport; positive regulation of axonogenesis; regulation of microtubule cytoskeleton organization
Sources:Amigo / QuickGO
Orthologs
Databases	NCBI: entry; OMA: entry
Species	Human	Mouse
Entrez	4135	17760
Ensembl	ENSG00000171533	ENSMUSG00000055407
UniProt	Q96JE9	Q7TSJ2
RefSeq (mRNA)	NM_033063; NM_207577	NM_001043355; NM_001048167; NM_010837
RefSeq (protein)	NP_149052; NP_997460	NP_001036820; NP_001041632; NP_034967
Location (UCSC)	Chr 11: 75.59 – 75.67 Mb	Chr 7: 98.92 – 98.99 Mb
PubMed search
- Wikidata
View/Edit Human	View/Edit Mouse

Microtubule-associated protein 6 (MAP6) or stable tubule-only polypeptide (STOP or STOP protein) is a protein that in humans is encoded by the MAP6 gene.

This gene encodes a microtubule-associated protein (MAP). The encoded protein is a calmodulin binding, and calmodulin-regulated protein that is involved in microtubule stabilization.

MAP6 localization is present throughout neuronal maturation and axonal development. It protects microtubules under drug and cold induced depolymerization by reducing the shrinking rate and promoting rescue events. A deficit in MAP6 protein levels is characterized by behavioral impairments, most notably schizophrenia.

== Structure ==
A murine isoform of MAP6, MAP6-N, has 3 major domains:

12 calmodulin binding domains, 3 Mn domains, and 3-6 Mc domains.

- Calmodulin-binding domains: 12 of the calmodulin-binding domains exist in MAP6-N. In vitro studies show that Ca^{+2}-Calmodulin (CaM) binding to MAP6 prevents binding to microtubules. According to a model proposed by Ramkumar and collaborators, upon synaptic activity, the Ca^{+2}-CaM complex forms, where it detaches MAP6 from adjacent microtubules, and activates Ca^{+2}/calmodulin-dependent protein kinase II (CaMKII). When Ca^{+2} level decreases, CaM is released from MAP6 and is then phosphorylated by CaMKII.The phosphorylated MAP6 cannot re-associate with microtubules. Instead, the phosphorylated MAP6 binds and stabilizes synaptic F-actin. The large number of calmodulin-binding domains overlapping the Mn and Mc modules in MAP6 provides evidence that MAP6 binding to microtubules is likely to be tightly regulated in cells.
- Mn domains: 3 of these exist in MAP6-N. They partially overlap the calmodulin binding domain and stabilize microtubules against both cold and nocodazole-induced depolymerization by forming bridges with adjacent tubulin heterodimers either between protofilaments, or longitudinally within the same protofilament.
- Mc domains: The Mc domains are central repeat domains that each encompass a calmodulin binding region. Mc regions are only in present in vertebrates and are thus absent from fish, frogs, lizards or birds. In vitro studies show Mc modules act as cold sensors, where cold temperature induces a conformational change in Mc modules that subsequently allow them to interact with microtubules.

MAP6 can also associate with the Golgi apparatus through palmitoylation of their N-terminal domains. N-terminal cysteines of MAP6 domain-containing protein 1 (MAP6d1), a postnatally expressed isoform in the mouse central nervous system, are palmitoylated by DHHC-type palmitoylating enzymes. Through palmitoylation, MAP6 can be targeted to a newly formed axon and is involved in microtubule and membrane shuttling.

== Function and Regulation ==
MAP6 is a multi-functional protein. While it is involved with microtubules, it can also be involved in neuroreceptor homeostasis, endocytosis, nuclear function, and signal transduction pathways.

MAP6 interacts with microtubules by localizing in the lumen of microtubules. MAP6 alters the conformation of a growing microtubules by inducing the microtubule to coil into a left-handed helix with a long-range helicity with a pitch of 5.5 ± 0.8 μm. This coiling pattern requires the Mn and Mc modules, as well as the first 35 N-terminal residues. MAP6 is also shown to be involved at the tip of the microtubule. Additionally, during microtubule polymerization, MAP6 induces the formation of stable apertures in the lattice, which is likely used to relieve mechanical stress.

In neuroreceptor homeostasis, MAP6 was consistently identified in synaptic proteomes, even though microtubules are only transiently present in both pre- and post-synaptic compartments of axonal boutons or dendritic spines. This suggests that MAP6 has microtubule independent roles as well. MAP6 is also associated with subicular neurons from the hippocampus, where it is involved with the receptors Neuropilin1, Plexin D1, and VEGFR2—which together make up the tripartite Semaphorin 3E receptor, which aids in the formation of the fornix. A knockout of the MAP6 gene in mice led to the absence of the post-commissural part of the fornix, producing a disconnect between the hippocampus and the hypothalamus.

MAP6 is also involved in the olfactory bulb and the hippocampus, two regions where adult neurogenesis is known to occur. In neurogenesis studies with mice with the MAP6 knockout, there was an increase in the number of proliferating cells in the olfactory epithelium with increased apoptosis, while there was a decrease in proliferating cells in the hippocampus. The exact mechanism behind how MAP6 aids in neurogenesis is unclear.

A MAP6-related protein, TbSAXO, has been discovered in Trypanosoma brucei. The domains of the protein responsible for microtubule binding and stabilizing share homologies with the Mn domains of MAP6.TbSAXO is an axonemal protein that plays a role in flagellum motility, showing that a MAP6-related protein can play a role in flagellum motility as well.

== Psychiatric disorders ==
MAP6 functions as a neuronal protein that aids in microtubule stabilization. Studies with mice that have knockouts of MAP6 (MAP6 KO mice) are viable, but they show biological and behavioral alterations, which are similar to symptoms of schizophrenia.

=== Schizophrenia ===
MAP6 KO mice show hyperactivity, fragmentation of normal activity, anxiety-like behavior, social withdrawal, and impaired maternal behavior leading to the death of pups. These symptoms correspond to changes in synaptic plasticity, which lead to large alterations in synaptic responses.The symptoms of the MAP6 KO mice are mainly treated by antipsychotic drugs or Epothilone D (Epo D), a microtubule-stabilizing molecule, which has also been shown to alleviate the synaptic plasticity defects in MAP6 KO mice. Therefore, MAP6 KO mice serve as useful models for the treatment and pathophysiology of schizophrenia. In addition to schizophrenia, MAP6 KO mice also display a reduced volume of the cerebellum and the thalamus. Moreover, the mice had other brain anomalies, characterized by an altered size, integrity and spatial orientation of some neuronal tracks such as the anterior commissure, the mammillary tract, the corpus callosum, the corticospinal tract, the fasciculus retroflexus and the fornix.

=== Autism ===
In a study conducted with the plasmas of children displaying classic-onset autism, the concentration of MAP6 protein levels were lower than that of healthy children. In MAP6 KO mice conducted in the same study, there was a reduction in pre-synaptic glutamate vesicle density. Low glutamate release levels are common in autism, which could explain the reduced expression of the MAP6 protein. Another hypothesis is that less MAP6 can impair the myelin development in oligodendrocytes, which can lead to abnormalities in synaptic function and myelination that could explain the behavioral phenotypes in autism.
