= MAP1S =

Protein-coding gene in the species Homo sapiens

Identifiers
- Aliases: MAP1S, BPY2IP1, C19orf5, MAP8, VCY2IP-1, VCY2IP1, microtubule associated protein 1S
- External IDs: OMIM: 607573; MGI: 2443304; HomoloGene: 10047; GeneCards: MAP1S; OMA:MAP1S - orthologs

Gene location (Human)
| Chr. | Chromosome 19 (human) |
| Band | 19p13.11 | Start | 17,719,242 bp |
| Band | 19p13.11 | End | 17,734,513 bp |

Gene location (Mouse)
| Chr. | Chromosome 8 (mouse) |
| Band | 8|8 B3.3 | Start | 71,358,576 bp |
| Band | 8|8 B3.3 | End | 71,370,173 bp |
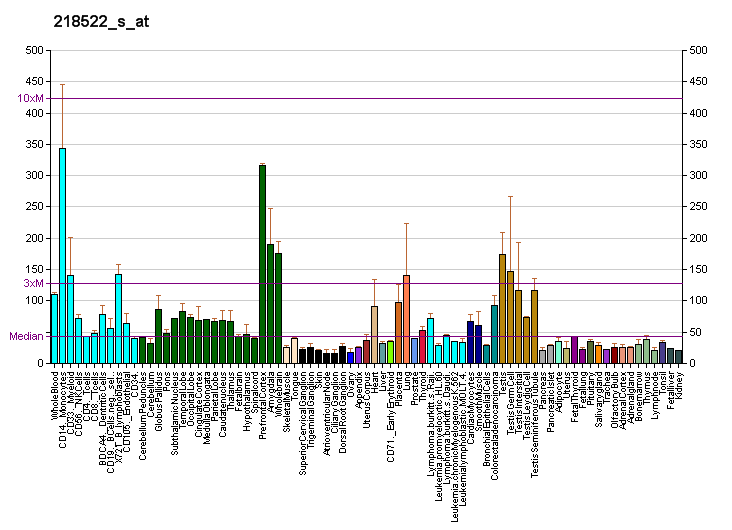
RNA expression pattern
| Bgee | Human / Mouse (ortholog); Top expressed in: right testis; left testis; prefrontal cortex; right frontal lobe; Brodmann area 9; anterior cingulate cortex; stromal cell of endometrium; muscle of thigh; putamen; gonad / Top expressed in: yolk sac; Rostral migratory stream; neural layer of retina; superior frontal gyrus; internal carotid artery; ankle joint; dentate gyrus of hippocampal formation granule cell; primary visual cortex; perirhinal cortex; entorhinal cortex; More reference expression data |
| BioGPS | More reference expression data |
Gene ontology
| Molecular function | DNA binding; deoxyribonuclease activity; microtubule binding; tubulin binding; actin filament binding; protein binding; beta-tubulin binding; identical protein binding; actin binding |
| Cellular component | cytosol; cell projection; microtubule cytoskeleton; spindle; synapse; cell junction; soma; dendrite; nucleolus; perinuclear region of cytoplasm; microtubule; cytoskeleton; nucleus; cytoplasm; microtubule associated complex |
| Biological process | neuron projection morphogenesis; nervous system development; autophagy; brain development; microtubule bundle formation; mitochondrion transport along microtubule; microtubule cytoskeleton organization; apoptotic process; DNA metabolic process; axonogenesis; dendrite development; regulation of microtubule depolymerization |
Sources:Amigo / QuickGO
Orthologs
| Species | Human | Mouse |
| Entrez | 55201 | 270058 |
| Ensembl | ENSG00000130479 | ENSMUSG00000019261 |
| UniProt | Q66K74 | Q8C052 |
| RefSeq (mRNA) | NM_001308363; NM_018174 | NM_173013 |
| RefSeq (protein) | NP_001295292; NP_060644 | NP_766601 |
| Location (UCSC) | Chr 19: 17.72 – 17.73 Mb | Chr 8: 71.36 – 71.37 Mb |
| PubMed search |
- Wikidata
| View/Edit Human | View/Edit Mouse |

Microtubule-associated protein 1S is a protein that in humans is encoded by the MAP1S gene.

== Interactions ==
MAP1S has been shown to interact with RASSF1.
