= Microtubule-associated protein =

Proteins interacting with microtubules

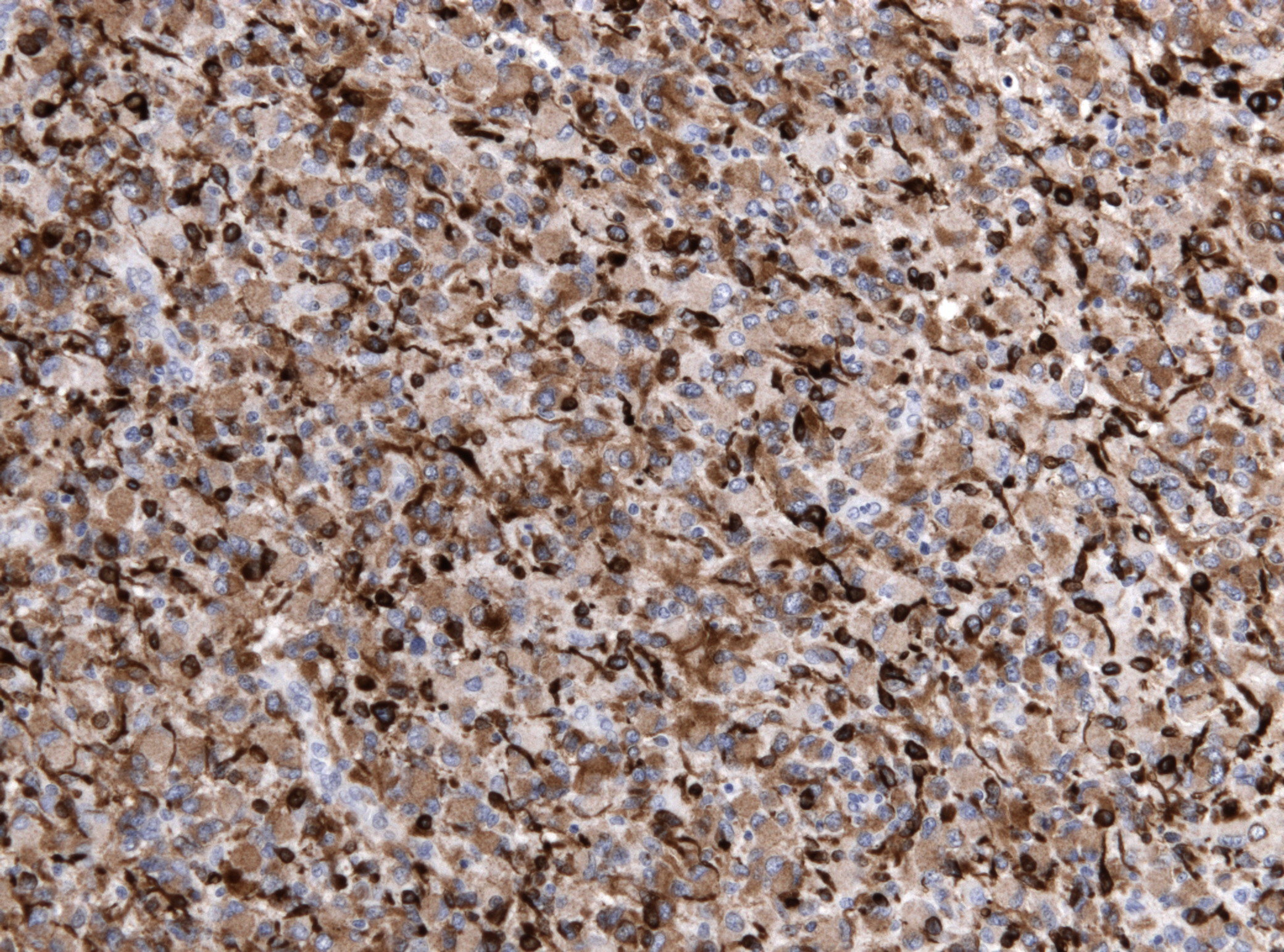
HIstopathology specimen of a glioblastoma, MAP2 immunostain.

In cell biology, microtubule-associated proteins (MAPs) are proteins that interact with the microtubules of the cellular cytoskeleton. MAPs are integral to the stability of the cell and its internal structures and the transport of components within the cell.

== Function ==
MAPs bind to the tubulin subunits that make up microtubules to regulate their stability. A large variety of MAPs have been identified in many different cell types, and they have been found to carry out a wide range of functions. These include both stabilizing and destabilizing microtubules, guiding microtubules towards specific cellular locations, cross-linking microtubules and mediating the interactions of microtubules with other proteins in the cell.

Within the cell, MAPs bind directly to the tubulin dimers of microtubules. This binding can occur with either polymerized or depolymerized tubulin, and in most cases leads to the stabilization of microtubule structure, further encouraging polymerization. Usually, it is the C-terminal domain of the MAP that interacts with tubulin, while the N-terminal domain can bind with cellular vesicles, intermediate filaments or other microtubules. MAP-microtubule binding is regulated through MAP phosphorylation. This is accomplished through the function of the microtubule-affinity-regulating-kinase (MARK) protein. Phosphorylation of the MAP by the MARK causes the MAP to detach from any bound microtubules. This detachment is usually associated with a destabilization of the microtubule causing it to fall apart. In this way the stabilization of microtubules by MAPs is regulated within the cell through phosphorylation.

== Types ==
MAPs have been divided into several different categories and sub-categories. There are "structural" MAPs which bind along the microtubules and "+TIP" MAPs which bind to the growing end of the microtubules. Structural MAPs have been divided into MAP1, MAP2, MAP4, and Tau families. +TIP MAPs are motor proteins such as kinesin, dyneins, and other MAPs.

=== MAP1 (Type I MAPs) ===
MAP1a (MAP1A) and MAP1b (MAP1B) are the two major members of the MAP1 family. These two proteins are high molecular weight. They bind to microtubules through charge interactions, a different mechanism to many other MAPs. While the C termini of these MAPs bind the microtubules, the N termini bind other parts of the cytoskeleton or the plasma membrane to control spacing of the microtubule within the cell. Members of the MAP1 family are found in the axons and dendrites of nerve cells.

Another member of this family is MAP1S, which has a low molecular-weight. MAP1S has been found to regulate cell division and cell death

=== MAP2 (Type 2) ===
The MAP2 family is involved in the development of neurons, mostly present during early stages of axon formation then disappear later. However they exist in mature dendrites as well. Different forms of MAP2s are formed by different post-translational modifications of the mRNA.

=== MAP4 ===
MAP4 was previously not thought to exist in neuronal tissue however the MAP-SP has been found in certain mammalian brain tissue. MAP4 is not confined to just nerve cells, but rather can be found in nearly all types of cells.

=== Tau Protein (Type 2) ===
Mainly associated with abnormalities that result in neurodegenerative diseases. Tau proteins stabilize microtubules, and thus shift the reaction kinetics in favor of addition of new subunits, accelerating microtubule growth. Tau has the additional function of facilitating bundling of microtubules within the nerve cell. The function of tau has been linked to the neurological condition Alzheimer's disease. In the nervous tissue of Alzheimer's patients, tau forms abnormal aggregates. This aggregated tau is often severely modified, most commonly through hyperphosphorylation. As described above, phosphorylation of MAPs causes them to detach from microtubules. Thus, the hyperphosphorylation of tau leads to massive detachment, which in turn greatly reduces the stability of microtubules in nerve cells.[9] This increase in microtubule instability may be one of the main causes of the symptoms of Alzheimer's disease.

=== Type II MAPs (MAP2 and Tau) ===
Type II MAPs are found exclusively in nerve cells in mammals. These are the most well studied MAPs—MAP2 and tau (MAPT)—which participate in determining the structure of different parts of nerve cells, with MAP2 being found mostly in dendrites and tau in the axon. These proteins have a conserved C-terminal microtubule-binding domain and variable N-terminal domains projecting outwards, probably interacting with other proteins. MAP2 and tau stabilize microtubules, and thus shift the reaction kinetics in favor of addition of new subunits, accelerating microtubule growth. Both MAP2 and tau have been shown to stabilize microtubules by binding to the outer surface of the microtubule protofilaments. A single study has suggested that MAP2 and tau bind on the inner microtubule surface on the same site in tubulin monomers as the drug Taxol, which is used in treating cancer, but this study has not been confirmed. MAP2 binds in a cooperative manner, with many MAP2 proteins binding a single microtubule to promote stabilization. Tau has the additional function of facilitating bundling of microtubules within the nerve cell.

The function of tau has been linked to the neurological condition Alzheimer's disease. In the nervous tissue of Alzheimer's patients, tau forms abnormal aggregates. This aggregated tau is often severely modified, most commonly through hyperphosphorylation. As described above, phosphorylation of MAPs causes them to detach from microtubules. Thus, the hyperphosphorylation of tau leads to massive detachment, which in turn greatly reduces the stability of microtubules in nerve cells. This increase in microtubule instability may be one of the main causes of the symptoms of Alzheimer's disease.

In contrast to the MAPs described above, MAP4 (MAP4) is not confined to just nerve cells, but rather can be found in nearly all types of cells. Like MAP2 and tau, MAP4 is responsible for stabilization of microtubules. MAP4 has also been linked to the process of cell division.

=== Meiosis ===
Meiosis is a specialized form of cell division that generates haploid germ cells from diploid progenitor cells. During the early meiosis stage of pachynema in spermatocytes a male specific MAPS protein is expressed that is essential for pachynema progression. Male mice lacking MAPS function experience pachytene arrest and spermatocyte death leading to infertility. MAPS mutant spermatocytes arrested at early pachytene show defects in DNA double-strand break repair.

=== Other MAPs and Naming Issues ===
Besides the classic MAP groups, novel MAPs have been identified that bind the length of the microtubules. These include STOP (also known as MAP6), and ensconsin (also known as MAP7).

In addition, plus end tracking proteins, which bind to the very tip of growing microtubules, have also been identified. These include EB1, EB2, EB3, p150Glued, Dynamitin, Lis1, CLIP170, CLIP115, CLASP1, and CLASP2.

Another MAP whose function has been investigated during cell division is known as XMAP215 (the "X" stands for Xenopus). XMAP215 has generally been linked to microtubule stabilization. During mitosis the dynamic instability of microtubules has been observed to rise approximately tenfold. This is partly due to phosphorylation of XMAP215, which makes catastrophes (rapid depolymerization of microtubules) more likely. In this way the phosphorylation of MAPs plays a role in mitosis.

There are many other proteins which affect microtubule behavior, such as catastrophin, which destabilizes microtubules, katanin, which severs them, and a number of motor proteins that transport vesicles along them. Certain motor proteins were originally designated as MAPs before it was found that they utilized ATP hydrolysis to transport cargo. In general, all these proteins are not considered "MAPs" because they do not bind directly to tubulin monomers, a defining characteristic of MAPs. MAPs bind directly to microtubules to stabilize or destabilize them and link them to various cellular components including other microtubules.

== See also ==
- Alzheimer's disease
- Cytoskeleton
- Microtubule
